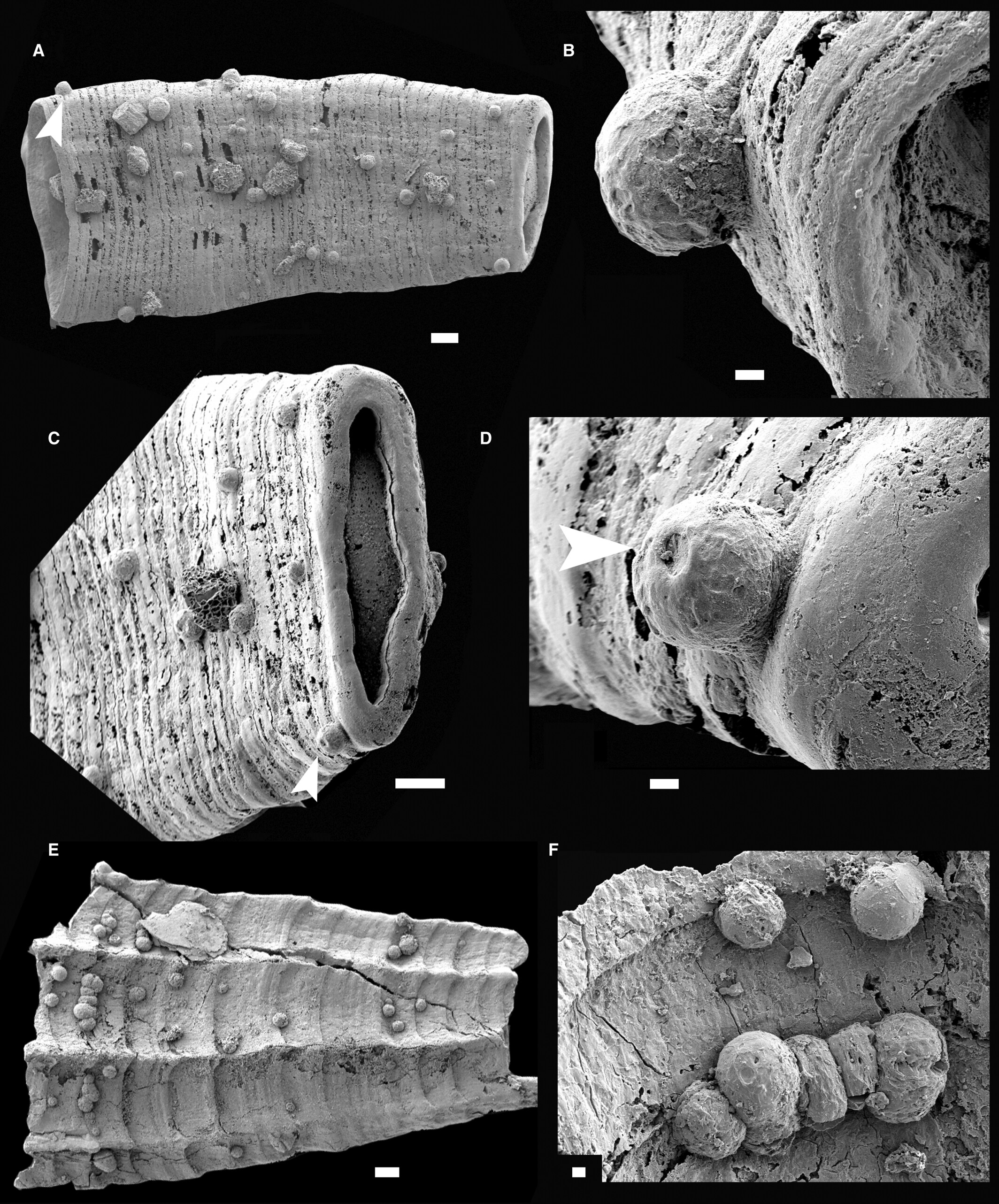
- Examples of Avannacystis polaris attached to the genus Tesella

Scientific classification
- (unranked): incertae sedis
- Genus: †Avannacystis; Willman & Peel, 2026
- Species: †A. polaris

Binomial name
- †Avannacystis polaris Willman & Peel, 2026

= Avannacystis =

Avannacystis Temporal range: middle Cambrian

Extinct genus of vesicular microfossils

Avannacystis is an extinct colonising microorganism from the middle Cambrian of Greenland, found on or within the shells of Tesella. It is a monotypic genus, containing only Avannacystis polaris, and the true affinities remain unknown.

== Discovery and naming ==
The holotype material for Avannacystis was found at Locality 3 of the Henson Gletscher Formation, in North Greenland in August 2006, and was formally described and named in 2026.

The generic name Avannacystis derives from the Greenlandic name for Northern Greenland, "Avanna"; and the Greek word kystis, to mean "vesicle", in reference to the locality and overall shape of the organisms. The specific name polaris directly derives from the Latin word of the same spelling, polaris, in reference to the location of the organisms.

== Description ==
Avannacystis polaris is spherical vesicles, ranging between 20–120 μm (0.00079–0.00472 in) in diameter, and always found living on or within the shells of the tommotiid genus Tesella. The vesicle commonly bear a single dimple on the surface, inferred to originally be a circular invagination. They are also commonly found as single individuals, although can also be found in clusters ranging between 2–10 vesicles of varying sizes, and deform to allow closer packing together.

== Affinities ==
Whilst the true affinity of Avannacystis is unknown, some possibilities were put forward in the description paper, which are as follows:

=== Fungal ===
When a fungal affinity is considered, Avannacystis' habitat, morphology and invagination resembles what is seen in modern chytrids. Chytrids have a well known life-cycle, which includes flagellated zoospores and sporangia, which commonly form narrow discharge tubes from the sporangia, expelling the zoospores. The invagination structures found on Avannacystis may be exit pores that performed a similar function. Whilst this allows for a tentative interpretation of Avannacystis as a chtyrid, is it noted that other interpretations may be more likely, and that certain features may be due to taphonomic processes.

=== Algal ===
When an algal affinity is considered, Avannacystis' simple morphology resembles certain types of unicellular algae, such as chlorophytes, which commonly form colonies and attach to various substrates. Although it is noted that internals of Avannacystis limits a proper placement as an algae, alongside the fact that several specimens have been found within the shells of Tesella, which would have notably blocked any light from being able to reach said specimens.

=== Sulphur bacteria ===
When an sulphur bacterial affinity is considered, Avannacystis' contains a notably high amount of sulphur with it, hinting at the probability of a affinity to sulphur-oxidizing bacteria, similar to Thiomargarita or Beggiatoa. The two given examples are known to have large, spherical cells, and of course thrive in sulphide-rich environments. Although, the known environment of Avannacystis does not suggest a sulphide-rich environment, but it is noted diagenetic alteration may have occurred, obscuring the original conditions of the locality. Despite this, a prior study in 2011 on Thiomargarita-like bacteria noted that a part of its life-cycle including attaching to substrates, most commonly to gastropod shells, with Thiomargarita itself being found also attaching to shells in 2012, meaning that whilst rare, sulphur-oxidizing bacteria do attach to other organisms at some point in their life.
