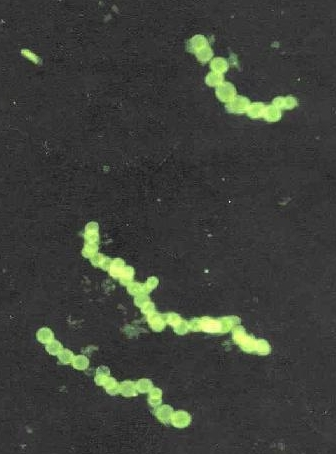
- Stained micrograph of Thiomargarita namibiensis

Scientific classification
- Domain: Bacteria
- Kingdom: Pseudomonadati
- Phylum: Pseudomonadota
- Class: Gammaproteobacteria
- Order: Thiotrichales
- Family: Thiotrichaceae
- Genus: Thiomargarita
- Species: T. namibiensis

Binomial name
- Thiomargarita namibiensis Schulz et al., 1999

= Thiomargarita namibiensis =

Species of bacterium

Thiomargarita namibiensis is a gram-negative, facultative anaerobic, coccoid bacterium found in South Africa's ocean sediments of the continental shelf of Namibia. The genus name Thiomargarita means "sulfur pearl." This refers to the cells' appearance as they contain microscopic elemental sulfur granules just below the cell wall that refract light creating a pearly iridescent luster. The cells are each covered in a mucus sheath aligned in a chain, resembling loose strings of pearls. The species name namibiensis means "of Namibia".

It is the second largest bacterium ever discovered, at 0.1–0.3 mm (100–300 μm) in diameter on average, but can attain up to 0.75 mm (750 μm), making it large enough to be visible to the naked eye. Thiomargarita namibiensis is nonpathogenic.

Thiomargarita namibiensis is categorized as a mesophile because it prefers moderate temperatures between 20 and 45 degrees Celsius. The organism shows neutrophilic characteristics by favoring environments with neutral pH levels like 6.5-7.5.

== Discovery ==
The species Thiomargarita namibiensis was collected in 1997 and discovered in 1999 by Heide N. Schulz and her colleagues from the Max Planck Institute for Marine Microbiology. It was discovered in coastal sediments on the Namibian coast of West Africa. Schulz and her colleagues were off the coast of Namibia in search of Beggiatoa and Thioploca, two microbes which had previously been discovered off the South American Pacific coast in 1842 and 1906, respectively. They chose to conduct further research off the Namibian coast due to the similar hydrography of these coasts; both have strong and deep ocean currents which can stir-up various nutrients for the deep sea organisms to feast. Schulz's team found small quantities of Beggiatoa and Thioploca in sediment samples, but large quantities of the previously undiscovered Thiomargarita namibiensis. Researchers suggested the species be named Thiomargarita namibiensis, which means "sulfur pearl of Namibia", which was fitting as the bacteria appeared a blue-green, white color, as well as spheres strung together. The previously largest known bacterium was Epulopiscium fishelsoni, at 0.5 mm long. The current largest known bacterium is Thiomargarita magnifica, described in 2022, at an average length of 10 mm.

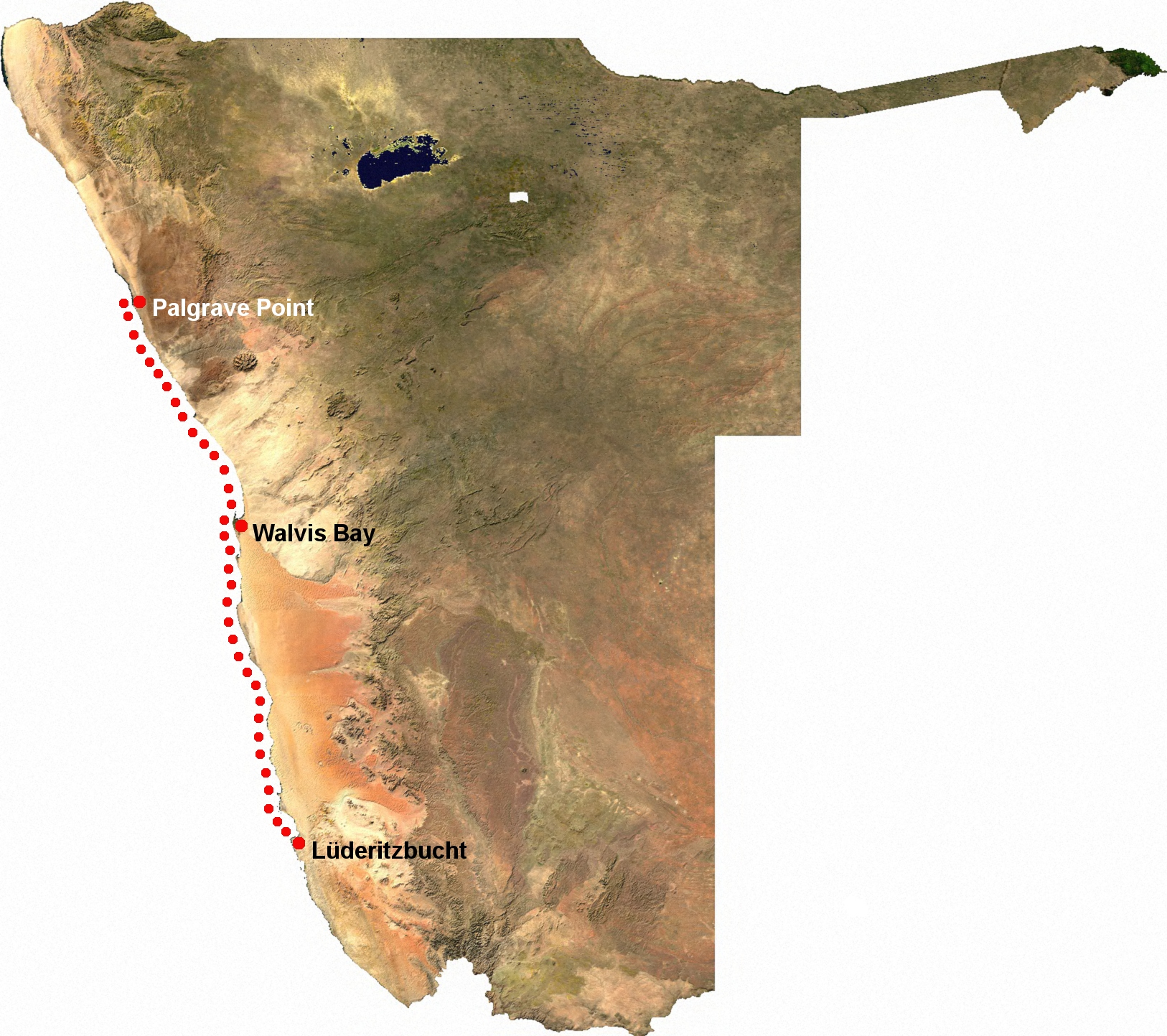
Distribution of Thiomargarita namibiensis in Namibia

In 2002 a strain exhibiting 99% identity with Thiomargarita namibiensis was found in sediment cores taken from the Gulf of Mexico during a research expedition. This similar strain either occurs in single cells or clusters of 2, 4, and 8 cells, as opposed to the Namibian strain which occurs in single chains of cells separated by a thin mucus sheath.

== Occurrence ==
Thiomargarita namibiensis was found in the continental shelf off the coast of Namibia, an area with high plankton productivity and low oxygen concentrations between 0-3 μM, and nitrate concentrations of 5-28 μM. Thiomargarita namibiensis is most prevalent in the Walvis Bay area at 300 feet deep, but they are distributed along the coast of Namibia from Palgrave Point to Lüderitzbucht. T. namibiensis is not found across the entire shelf, it is only found within a specific sediment type, diatomaceous mud, which is composed mainly of dead diatoms. Diatomaceous mud has high sulfate reduction rates and high levels of organic material. The most bacteria were obtained from the upper 3 cm of sediment in the sample, with concentrations decreasing exponentially past this point. Here, Thiomargarita namibiensis is easily suspended in moving ocean currents due to the sheath around the cells, which makes it easy for the bacteria to passively float. In this section of sediment, there were sulfide concentrations of 100-800 μM.

Although previously undiscovered, T. namibiensis is not uncommon in its environment. It is by far the most common benthos bacterium of the Namibian shelf, comprising almost 0.8% of the sediment volume. About 8% of the shelf with diatomaceous mud has free gases are present in shallow depths. When the gas is released from the sediment, sulfide is released into the water column. T. namibiensis is more prevalent in areas with free gas, suggesting that the presence of suspended sulfide is beneficial to the bacteria. T. namibiensis will oxidize the hydrogen sulfide (H_{2}S) from the sediment into sulfur and sulfide, thus allowing less sulfide into the water column and detoxifying the water. However, the supply of sulfide produced by the underlying sediment can be too much for the cell to oxidize all of it, and sulfide still enters the water column. The Namibian coastal environmental experiences strong upwelling, resulting in low oxygen levels with large amounts of plankton. The lower waters lack oxygen due to the multitude of microorganisms releasing carbon dioxide while they perform heterotrophic respiration to generate energy.

Since the Thiomargarita namibiensis are immobile, they are unable to seek a more ideal environment when sulfide and nitrate levels are low in this environment. They simply remain in position and wait for levels to increase once again so that they can undergo respiration and other processes. This is possible because T. namibiensis have the ability to store large supplies of sulfur and nitrate. The organism also has a direct impact on its environment. Apatite, a mineral high in phosphorite, is correlated with the abundance of T. namibiensis through phosphogenesis. Internal polyphosphate and nitrate are used as external electron acceptors in the presence of acetate, releasing enough phosphate to cause precipitation. While the amount directly created by T. namibiensis cannot be calculated, it is a significant contribution to the large amounts of hydroxyapatite in solid-phase shelf sediment. The Mexican strain was primarily found in the top centimeter of sediment sampled from cold seeps in the Gulf of Mexico. The top 3 cm of sediment from the Gulf of Mexico locations contained sulfide concentrations of 200-1900 μM.

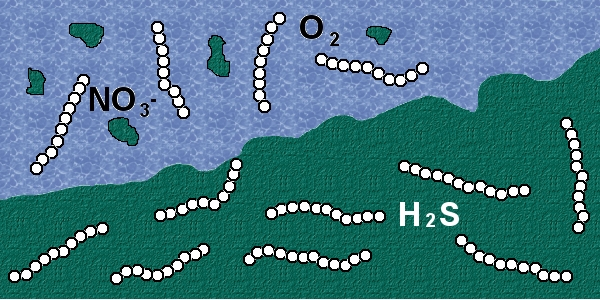
Thiomargarita namibiensis, collecting nitrate and oxygen in water above the bottom in case of being resuspended and collecting sulfide in the sediments

== Physiology ==
=== Morphology ===
Although Thiomargarita are closely related to Thioploca and Beggiatoa in function, their structures are different. Thioploca and Beggiatoa cells are much smaller and grow tightly stacked on each other in long filaments. Their shape is necessary for them to shuttle down into the ocean sediments to find more sulfide and nitrate. In contrast, Thiomargarita grow in rows of separate single spherical cells, so they lack the range of motility that Thioploca and Beggiota have. Thiomargarita can also grow in barrel-like shapes. The cocci shaped Thiomargarita can join to create chains of 4-20 cells, while the bacillus shaped Thiomargarita can form chains of more than 50 cells. These chains are not linked together by filaments, but connected by a mucus sheath. Each cell appears reflective and white as a result of their sulfur content.

Scientists did not previously believe these large bacteria could exist because bacteria rely on chemiosmosis and cellular transport processes across their membranes to make ATP. As the cell size increases, they make proportionately less ATP, thus energy production limits their size. Thiomargarita are an exception to this size constraint, as their cytoplasm forms along the periphery of the cell, while the nitrate-storing vacuoles occupy the center of the cell. These vacuoles make up most of the cell. As these vacuoles swell, the cell grows considerably which is the primary factor contributing to the record sizes of Thiomargarita cells. T. namibiensis holds the record for the world's second largest bacterium, with a volume three million times more than that of average bacteria.

=== Motility ===
With their lack of movement, Thiomargarita have adapted by evolving the very large nitrate-storing bubbles vacuoles, allowing them to survive long periods of nitrate and sulfide starvation. Studies have shown that although there are no present motility features, the individual spherical cells can move slightly in a "slow jerky rolling motion," but this does not give them the range of motion traditional motility features would. Other large sulfur bacteria found in the same sediment samples as T. namibiensis with different structures, such as Thioploca and Beggiota, have gliding motility. However, Thiomargarita cells do not have gliding motility due to their shape. The vacuoles give T. namibiensis cells the ability to stay immobile, waiting for nitrate-rich waters to sweep over them once again. These vacuoles are what account for the size that scientists had previously thought impossible, and account for roughly 98% of the cell volume. Because of the vast size of the liquid central vacuole, the cytoplasm separating the vacuole and the cell membrane is a very thin layer reported to be around 0.5-2 micrometers thick. This cytoplasm, however, is non-homogenous. The cytoplasm contains small bubbles of sulfur, polyphosphate, and glycogen. These bubbles give the cytoplasm a "sponge-like" resemblance.

As areas of nitrate and hydrogen sulfide do not mix together and T. namibiensis cells are immobile, the storage vacuoles in the cell provide a solution to this problem. Because of these storage vacuoles, cells are able to stay viable without growing (or dividing), with low relative amounts of cellular protein, and large amounts of nitrogen in the vacuoles. The storage vacuoles provide a novel solution which allows cells to wait for changing conditions while staying alive. These vacuoles are packed with sulfur granules that can be used for energy and contribute to their chemolithotrophic metabolism. The vacuoles of Thiomargarita namibiensis contribute to their gigantism, allowing them to store nutrients for asexual reproduction of their complex genome.

== Size Adaption ==
Bacteria, on average, are significantly smaller in size than Thiomargarita namibiensis. The smaller the size of a cell, the quicker it can reproduce and diffuse nutrients, and the higher the likelihood the biomolecule will almost immediately reach its site of activity. Despite the large size of T. namibiensis, its primary mechanism for nutrient uptake is still through normal diffusion. T. namibiensis can perform normal diffusion due to the reduced amount of cytoplasm as a result of its large vacuoles. These large central vacuoles, which act as reserves, are the source of the large size of T. namibiensis. Because of its reserves, Thiomargarita namibiensis can survive in its environment where nutrients are infrequently available. The reserves allow T. namibiensis to store the required nutrients to sustain the cell for extended periods of nutrient deficiency in its environment. Another adaptation advanced by the large size of T. namibiensis is its ability to survive without growing. Collected and stored sediment samples were found to have surviving T. namibiensis cells after over two years. The cells had no access to any added sulfide or nitrate during this time. In the surviving cells, there was a notable size decrease. To survive without growing the cells depended on the nutrient stores of the central vacuoles. The consistent reliance on the nutrient stores without replenishment caused the cells to lose size; however, the cells were able to continue surviving. The displayed durability of these cells reveals the impressive functionality of the large vacuoles in T. namibiensis cells. The storage capacity of these vacuoles can allow T. namibiensis cells to survive for prolonged lengths of time without access to nutrients.

== Metabolism ==
Thiomargarita namibiensis is chemolithotrophic and is capable of using nitrate as the terminal electron acceptor in the electron transport chain. Chemo refers to the way the microbe obtains its energy, which is done by using oxidation-reduction reactions of compounds. Litho defines an organism's way of getting energy, which is done by using inorganic molecules as a source of electrons. This would be useful in an environment deficient in nutrients, such as soil or in an area with lots of sulfur. The final part of this metabolism characterization is how the bacterium obtains carbon, which in this case is done so in an autotrophic way. This means the organism uses carbon dioxide (CO_{2}) from its environment as a carbon source and then synthesizes organic compounds from it. Thiomargarita namibiensis uses what is known as the reverse or reductive TCA cycle to convert CO_{2} into usable energy. This adaptation shows how the bacterium has evolved to survive in specific environments where usual metabolic pathways might not work well enough. There is still much unknown about the metabolism and phylogeny of the sulfur bacteria.

The bacterium is facultatively anaerobic rather than obligately anaerobic, and thus capable of respiring with oxygen if it is plentiful and without oxygen when it is minimal or absent. While not much is known about the exact metabolism the bacterium performs, it is known to exist in environments of high sulfur and little to no oxygen present. This bacterium often uses anaerobic respiration due to its environment not supplying ample oxygen.

Sulfur oxidation is the main energy source for Thiomargarita namibiensis. Sulfide is the electron donor for this bacterium. T. namibiensis will oxidize hydrogen sulfide (H_{2}S) into elemental sulfur (S). This is deposited as granules in its periplasm. Nitrate is the electron acceptor in this oxidation-reduction reaction. Large amounts of nitrogen must be stored as a terminal electron acceptor in the electron transport chain. The large vacuole mainly stores nitrate for sulfur oxidation. Because of this and the organism's size, large amounts of sulfur are required which are stored as cyclooctasulfur. Both sulfide and nitrate are essential to the function of energy production in this bacterium.

Studies show that in some cases T. namibiensis can use oxygen as the electron acceptor in the oxidation of sulfur. However, this bacterium is predominantly located in environments of very minimal to no oxygen availability; therefore, nitrate will be the standard electron acceptor for the oxidation-reduction reaction. However, when oxygen is available in its environment Thiomargarita namibiensis is able to utilize it as the electron acceptor in place of nitrate.

While sulfide is available in the surrounding sediment, produced by other bacteria from dead microalgae that sank down to the sea bottom, the nitrate comes from the above seawater. Since the bacterium is sessile, and the concentration of available nitrate fluctuates considerably over time, it stores nitrate at high concentration (up to 0.8 molar) in a large vacuole, which is responsible for about 80% of its size. When nitrate concentrations in the environment are low, T. namibiensis uses the contents of its vacuole for respiration. T. namibiensis cells possess elevated nitrate concentrations giving them the capacity to absorb oxygen both when nitrate is present and when it is not. Thus, the presence of a central vacuole in its cells enables a prolonged survival in sulfidic sediments and nitrate starvation. This allows the bacteria cells to safely wait for shifts in environmental conditions. The non-motility of Thiomargarita cells is compensated by its large cellular size. This immobility suggests that they rely on shifting chemical conditions.

Cyclooctasulfur is stored in the globules of sulfur in the vacuoles of T. namibiensis, aiding in their metabolism. After the oxidation of sulfide, T. namibiensis stores sulfur as cyclooctasulfur, the most thermodynamically stable form of sulfur at standard temperature and pressure. With these sulfur globules in the cell, the organism uses it as storage of elemental sulfur in usually anoxic conditions to reduce the toxicity of various sulfur compounds (can also survive in atmospheric oxygen conditions as it is not toxic). The sulfur globules are stored in the thin outer layer of the cytoplasm, presumably after their use as a source of electrons in the electron transport chain through oxidation of sulfide. The ability to oxidize hydrogen sulfide provides nutrients to other organisms living near it.

== Reproduction ==
Thiomargarita namibiensis has an ability to survive in nutrient-poor environments due to stored nitrate and sulfur, which enables the cells to stay alive without reproducing. When the cells are unable to reproduce, most cells shorten to cocci or diplococcus arrangement. T. namibiensis reproduces mainly through binary fission. Reproduction of T. namibiensis occurs on a single plane; the cocci (a spherical bacterial cell) divide into a diplococcus or streptococcus arrangement. A diplococcus is a pair of cocci cells that can form chains, and streptococcus is a grape-like cluster of cells. In the case of T. namibiensis, a diplococci structure is observed. Despite this, its cells remain connected, forming chains within a common mucus matrix. In addition to helping with essential functions including food exchange and cell-to-cell communication, this matrix can give the bacteria protection and structural support. During the process of binary fission, a single bacterial cell divides into two identical daughter cells, representing a comparatively basic form of asexual reproduction. The cells that make up the filamentous chain may then separate into smaller segments, and each of those segments may go on to produce a new filament. In a laboratory setting, the number of cells doubled over a period of 1 to 2 weeks when both nitrate and sulfide were available.

== Genome ==
Thiomargarita namibiensis has a distinct genetic architecture because of its remarkable cell size and environmental niche. The DNA of T. namibiensis is dispersed over nucleoid areas situated under the cell membrane, in contrast to normal bacteria, which have a concentrated nucleoid. This peripheral design provides efficient cellular activities by lowering the distance over which chemical signals and metabolites must travel despite the huge cell volume. A whole genome sequence of T. namibiensis is unavailable because it is difficult to culture and extract sufficient DNA. However, T. namibiensis is polyploid, which means many copies of the genome are distributed throughout the cytoplasm. This genetic redundancy helped its metabolic requirements and improved its capacity to repair damaged DNA by environmental stresses. T. namibiensis's genomic architecture is like that of other big bacteria, such as Epulopiscium fishelsoni. Both species have DNA distributed around the cell periphery to promote localized gene expression and effective cellular responses in big cells. This structure helps to overcome the constraints based on their size, allowing them to adapt quickly to environmental changes. The T. namibiensis genome is important because it is involved in biogeochemical cycles including sulfur and nitrogen cycling. T. namibiensis is found in sulfide-rich, oxygen-poor marine sediments because of its gene involved in sulfur oxidation and nitrate reduction. Single-cell genomic investigations revealed that it has identified genes that might provide adaptability to dynamic redox circumstances.

== Significance ==
T. namibiensis plays a vital role in the sulfur and nitrogen cycles. In their sulfur rich environment, oxygen is scarcely available and cannot be used as an electron acceptor. In turn, T. namibiensis uses nitrate as the electron acceptor, which they consume at the sediment surface and condense in a vacuole. From this, they can oxidize the toxic hydrogen sulfide that inhabits the sediment into sulfide. Therefore, T. nambiensis acts as a detoxifier that removes poisonous gas from the water. This keeps the environment affable for fish and other marine living beings as well as providing sulfide, which is a crucial nutrient for marine organisms. These bacteria also play an essential role in the phosphorus cycle of the sediment. T. namibiensis can release phosphate in anoxic sediments at high rates which contribute to the spontaneous precipitation of phosphorus-containing material. This plays an important role in the removal of phosphorus in the biosphere.

== See also ==
- Valonia ventricosa – a large, 5 centimetre-wide unicellular species of algae
- Thiomargarita magnifica – the current largest bacterium in the world, closely related to this organism
