= Thioploca araucae =

Scientific classification
- Domain: Bacteria
- Kingdom: Pseudomonadati
- Phylum: Pseudomonadota
- Class: Gammaproteobacteria
- Order: Thiotrichales
- Family: Thiotrichaceae
- Genus: Thioploca
- Species: T. araucae

Binomial name
- Thioploca araucae Maier and Gallardo 1984

Species of bacterium

Thioploca araucae is a marine bacterium in the family Thiotrichaceae.
