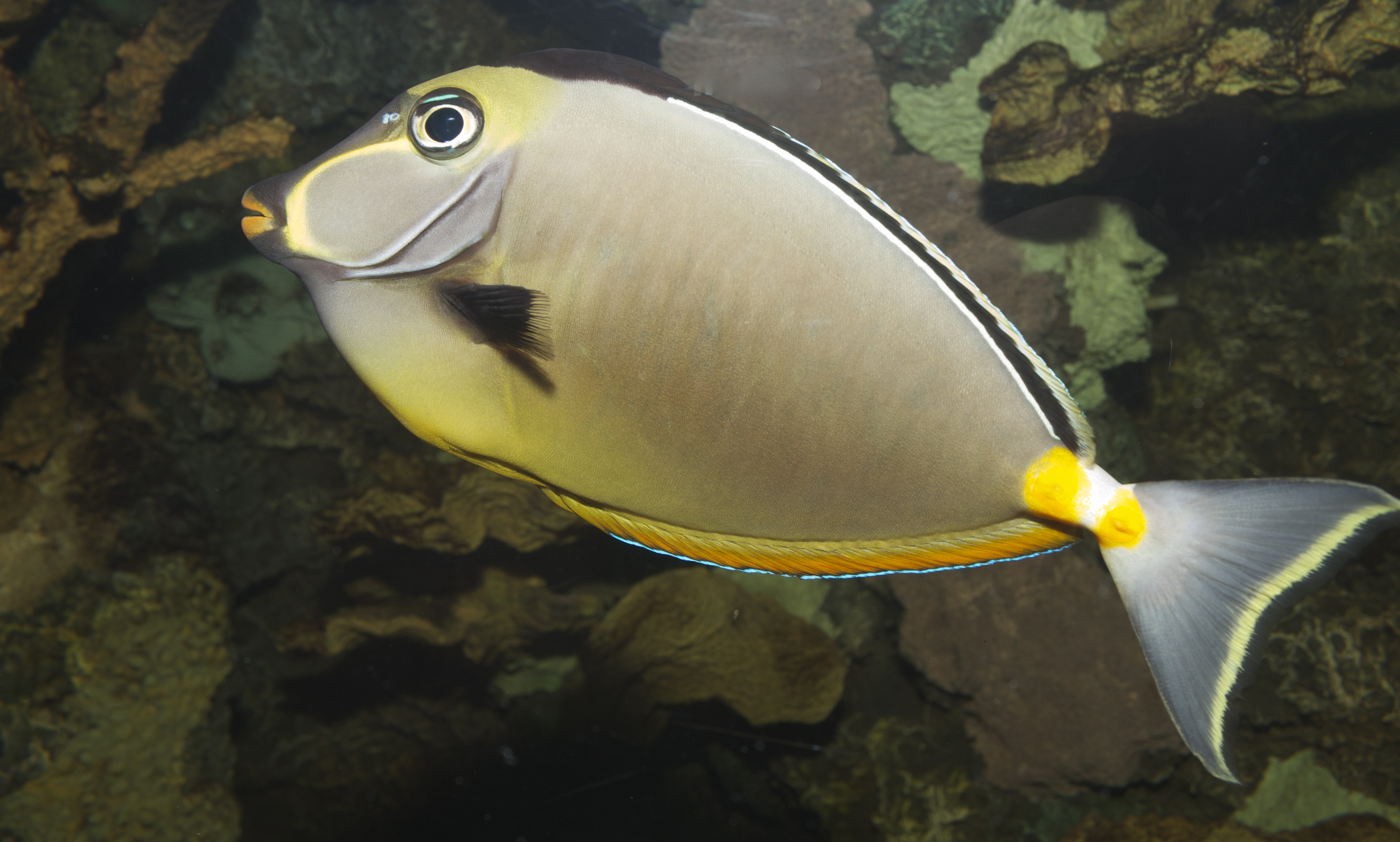

Conservation status
- Least Concern (IUCN 3.1)

Scientific classification
- Kingdom: Animalia
- Phylum: Chordata
- Class: Actinopterygii
- Order: Acanthuriformes
- Family: Acanthuridae
- Genus: Naso
- Species: N. lituratus

Binomial name
- Naso lituratus (J. R. Forster, 1801)

Synonyms
- List: Acanthurus lituratus Forster, 1801; Callicanthus lituratus (Forster, 1801); Aspisurus carolinarum Quoy & Gaimard, 1825; Prionurus eoume Lesson, 1831; Monoceros garretti Seale, 1901

= Naso lituratus =

Species of fish

Naso lituratus, also known as the clown unicornfish, orangespined unicornfish, orangespine unicornfish, black-finned unicornfish, Pacific orangespined unicornfish, blackfinned unicornfish or the stripefaced unicornfish, is a species of marine ray-finned fish belonging to the family Acanthuridae, which includes the surgeonfishes, unicornfishes and tangs. It is native to the eastern Indian Ocean and western Pacific Ocean, where it is found in coral reefs, often in pairs.

Naso lituratus is easily identified by two bright orange forward-hooked spines on the caudal peduncle (the tail base), as well as its orange lips and black face mask. The body is brownish grey with a yellow nape and a broad black band on the dorsal fin. It reaches about 45 cm (18 in) in length.

Unique to members of Acanthuridae, including Naso lituratus, are the Epulopiscium bacteria. These bacteria aid the fishes' digestion, helping them process the algae in their diet.

== Taxonomy ==
Naso lituratus was first formally described in 1801 as Acanthurus lituratus by the German naturalist Johann Reinhold Forster without stating a type locality, although this is considered to be Tahiti in the Society Islands of French Polynesia. This species is classified within the nominate subgenus of the genus Naso. The genus Naso is the only genus in the subfamily Nasinae in the family Acanthuridae.

== Description and morphology ==
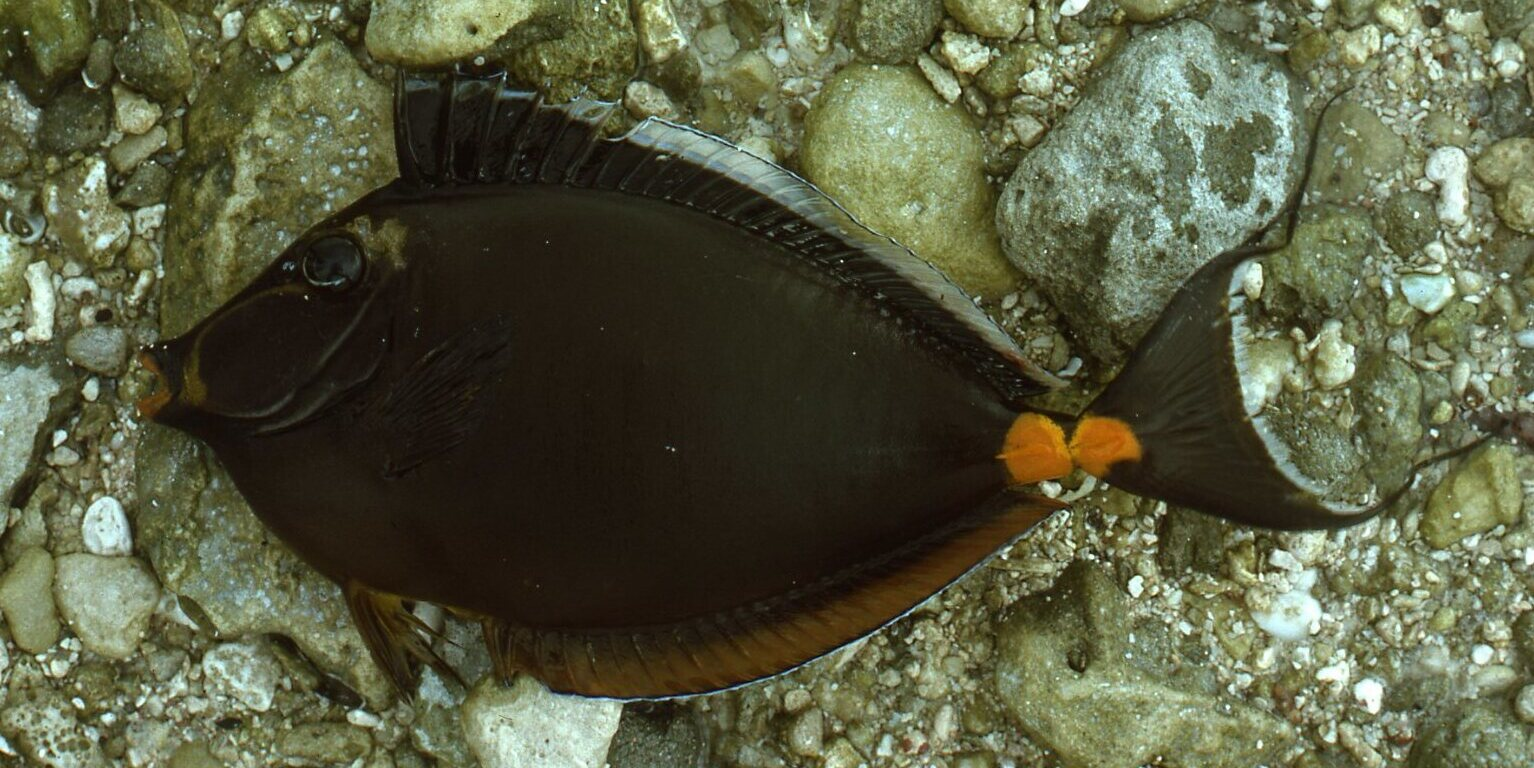
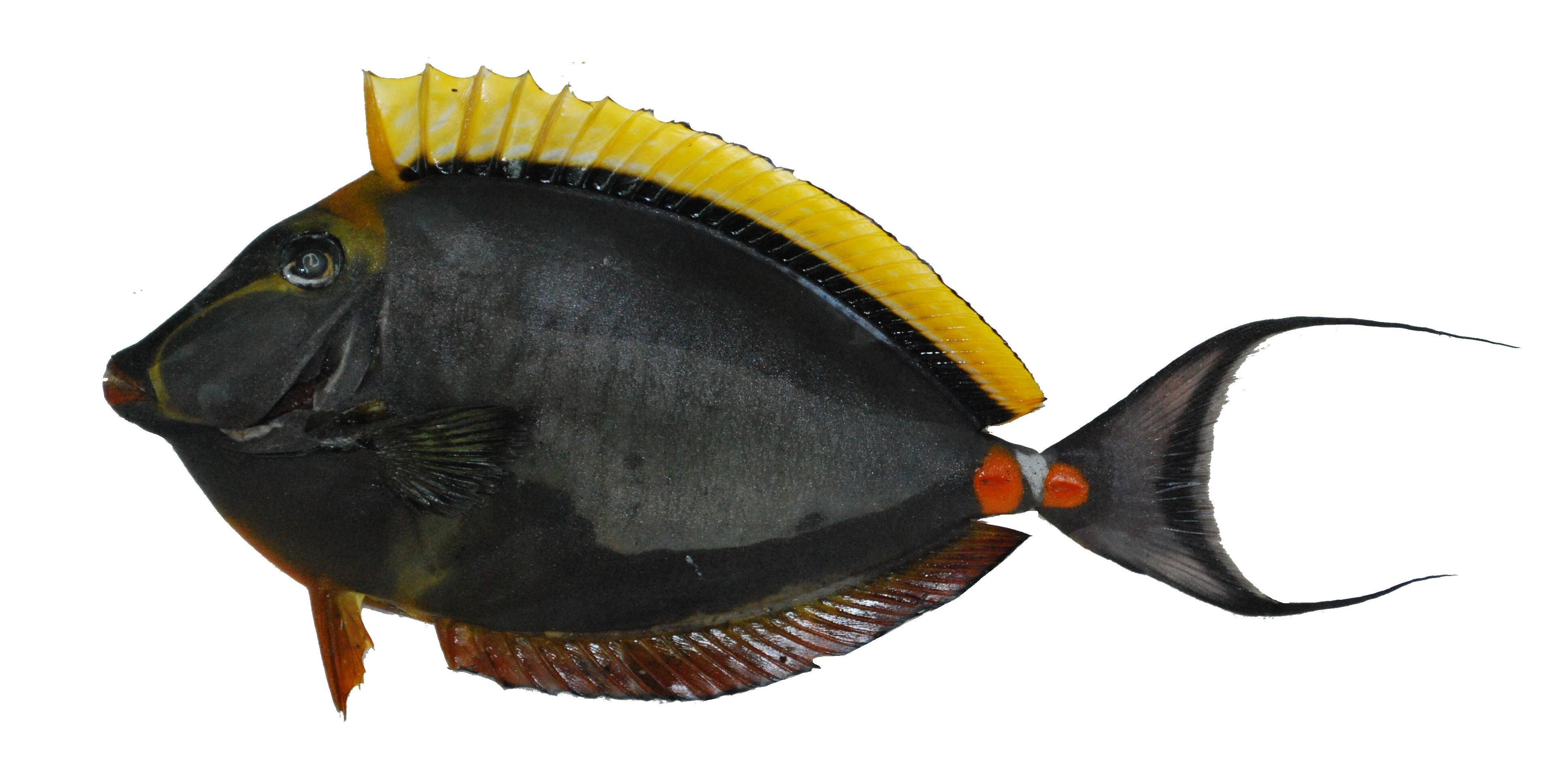
Comparison between N. lituratus (top) and the closely related N. elegans (bottom)

The features of Naso lituratus include orange lips, a caudal peduncle with a brash-hooked spine, and a black face mask. The descriptions of these features include one dorsal fin on top of the head which is encircled by a broad black band around 45 centimeters long. They barely grow in size. They have a long anal fin with II spines and 28–30 soft rays, and a continuous, unnotched dorsal fin with VI spines and 27–30 soft rays. It contains 8 to 9 gill rakers on the lower leg whereas the upper limb has 4. There are 6 spines in total, each with 26–29 soft rays. Adipose fins do not exist. There is one anal fin, two spines overall, and between 27 and 30 soft rays on it. The pectoral and pelvic fins are two of its paired fins. The pectoral fin contains 17–18 soft rays and 0 spines. The pelvic fin has a single spine and 3 soft rays. In adult males, the lobe's apex produces a lengthy filament. The caudal fin is lunate or crescent-shaped. Two sharp blades that point forward are on the caudal peduncle. In juveniles, the blades are not fully grown, as they have a stifling gray-brown tint with black, yellow, and white patterns. This species lacks the forehead "horns" or front protuberances that can be seen in certain other Acanthuridae species.

== Distribution and habitat ==
Naso lituratus lives in the East Indian and Pacific Oceans including in the waters around the Great Barrier Reef, as well as in Hawaii, with their habitat primarily in the coral reefs of those oceans. As in all species of the Acanthuridae, the sexes are separate and permanent; the sexes of N. lituratus also show distinct differences in size. In populations living near Guam, spawning occurs year-round. N. lituratus needs high oxygen levels, strong water currents, companions, and plenty of wild algae to feed upon. Their primary self-defense tactic is extending their strong tail spines to strike approaching predators.

== Gallery ==
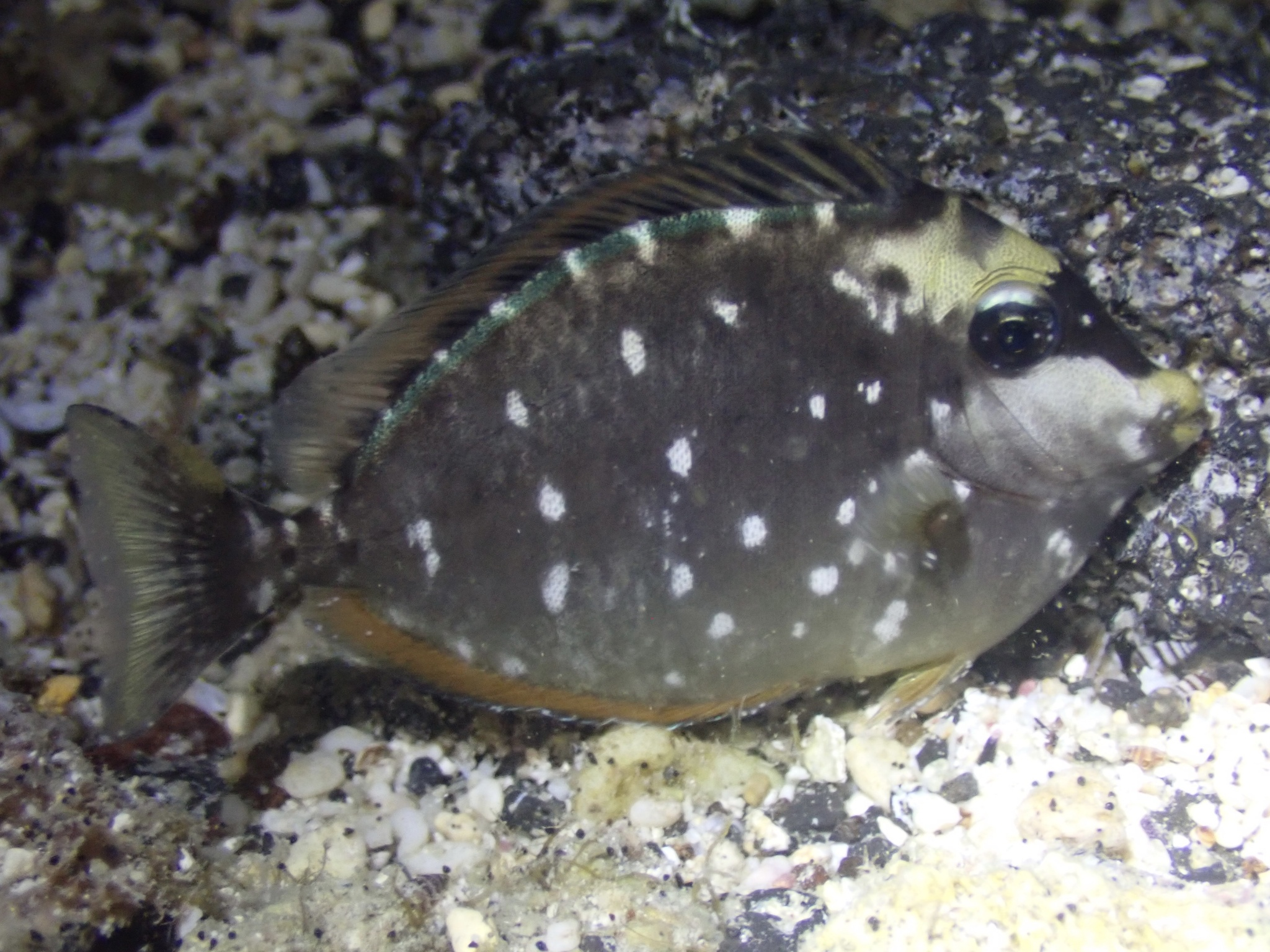
Juvenile nocturnal colouration, in Hawaii

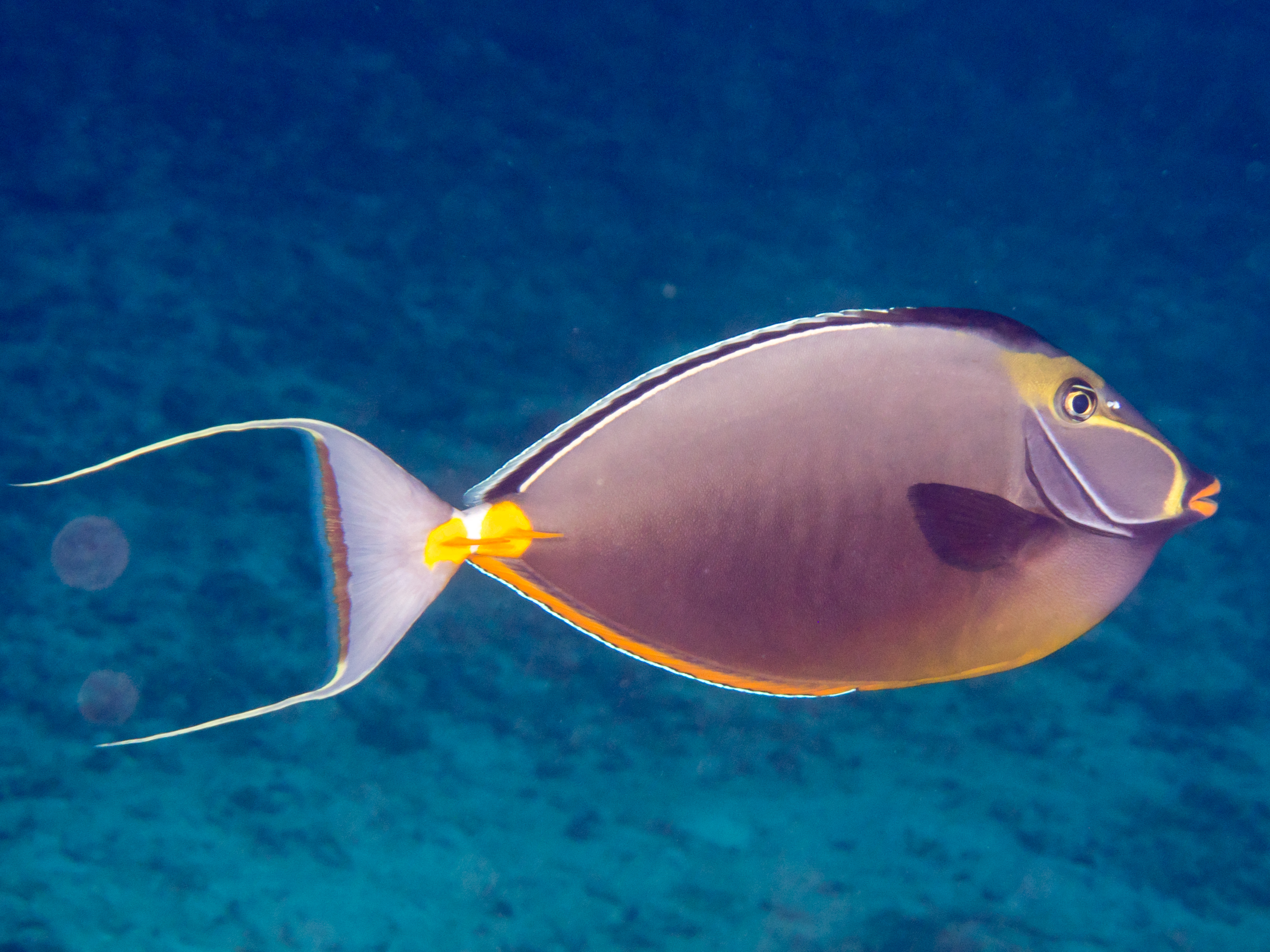
In Indonesia

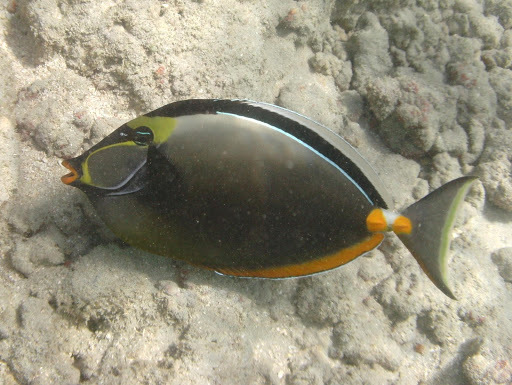
In Hawaii

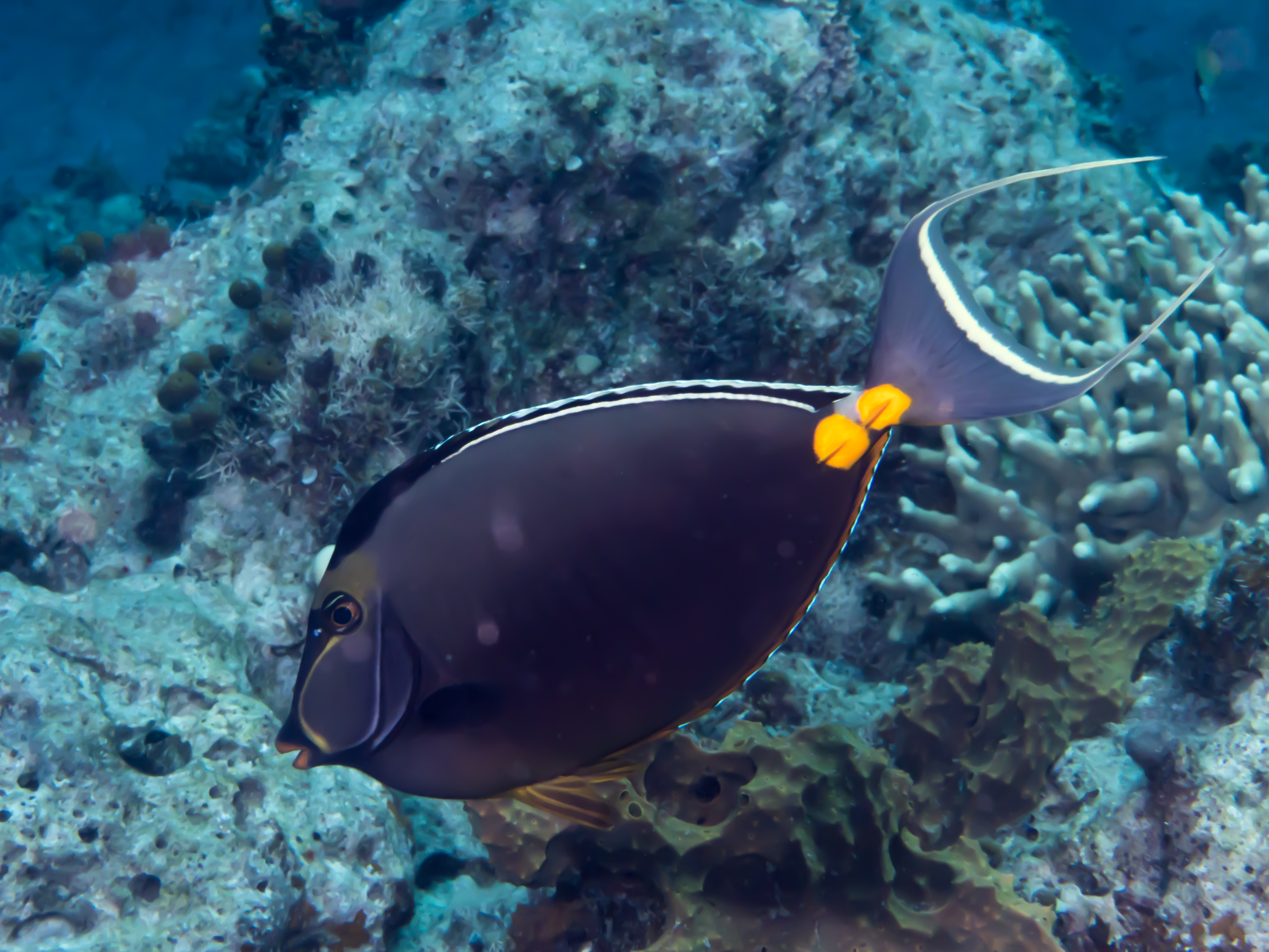
In the Philippines
