= Leucothrix =

Leucothrix is the scientific name of two genera of organisms and may refer to:

- Leucothrix (bacterium), a genus of bacteria in the family Thiotrichaceae
- Leucothrix (fly), a genus of insects in the family Tephritidae
