= Beggiatoa leptomitoformis =

Scientific classification
- Domain: Bacteria
- Kingdom: Pseudomonadati
- Phylum: Pseudomonadota
- Class: Gammaproteobacteria
- Order: Thiotrichales
- Family: Thiotrichaceae
- Genus: Beggiatoa
- Species: B. leptomitoformis

Binomial name
- Beggiatoa leptomitoformis Dubinina et al. 2017

Type strain
- D-402

Species of bacterium

Beggiatoa leptomitoformis is a chemolithoautotrophic bacterium from the genus of Beggiatoa which has been isolated from wastewater from Moscow in Russia.
