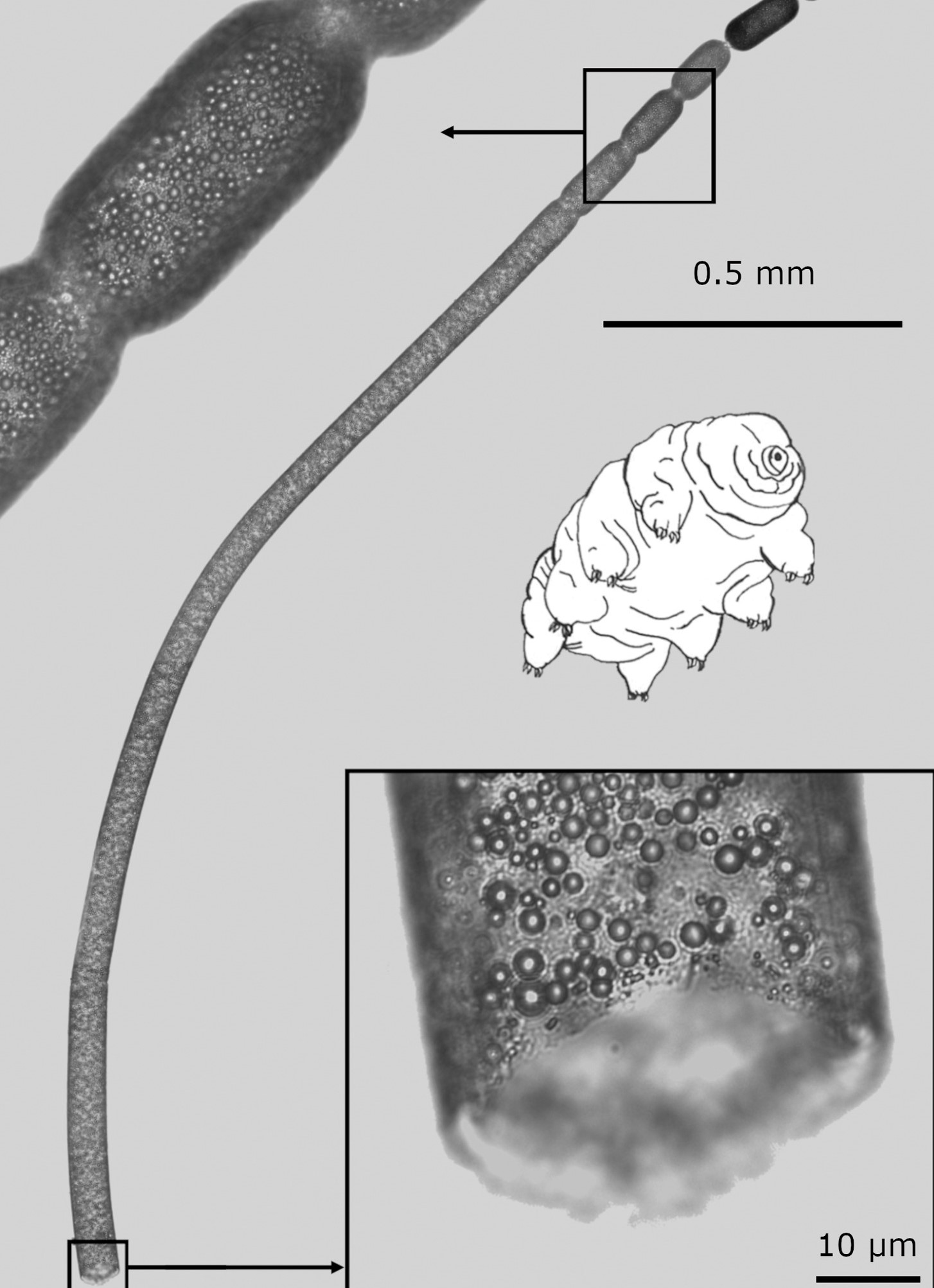
- Light microscopy montage of the upper half of a Ca. T. magnifica cell, with a broken basal part revealing a tube-like morphology due to the large central vacuole and numerous spherical intracellular sulfur granules (a tardigrade is shown for scale)

Scientific classification (Candidatus)
- Domain: Bacteria
- Kingdom: Pseudomonadati
- Phylum: Pseudomonadota
- Class: Gammaproteobacteria
- Order: Thiotrichales
- Family: Thiotrichaceae
- Genus: Thiomargarita
- Species: "Ca. T. magnifica"

Binomial name
- "Candidatus Thiomargarita magnifica" Volland et al., 2022

= Thiomargarita magnifica =

Largest known bacteria species

"Candidatus Thiomargarita magnifica" is a gram-negative species of sulfur-oxidizing gammaproteobacteria, found growing underwater on detached leaves of red mangroves from the Guadeloupe archipelago in the Lesser Antilles. These filament-shaped bacteria are the largest known, with an average length of 1 cm, and some individuals reaching 2 centimetres (0.79 in), making the bacteria visible to humans by unaided eye.

== Discovery ==
The bacterium was discovered in the late 2000s by Olivier Gros from the University of the French Antilles at Pointe-à-Pitre, but initially did not attract much attention as Gros thought his find to be a fungus; it took Gros and other researchers five years to determine that it was a bacterium, and a few more years until Jean-Marie Volland, a graduate student supervised by Gros, determined its unusual properties. The bacterium was described formally in a 2022 publication.

=== Name ===
Thiomargarita means 'sulfur pearl' in Latin. This refers to the appearance of the cells; they contain microscopic sulfur granules that scatter incident light, giving them a pearly lustre. The name magnifica means 'magnificent', and was chosen by researcher Silvina González Rizzo, who identified Ca. T. magnifica as a bacterium.

== Structure ==
In bacteria, both nutrients and waste products of metabolism respectively reach and exit the interior of the cell by diffusion, which places an upper limit on the size of these organisms. Cells of the large sulfur bacterium Thiomargarita namibiensis, discovered in 1999, contain a large sac (vacuole) filled with water and nitrates, which pushes most of the cytoplasm close to the inner surface of the plasma membrane, so that the distances required for diffusion are relatively small (life processes occur only along the outer boundary of the cell). Ca. T. magnifica's cell includes a similar vacuole that occupies most of the cell (65–80% by volume) and pushes the cytoplasm to the periphery of the cell (the thickness of cytoplasm varies from 1.8 to 4.8 microns).

The size of this bacterium and its extreme polyploidy are explained partially by its genome, which lacks many common bacterial cell division genes.

The outside of the cell lacks epibiotic bacteria; their "surprising absence" can be explained by Ca. T. magnifica possibly producing biologically active or even antibiotic chemical compounds.

=== Encapsulated DNA ===
Another sac or compartment within the organism contains its DNA. Researchers have named these compartments pepins. This structure is very different from the free-floating DNA found in most other bacteria. This arrangement is important, in as much as it suggests a form intermediate between prokaryotes, primitive single-cell organisms that do not have a cell nucleus (their DNA floats in the cytoplasm), and eukaryotes, which have DNA surrounded by a nuclear envelope.

== Reproduction and life cycle ==
Like all prokaryotes, Ca. T. magnifica reproduces asexually. However, there are slight differences in reproduction compared to other Thiomargarita species. Instead of dividing into equally-sized daughter cells, its life cycle is dimorphic. Researchers observed a process of reproduction similar to budding. During this process, Ca. T. magnifica shares only some of its pepins with the much smaller daughter cell. It is believed that the smaller daughter cell serves as a method of dispersion, and helps it to spread over greater distances.

== See also ==
- Largest organisms
