= Thioploca chileae =

Scientific classification
- Domain: Bacteria
- Kingdom: Pseudomonadati
- Phylum: Pseudomonadota
- Class: Gammaproteobacteria
- Order: Thiotrichales
- Family: Thiotrichaceae
- Genus: Thioploca
- Species: T. chileae

Binomial name
- Thioploca chileae Maier and Gallardo 1984

Species of bacterium

Thioploca chileae is a marine thioploca from the benthos of the Chilean continental shelf. It is a colonial, multicellular, gliding trichomes of similar diameter enclosed by a shared sheath. It possesses cellular sulfur inclusions located in a thin peripheral cytoplasm surrounding a large, central vacuole. It is a motile organism through gliding. The trichome diameters of Thioploca chileae range from 12 to 20 μm.
