= Thiolava =

"Candidatus Thiolava"

Scientific classification (Candidatus)
- Domain: Bacteria
- Phylum: Pseudomonadota
- Class: Gammaproteobacteria
- Order: Thiotrichales
- Family: Thiotrichaceae
- Genus: "Candidatus Thiolava" Danovaro et al. 2017

Genus of bacteria

"Candidatus Thiolava", represented by its sole species "Candidatus Thiolava veneris" (meaning Venus's hair), is a genus of bacteria discovered growing in stringlike mats after an eruption of the submarine volcano Tagoro near the Canary Islands.

== Physical characteristics ==
Thiolava veneris was found growing in laterally extensive mats in an area recently obliterated by underwater volcanism. The bacteria were discovered growing at about 130 m water depth, near the summit of the submarine volcano Tagoro. The mats of white, hair-like filaments formed by this bacterium cover an area of approximately 2,000 m^{2} around the newly formed volcanic cone. Each bacteria is 3-6 μm, and form white trichomes, or chains consisting of three helical strands surrounded by a protective sheath. The sheaths are 36 to 90 μm wide and up to 3 cm long. Thiolava veneris was initially separated from a hydrothermal vent in the Aegean Sea that was barely 10 meters below the surface.1,2-dichloroethane. Thiolava veneris may grow at temperatures ranging from 15 to 37°C, with optimal growth happening at around 30°C. One of the organisms discovered in the study, which discovered evidence of phytosterol breakdown by the microbial communities, is Thiolava veneris. Thiolava veneris can move through the surrounding water and sediment because it is motile and has many polar flagella. Gram-negative bacteria such as Thiolava veneris have an envelope made up of an outer membrane, a layer of peptidoglycan, and an inner membrane called the cytoplasmic membrane. The microorganisms that live on carbonate crusts close to hydrothermal vents off the coast of Milos, Greece.

== Metabolism ==
Thiolava veneris belongs to the Epsilonproteobacteria, a large bacterial phylogenetic group that also includes other sulfur-oxidizing hydrothermal vent bacteria.Unusually, T. veneris can grow heterotrophically or chemolithotrophically, utilizing sulfur and nitrogen supplied by the volcano.Sulfur compounds and carbon dioxide using oxygen as the electron acceptor can be oxidized by Thiolava veneris to provide energy. This metabolic process is seen in chemolithoautotrophic bacteria. Thiolava lacks an enzyme that would prohibit deposition of elemental sulfur within the cytoplasm, thus allowing for mineral deposition within the cytoplasmic space. The 1,2-dichloroethane, a hazardous industrial chemical, may be broken down by the bacterium, making it a potentially helpful bioremediation tool, according to the researchers.
