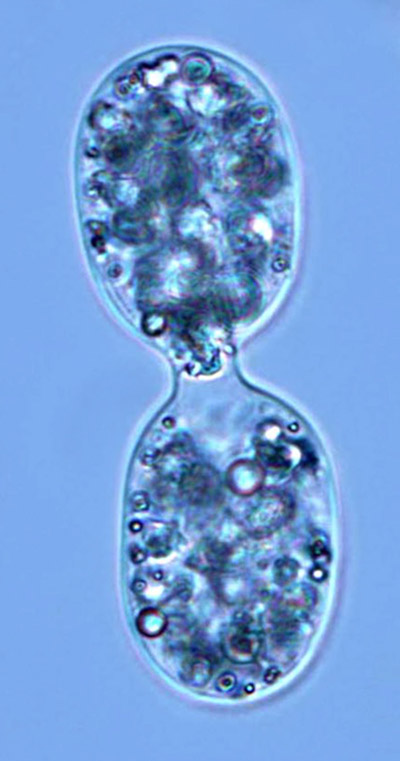
- Dividing Achromatium, light micrograph of living cells.

Scientific classification
- Domain: Bacteria
- Kingdom: Pseudomonadati
- Phylum: Pseudomonadota
- Class: Gammaproteobacteria
- Order: Thiotrichales
- Family: Thiotrichaceae
- Genus: Achromatium; Schewiakoff, 1893 (Approved Lists 1980)
- Species: A. oxaliferum

Binomial name
- Achromatium oxaliferum Schewiakoff 1893 (Approved Lists 1980)

= Achromatium =

Genus of bacteria

Achromatium is a genus in the phylum Pseudomonadota (Bacteria).

== Etymology ==
The name Achromatium derives from:
Greek prefix a- (ἄ), not; Greek noun chroma, color, paint; Neo-Latin neuter gender noun Achromatium, that which is not colored.

== Species ==
The genus contains a single species, namely Achromatium oxaliferum (the type species of the genus); Latin oxalis from the Greek noun oxalis (ὀξαλίς), meaning sorrel, a toxic plant due to oxalic acid production; Latin v. fero, to carry; Neo-Latin neuter gender adjective oxaliferum, oxalate-containing. (Note: The etymology on the paper is listed to stem from the greek, which actually means "sour wine" and if that were the case it would be A. oxaloferum. for info on linking vowels see Bacterial taxonomy)
