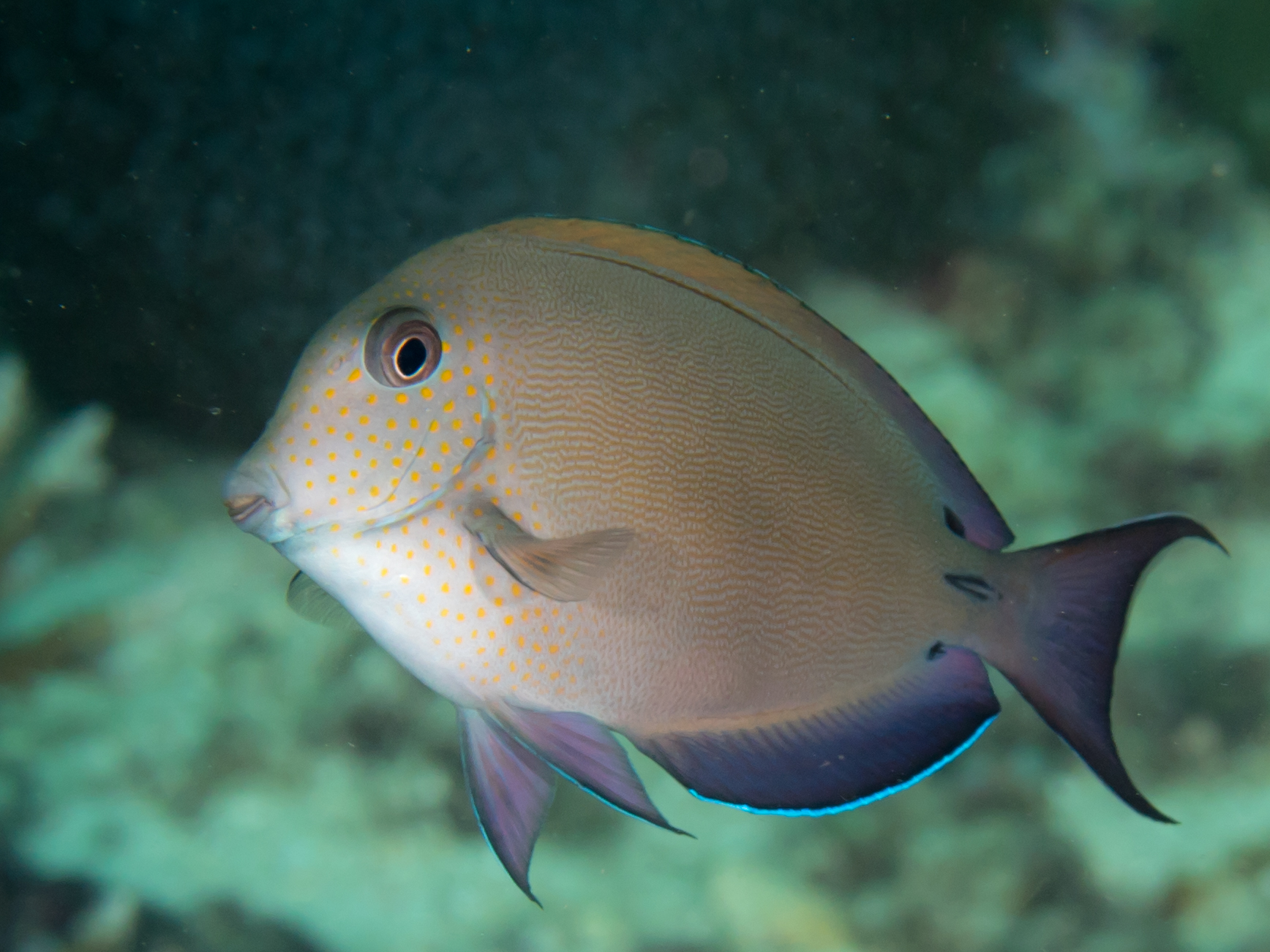
- In Indonesia

Conservation status
- Least Concern (IUCN 3.1)

Scientific classification
- Kingdom: Animalia
- Phylum: Chordata
- Class: Actinopterygii
- Division: Teleostei
- Order: Acanthuriformes
- Family: Acanthuridae
- Genus: Acanthurus
- Species: A. nigrofuscus

Binomial name
- Acanthurus nigrofuscus (Forsskål, 1775)

Synonyms
- List: Chaetodon nigrofuscus Forsskål, 1775; Acanthurus rubropunctatus Rüppell, 1829; Ctenodon rubropunctatus (Rüppell, 1829); Acanthurus fuliginosus Lesson, 1831; Hepatus fuliginosus (Lesson, 1831); Acanthurus lineolatus Valenciennes, 1835; Hepatus lineolatus (Valenciennes, 1835); Acanthurus matoides Valenciennes, 1835; Hepatus lucillae Fowler, 1938; Teuthis lucillae (Fowler, 1938)

= Acanthurus nigrofuscus =

Species of fish

Acanthurus nigrofuscus, the brown surgeonfish, blackspot surgeonfish, brown tang, dusky surgeon, lavender tang or spot-cheeked surgeonfish, is a species of marine ray-finned fish belonging to the family Acanthuridae, which includes the surgeonfishes, unicornishes and tangs. This species is a common and abundant fish occurring across a wide Indo-Pacific range.

== Taxonomy ==
Acanthurus nigrofuscus was first formally described as Chaetodon nigrofuscus in 1775 by the Swedish-speaking Finnish explorer, orientalist and naturalist Peter Forsskål with its type locality given as Jeddah.

== Etymology ==
Acanthuurus nigrofuscus was given the subspecific name, nigrofuscus combining nigro, meaning "black", with fuscus, meaning "dark" a reference to the dusky or brownish-black colour of this fish.

== Distribution and habitat ==
Acanthurus nigrofuscus has a wide Indo-Pacific distribution from the coast of eastern Africa as far north as the Levantine Red Sea coast and as far south as the Aliwal Shoal in South Africa, across the Indian Ocean as far east as the Pitcairn Islands and Hawaii, north as far as southern Japan and south as far as New South Wales.

This is a numerous and common surgeonfish that is found in small schools on sheltered coral and rocky reefs, frequently around isolated rocky reefs at depths down to 25 m (82 ft).

== Description ==
In Japan

Acanthurus nigrofuscus has been recorded growing up to a total length of 21 cm (8.3 in). It has 9 spines and between 24 and 27 soft rays supporting its dorsal fin while the anal fin is supported by 3 spines and 22 to 24 soft rays. The dorsal profile of the head his slightly humped.

The overall colour varies from brown to purplish to bluish-brown marked with small orange spots on the head and breast. There are small black spots at the base of both the dorsal and anal fins, these fins have a pale blue margin. The spine on the caudal peduncle is contained within a patch of black pigment. There may or may not be sinuous horizontal lines of small blue dots.

== Biology ==
Juvenile

Acanthurus nigrofuscus grazes on benthic algae. Although typically encountered in small groups it will form large schools in oceanic areas, as well as gathering in large spawning aggregations. This is a relatively small surgeonfish and may be dominated by other larger species but the large schools they form can displace other grazing fish.

=== Symbiotic bacteria ===
Acanthurus nigrofuscus has been found to be the host of an unusually large symbiotic bacteria discovered in its intestine, Epulopiscium fishelsoni, this species has been found to grow as large as 600 by 80 μm, a little smaller than a printed hyphen, which controls the pH of its host's gut, thereby influencing its host's ability to digest food and absorb nutrients.

== Utilisation ==
Acanthurus nigrofuscus is taken as bycatch in some fisheries, and the flesh is consumed either raw or cooked. It is taken for the aquarium trade.

== Gallery ==
In Hawaii

In Mozambique
