= Thiothrix =

Scientific classification
- Domain: Bacteria
- Kingdom: Pseudomonadati
- Phylum: Pseudomonadota
- Class: Gammaproteobacteria
- Order: Thiotrichales
- Family: Thiotrichaceae
- Genus: Thiothrix; Winogradsky 1888

Genus of bacteria

Thiothrix is a genus of filamentous sulfur-oxidizing bacteria, related to the genera Beggiatoa and Thioploca. They are usually Gram-negative (but can be Gram-variable) and rod-shaped (0.7–1.5 μm in width by 1.2–2.5 μm in length). They form ensheathed multicellular filaments that are attached at the base, and form gonidia at their free end. The apical gonidia have gliding motility. Rosettes of the filaments are not always formed but are typical. Sulfur is deposited in invaginations within the cell membrane.

== Species ==
- Thiothrix nivea Rabenhorst 1865) Winogradsky 1888
- Thiothrix fructosivorans Howarth et al 1999
- Thiothrix unzii Howarth et al 1999
- Thiothrix caldifontis Chernousova 2009
- Thiothrix lacustris
- Thiothrix litoralis
- Thiothrix subterranea
- "Candidatus Thiothrix anitrata"
- "Candidatus Thiothrix singaporensis"
- "Candidatus Thiothrix moscowensis"

== Habitat ==
Thiothrix live primarily in flowing water containing a source of sulfide but are also present in activated-sludge waste water treatment systems. They are aerobic or microaerophilic in their oxygen requirements. Thiothrix species can be facultative autotrophs, chemoorganotrophs and mixotrophs. The temperature range for growth can vary from cold springs to hot vents while salinity can vary from fresh to ocean water. Thiothrix can be found in symbiotic relationships with other organisms.
