= Leucothrix (bacterium) =

Scientific classification
- Domain: Bacteria
- Kingdom: Pseudomonadati
- Phylum: Pseudomonadota
- Class: Gammaproteobacteria
- Order: Thiotrichales
- Family: Thiotrichaceae
- Genus: Leucothrix; Örsted 1844 (Approved Lists 1980)

Species
- Leucothrix arctica Leucothrix mucor Leucothrix pacifica Leucothrix sargassi

Genus of bacteria

Leucothrix is a genus of large, filamentous bacteria, which live as epiphytes in marine habitats.

== Systematics ==
Leucothrix Oersted, 1844 is the type genus of the family Leucothricaceae Buchanan, 1957, but has also been classified in the family Thiotrichaceae (Gammaproteobacteria). There are two species described, L. mucor Oersted, 1844 (type species) and L. pacifica Zhang et al., 2015.

== Description ==
Leucothrix is a large bacterium that forms filaments between 2-3 μm wide and up to 0.5 cm in length. They are usually found as epiphytes on marine plants and algae, but also grow attached to other surfaces like the shells of crustaceans. Like the related genus Thiothrix, individual cells can be released from filaments, forming "gonidia", which can disperse and colonize new surfaces. On a new surface, the gonidial cells associate, produce a holdfast, and develop into rosettes of new filaments. Filaments of L. mucor can sometimes grow into knots when cultivated in the laboratory under certain conditions.

Physiologically, Leucothrix are chemoheterotrophic, which distinguishes them from Thiothrix, which are able to use sulfur oxidation as a source of energy.
