= Metabacterium =

Scientific classification
- Domain: Bacteria
- Phylum: Bacillota
- Class: Clostridia
- Order: incertae sedis
- Family: incertae sedis
- Genus: Metabacterium Chatton & Perard 1913
- Species: M. polyspora

Binomial name
- Metabacterium polyspora Chatton & Perard 1913

Genus of bacteria

Metabacterium polyspora is an unusual multiple endospore-producing bacterium isolated from the cecum of guinea pigs. It is the only species in the genus Metabacterium. This bacterium is physically similar to the phylogenetically related surgeonfish intestinal symbiont Epulopiscium fishelsoni.
