= Epulonipiscium =

"Candidatus Epulonipiscium"

Scientific classification (Candidatus)
- Domain: Bacteria
- Phylum: Bacillota
- Class: Clostridia
- Order: Lachnospirales
- Family: Cellulosilyticaceae
- Genus: "Candidatus Epulonipiscium" corrig. Montgomery and Pollak 1988

Type species
- "Candidatus Epulonipiscium fishelsonii" corrig. Montgomery and Pollak 1988

Species
- "Ca. E. fishelsoni"; "Ca. E. viviparum"

Synonyms
- "Ca. Epulopiscium" (sic) Montgomery and Pollak 1988

Genus of bacteria

Candidatus Epulopiscium is a genus of Gram-positive bacteria that have a symbiotic relationship with surgeonfish. These bacteria are known for their unusually large size, many ranging from 0.2 - 0.7 mm (200–700 μm) in length. Until the discovery of Thiomargarita namibiensis in 1999, Epulonipiscium species were thought to be the largest bacteria. They are still the largest known heterotrophic bacteria.

In addition to their large size, Epulonipiscium, commonly referred to as "epulos," are morphologically diverse and extremely polyploid. Epulos also have unique reproductive strategies in which certain cells can form intracellular offspring, similar to microbial sporulation; furthermore, several epulo morphologies exhibit sporulation.

While the bacteria have not been successfully grown in the lab, scientists have gained a better understanding of Epulonipiscium through microscopic, phylogenetic, and genomic analyses.

== Naming and discovery ==
Epulonipiscium means "a guest at a banquet of fish" in Latin, from epulo ("guest at a feast" or "guest at a banquet") and piscium ("of a fish"), as the organism was found inside the gut of marine surgeonfish. Epulonipiscium cells were initially classified as protists on the basis of their large size and unusual ultrastructure.

Originally, Epulonipiscium populations were thought to be a single species and given the name Epulopiscium fishelsoni in 1988, by Montgomery (one of the co-discovers) and Pollak. The epithet fishelsoni honors Lev Fishelson, a Polish-born Israeli ichthyologist who was part of the group that made the discovery while studying the intestines of a brown surgeonfish from the Red Sea in 1985.

Later, however, Epulopiscium fishelsoni was shown to comprise two phylogenetically distinct groups of bacteria by Angert and collaborators using rRNA gene sequence comparisons. Subsequent studies illustrated the relationship between these symbionts and the host surgeonfish.

== Physiology ==
The largest Epulonipiscium cells can be seen with the naked eye. However, because of their size, Epulonipiscium cells must compensate for their small surface-to-volume ratio, compared to other bacteria. One distinct feature is the cell membrane, which contains many folds to increase the effective surface area.

Additionally, Epulonipiscium cells are extremely polyploid, with individuals containing hundreds of thousands of copies of the genome. Since bacteria rely on diffusion rather than cytoskeletal transport as in eukaryotes, this extreme polyploidy allows for the production of gene products at numerous sites in the cell to produce biomolecules where they are needed.

== Reproduction ==
Epulonipiscium species type B life cycle.

The largest Epulonipiscium morphologies exhibit a unique viviparous reproduction. This unusual and derived form of sporulation produces anywhere from one to twelve daughter cells that grow inside of the parent cell, until the parent eventually lyses, and dies. These cells appear to not use binary fission for reproduction. Some morphologies use endospore formation for reproduction. However, there are some smaller morphologies that reproduce through binary fission and spore formation.

Although sporulation is widespread among other bacteria (such as Bacillus subtilis and Clostridium species) in the phylum Bacillota, spore formation is usually brought about by overcrowding, the accumulation of toxins in the environment, or starvation, rather than a standard form of reproduction. The production of multiple endospores has been observed in other large gut symbionts such as Metabacterium polyspora, which are phylogenetically related to Epulonipiscium. Since sporulation affords bacteria much more protection from the outside environment than binary fission, it is thought that the evolution of this unusual life cycle may assist transfer of the bacteria from one host to another.

== Symbiosis ==
Epulonipiscium species and their surgeonfish hosts are suggested to have a nutritional symbiotic relationship: Epulonipiscium species have only been found in surgeonfish that eat algae and detritus. It is suggested that Epulonipiscium species assist in the fish's digestion. However, scientists have been unable to culture Epulonipiscium outside of its natural habitat.
