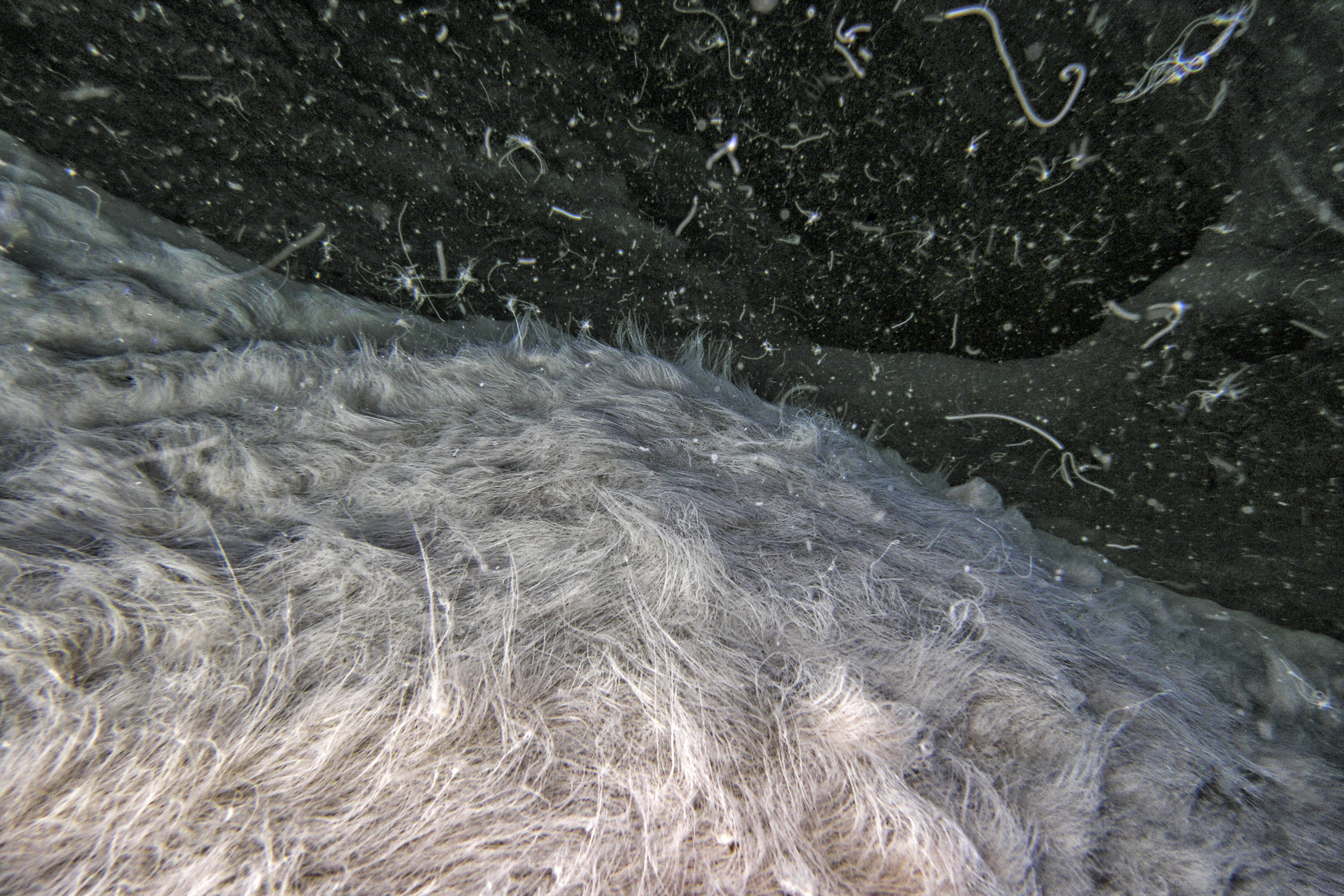

Scientific classification
- Domain: Bacteria
- Kingdom: Pseudomonadati
- Phylum: Pseudomonadota
- Class: Gammaproteobacteria
- Order: Thiotrichales
- Family: Thiotrichaceae
- Genus: Beggiatoa; Trevisan 1842

Species
- Beggiatoa alba Beggiatoa leptomitoformis

= Beggiatoa =

Genus of bacteria

Beggiatoa is a genus of Gammaproteobacteria belonging to the order Thiotrichales, in the Pseudomonadota phylum. These bacteria form colorless filaments composed of cells that can be up to 200 μm in diameter, and are one of the largest prokaryotes on Earth. Beggiatoa are chemolithotrophic sulfur-oxidizers, using reduced sulfur species as an energy source. They live in sulfur-rich environments such as soil, both marine and freshwater, in the deep sea hydrothermal vents, and in polluted marine environments. In association with other sulfur bacteria, e.g. Thiothrix, they can form biofilms that are visible to the naked eye as mats of long white filaments; the white color is due to sulfur globules stored inside the cells.

== Discovery ==
Beggiatoa was originally described as a type of blue-green algae (today known as Cyanobacteria) by the botanist Vittore Trevisan in 1842, who named it in honor of the Italian doctor and botanist Francesco Secondo Beggiato (1806 - 1883), from Venice. Later, it was shown that Beggiatoa in their natural habitat of sulfur springs accumulate sulfur globules in their cells. The Ukrainian microbiologist Sergei Winogradsky, working in the laboratory of Anton de Bary, showed that these intracellular sulfur globules were formed when Beggiatoa oxidized hydrogen sulfide (H_{2}S) as an energy source, with oxygen as the terminal electron acceptor and CO_{2} used as a carbon source. Winogradsky referred to this form of metabolism as "inorgoxidation" (oxidation of inorganic compounds), today called chemolithotrophy. The finding represented the first discovery of lithotrophy.

== Taxonomy ==
The genus Beggiatoa is diverse, with representatives occupying several habitats and niches, both in fresh and salt water. In the past, they have been confused as close relatives of Oscillatoria spp. (phylum Cyanobacteria) because they have similar morphology and motility, but 5S rRNA analysis showed that members of Beggiatoa are phylogenetically distant from Cyanobacteria, and are instead members of the phylum Gammaproteobacteria.

Despite their diversity, only two species of Beggiatoa have been formally described: the type species Beggiatoa alba and Beggiatoa leptomitoformis, the latter of which was only published in 2017.

The capability to oxidize sulfide and store sulfur are the main features which define Beggiatoa and its close relative Thioploca as filamentous colorless sulfur bacteria, in contrast to other filamentous bacteria like cyanobacteria and the non-sulfur-oxidizing Cytophaga and Flexibacter. Another defining feature is the ability to store nitrate inside the vacuoles of the wide marine species' cells. 16S rRNA sequences base studies inferred that this characteristic is shared between members of a monophyletic clade nested in the Beggiatoa genera; this clade also includes members of Thioploca and Thiomargarita, both presenting only slight differences with Beggiatoas: whereas the former grows sharing a common slime sheath, the latter has not conserved filamentous growth and forms chains of rounded cells. Since the phylogenic history do not reflect the nomenclature, there is a need for a new denomination of genera and species. The Neo-type strain is the B18LB and it settled the criteria for identification of the freshwater species Beggiatoa alba.

== Genetics ==
Because of the lack of a pure culture, little is known about the genetics of Beggiatoa. Beggiatoa alba has a GC content between 40 and 42.7 mol%, two or three similar plasmids, and a genome size of about 3 Megabase (Mbp) (strain B18LD). In a study on Beggiatoa genome sequences obtained from two single filaments of a vacuolated strain, optical mapping showed that the genome size was about 7.4 Mbp; pathways for sulfur oxidation, nitrate and oxygen respiration, and CO_{2} fixation were detected, confirming its chemolithoautotrophic physiology. Furthermore, comparative genomics indicated horizontal gene transfer between Beggiatoa and Cyanobacteria of storage, metabolic, and gliding abilities.

== Morphology and motility ==
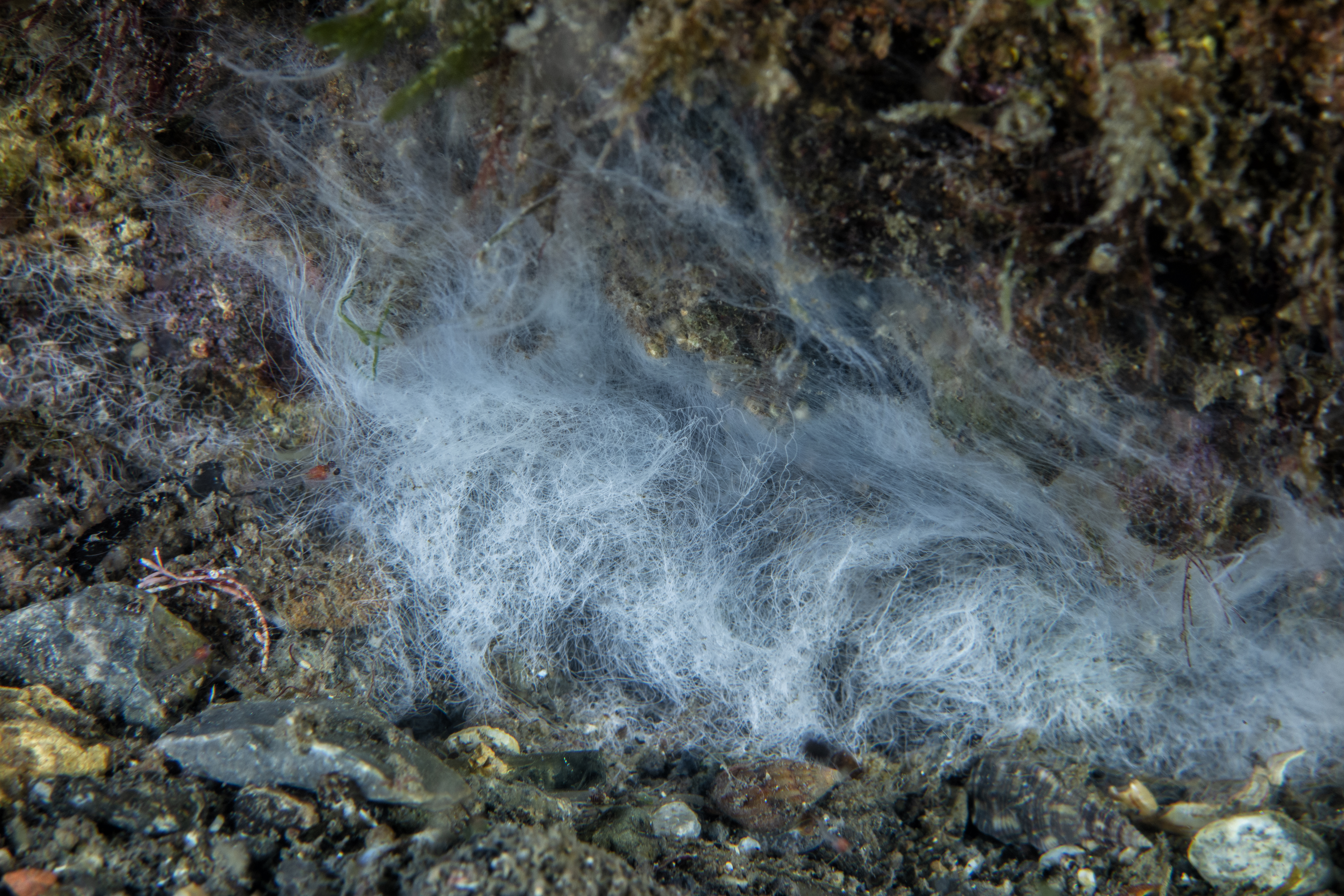
Beggiatoa-like filaments underwater

Beggiatoa spp. can be divided into three morphological categories (with some exceptions):

1. Freshwater strains, characterized by narrow filaments with no vacuoles;
2. Narrow marine strains, without vacuoles (filaments' diameter of about 4.4 μm);
3. Larger marine strains, with vacuoles for nitrate storing (filaments' diameter vary between 5 and 140 μm)

Narrow filaments are usually composed of cylindrical cells whose length is about 1.5 to 8 times their thickness; in wider filaments, cells are instead disk-shaped with cell lengths from 0.10 to 0.90 times their cell width. In all of the cultured strains the terminal cells of the filaments appear rounded.

Although they are Gram-negative bacteria, Beggiatoa show unusual cell-wall and membrane organization. A variable number of further membranes that cover the peptidoglycan layer are sometimes present. Their presence may be due to the harsh conditions in which some of these organisms live. Intracellular granules can also be covered by membranous structures. In addition to sulfur granules, Beggiatoa cells often contain granules of polyhydroxybutyrate and polyphosphate. Large marine vacuolated Beggiatoa commonly have cells with a narrow cytoplasm surrounding a large central vacuole used to store nitrate.

Beggiatoa move via gliding motility, using the excretion of mucus. The exact mechanisms of this gliding motility are unknown. In the species Beggiatoa alba, this trail of mucus is composed of mannose and glucose, two types of neutral polysaccharide. String-like structures on the outer membrane and trans-peptidoglycan channels have been observed on the surface layer, which also may play a role. Beggiatoa gliding motility is induced via chemotaxis, which allows filaments to direct themselves away from high oxygen, sulfide, and light levels. Beggiatoa filaments reverse their gliding direction to reach more suitable conditions for their metabolism. Long filaments moving in opposite directions may split in two by killing an intermediate cell, referred to as a necrida, which then cuts off communication and coordinated movement between the two segments.

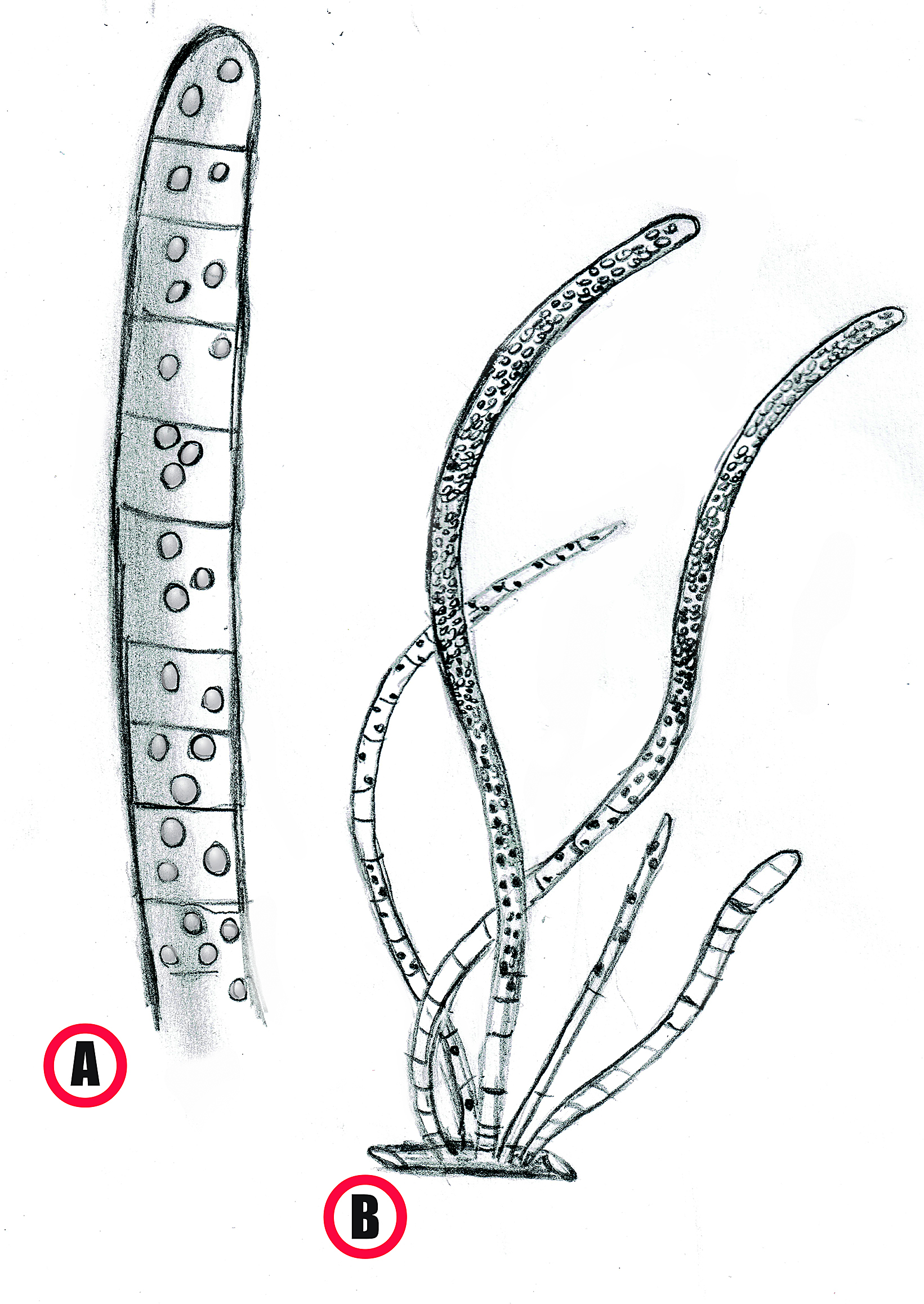
A drawing of Beggiatoa alba: A) Particular of intracellular sulfur droplets. B) Kinds of filament arrangement.

== Cell growth ==
Beggiatoa use fragmentation as a reproductive strategy. A colony can develop into a mat through alternating filament elongation and breakage. Breakage can happen in the middle of a stretched filament, at the tip of a filament loop, or where a tip of a loop was once placed. Sacrificial cells interrupt the communication between two parts of one filament; in this way each section can change its gliding direction causing the split.

The average filament length achieved through this process is also result of gene-environment interactions as, for instance, the growth and position of the filament is function of vertical gradients of oxygen and sulfide. Therefore, it is proposed that good environmental conditions will paradoxically cause cell death in order to enhance filament breakage, thus reproduction.

== Metabolism ==
Beggiatoa group is mainly composed by chemolithotrophic, sulfide-oxidizing bacteria. However, the range of possible metabolic pathways is very diversified, varying from the heterotrophy to the chemolithoautotrophy. Because of this huge variability the diverse bacteria of this genus can differ greatly from each other.

=== Carbon metabolism ===
In Beggiatoa group are present both autotrophic and heterotrophic metabolisms. Autotrophic Beggiatoa carry out the CO_{2} fixation through the Calvin cycle and the employment of the RuBisCO enzyme. The latter shows different regulation levels in obligated and facultative autotrophs. For instance, in the obligately autotrophic strain MS-81-1c RuBisCO cannot be repressed, while in the facultatively autotrophic strain MS-81-6 it is tightly regulated to switch from autotrophic to heterotrophic growth and vice versa. Beside the autotrophic strains, most of the freshwater Beggiatoa strains are heterotrophic, requiring organic substrates for growth. Specifically, many of them can be considered mixotrophs, because they grow heterotrophically, oxidizing organic compounds, but they can also use sulfide or other reduced sulfur compounds as electron donors. By this strategy, the organic carbon skeletons are saved for the purpose of increasing biomass and the CO_{2} autotrophic fixation is not required. Mixotrophy has been suspected to be the trophic modality for many freshwater strains, but it has only been found in one marine strain of Beggiatoa, MS-81-6. Also a metabolic pathway of C-1 compounds utilization has been revealed in Beggiatoa leptomitoformis strain D-402, through comprehensive analysis of its genomic, biochemistry, physiology and molecular biology.

=== Nitrogen metabolism ===
Beggiatoa group shows substantial versatility in utilizing nitrogen compounds. Nitrogen can be a source for growth or, in the case of nitrate, it can be an electron acceptor for anaerobic respiration. Heterotrophic freshwater Beggiatoa spp. assimilate nitrogen for growth. Nitrogen sources include nitrate, nitrite, ammonia, amino acids, urea, aspartate, asparagine, alanine and thiourea, depending on the capability of specific strains.

Autotrophic vacuolated Beggiatoa are able to store nitrate in their vacuoles 20.000 times the concentration of the surrounding sea water, and use it as terminal electron acceptor in anoxic conditions. This process, called Dissimilatory Nitrate Reduction to Ammonium (DNRA), reduces nitrate to ammonium. The capability of using nitrate as electron acceptor allows the colonization of anoxic environments, such as microbial mats and sediments. Several species are able to fix nitrogen using nitrogenase enzyme (e.g. Beggiatoa alba).

=== Sulfur metabolism ===
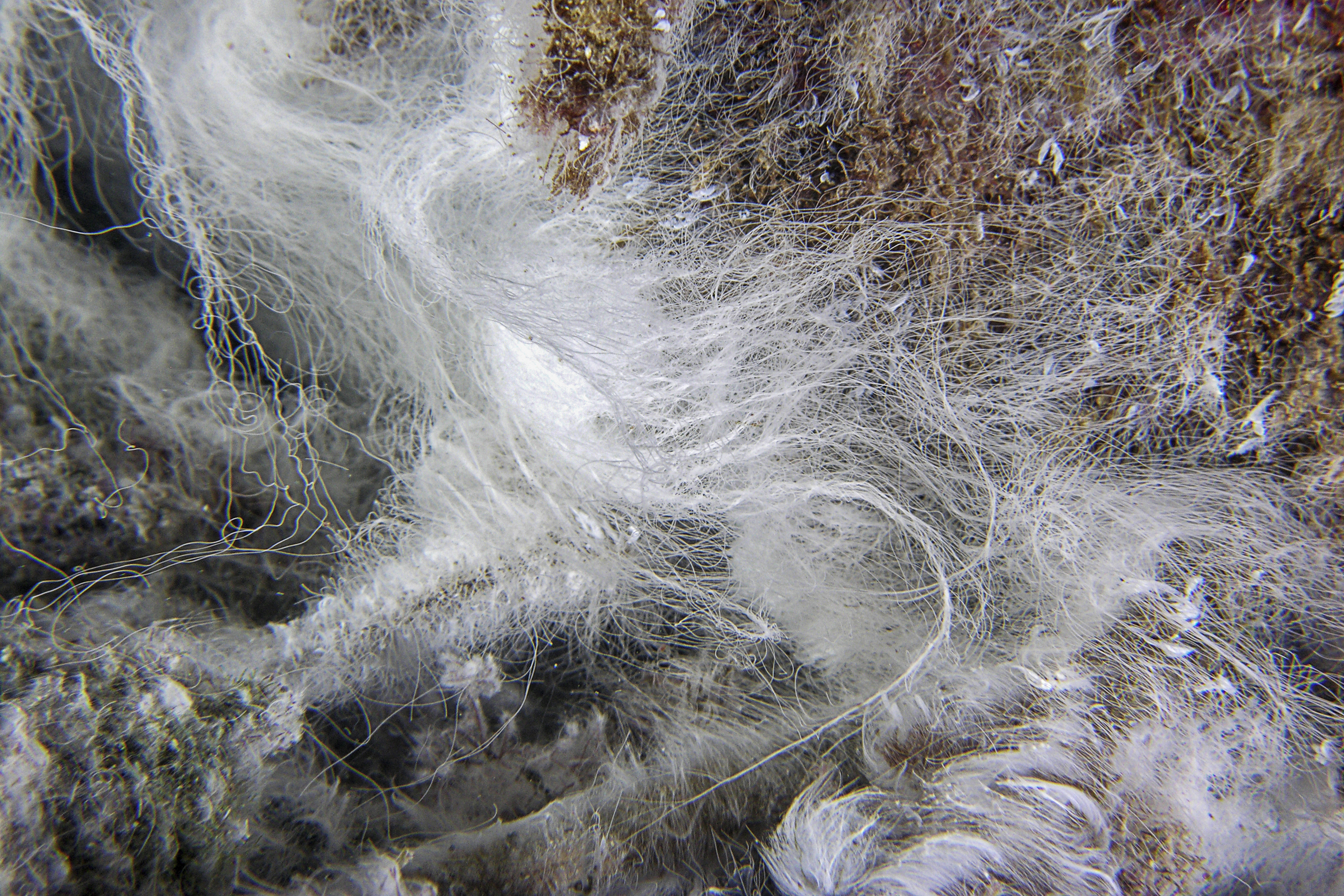
Biofilm of Beggiatoa-like filaments

One of the defining features of the genus Beggiatoa is the production of intracellular inclusions of sulfur resulting from the oxidation of reduced sulfur sources (e.g. hydrogen sulfide). In autotrophic Beggiatoa, sulfide is a source of energy and electrons for carbon fixation and growth. The oxidation of sulfide can be aerobic or anaerobic, in fact it can be coupled with the reduction of oxygen or with the reduction of nitrate. Sulfur produced by the oxidation of sulfide is stored into internal globules and can be used when the concentration of sulfide decreases. Thus, the temporarily storing of elemental sulfur (S^{0}) increase the adaptability of an organism and its tolerance to changes in the concentrations of sulfide and oxygen.

Sulfide aerobic oxidation: $\ce{H2S + 1/2O2 -> S^0 + H2O}$

Sulfide anaerobic oxidation: $\ce{4H2S + NO3^- + 2H+ -> 4S^0 + NH4^+ + 3H2O}$

There are some cases of chemoorganotrophy, too. For instance, the strain Beggiatoa sp. 35Flor usually do an aerobic respiration coupled with the oxidation of sulfide, but in anoxic condition a different type of respiration is activated. The energy is gained chemoorganotrophically from oxidation of PHA (polyhydroxyalkanoates), organic compounds previously synthesized through CO_{2} fixation during chemolithotrophic growth on oxygen and sulfide. In this case electron acceptor is the sulfur stored into the cell, so the final product is hydrogen sulfide.

Anaerobic respiration: $\ce{PHA + S^0 -> CO2 + H2S}$

=== Hydrogen metabolism ===
The strain Beggiatoa sp. 35Flor is able to use hydrogen as alternative electron donor to sulfide. This oxidation process can provide energy for maintenance and assimilatory purposes and is helpful to reduce stored sulfur when it becomes excessive, but it can't provide growth to the strain.

Hydrogen oxidation: $\ce{H2 + S^0 -> H2S}$

=== Phosphorus metabolism ===
Beggiatoa's metabolism include the use of phosphorus in the polyphosphate form. The regulation of this metabolism relies on the environmental conditions. Oxygenated surroundings cause an accumulation of polyphosphate, while anoxia (coupled with an increasing concentration of sulfide) produces a breakdown of polyphosphate and its subsequent release from the cells. The released phosphate can then be deposited as phosphorite minerals in the sediments or stay dissolved in the water.

== Ecology ==
Filaments have been observed to form dense mats on sediments in a very huge variety of environments. They appear as a whitish layer and since they are present and flourish in marine environments which have been subject to pollution, they can be considered as an indicator species. Beggiatoa and other related filamentous bacteria can cause settling problems in sewage treatment plants, industrial waste lagoons in canning, paper pulping, brewing, milling, causing the phenomenon called "bulking". Beggiatoa are also able to detoxify hydrogen sulfide in soil and have a role in the immobilization of heavy metals.

Beggiatoa live at the oxic/anoxic interface, where they benefit from the presence of both hydrogen sulfide and oxygen. The chemolithoautotrophic strains of Beggiatoa are also considered important primary producers in dark environments.

=== Habitat ===
The incredible number of adaptations and metabolisms of this genus of bacteria are consequences of the extraordinary environmental variability they can live in. Beggiatoa is almost benthic, it can be found in marine (Beggiatoa sp. MS-81-6 and MS-81-1c) or freshwater (Beggiatoa alba) environments and they only need sulfide or thiosulfide as electron donor and an oxidizer. They can usually be found in habitats that have high levels of hydrogen sulfide, these environments include cold seeps, sulfur springs, sewage contaminated water, mud layers of lakes, and near deep hydrothermal vents. Beggiatoa can also be found in the rhizosphere of swamp plants, in soil, marine sediments and in the mangrove lagoon too (where they contribute to the lipid pool of the sediments). The freshwater species have typical habitats in sulfur springs, ditches, puddles, wetlands, lake sediments and in rice fields, where it can grow associated with the rice plants' roots. The Beggiatoa that live in marine water can be found in regions where their source of energy (sulfide or thiosulfide) is available. It can be extracted from both inorganic or organic source and usually it is coupled with microoxic condition, therefore very low concentration of oxygen. This genus of Gammaprotobacteria is also common in localized area of anaerobic decomposition, such as whale carcasses on the deep ocean seafloor.

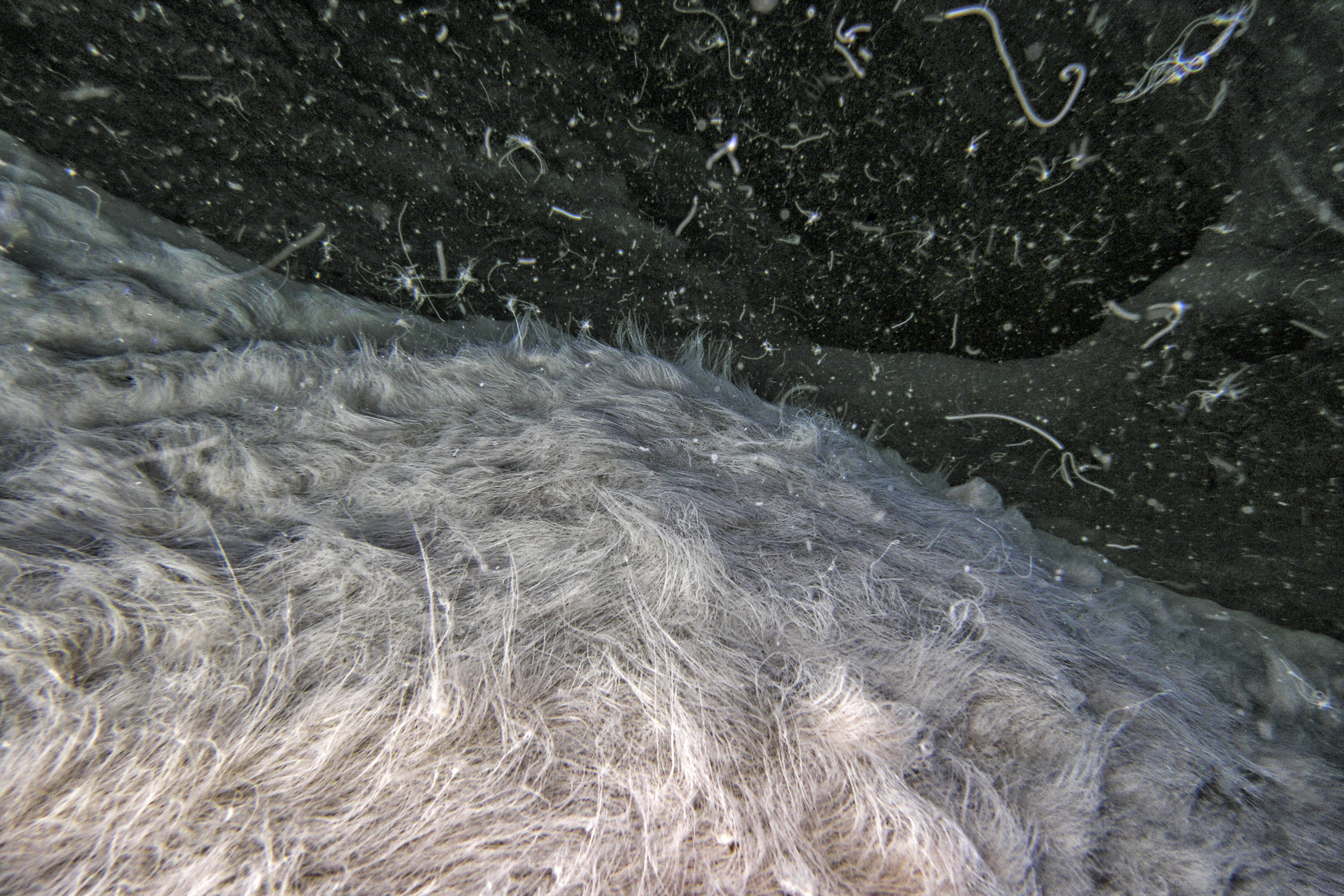
A Beggiatoa-like bacterial mat filaments in underwater cave.

Vacuolated Beggiatoa can be very common in coastal upwelling regions (for example Peru and Chile coasts), deep sea hydrothermal vents and cold vents; in these environments the floc mats (hair-like breast) can grow up and cover large areas and reach the height of 30 cm. In deep sea hydrothermal vents and cold-seeps Beggiatoa can grow in filaments that can be up to 200 micrometres in diameter, which makes these ones the largest prokaryotes currently known. Vacuolated Beggiatoa can be found also in hypoxic seafloor, where the filaments can live inside the sediments at the depth of few cm (from 2 to 4 cm); in same cases the Beggiatoa bacterial filaments can be the most abundant part of the microbial biomass in the sediments.

Beggiatoa is also found in salt marshes, saline, and geothermally active underwater caves. Some studies on these environments have been carried out in the underwater caves of dolomitized limestone in Capo Palinuro, Salerno, (Italy). Here there are hydrothermal sulphidic springs and microbial biofilm is associated with the flow of hydrothermal fluids, whose activity is intermittent and starts during low tide. Mats found in the caves were composed by filaments resembling in most part Beggiatoa, Thiothrix and Flexibacter, and this Beggiatoa-like filaments were morphologically close to those found attached to rocks and the byssus of the mussels from Lucky Strike Hydrothermal vents on the Mid-Atlantic Ridge.

=== Interactions with other organisms ===
Beggiatoa can form complex microbial mats in association with other filamentous bacteria, such as cyanobacteria. The cyanobacteria usually occupy the surface layer of the mat, and produce a great amount of oxygen during the day through photosynthesis. Conversely, Beggiatoa grow beneath the phototrophs, along an oxic/anoxic (oxygen/sulfide) interface, where they produce white patches. However, during dark acclimation, the mat became anoxic, so the Beggiatoa moved to the mat surface, to avoid the high levels of H_{2}S and remain at the oxygen/sulfide interface, while cyanobacteria remained in a dense layer below. Sometimes Beggiatoa mats are enriched by the presence of diatoms and green euglenoids too, but also protists as ciliates and dinoflagellates have been found associated with the mats at the Guaymas Basin hydrothermal vent ecosystem and they likely consume a large amount of bacterial biomass.

As the microbial mats can reach 3 cm in width, they can be a food source for many grazers. This trophic connection has been observed in mangrove systems, where Beggiatoa cover part of marine sediments. The bacteria contribute to the diet of meiofauna, in particular rotifers, polychaetes, nematodes and some groups of platyhelminthes, aschelminths and gnathostomulids. Nematodes seem to encourage development of Beggiatoa mats, by increasing oxygen penetration and nutrient diffusion into the mat.

Furthermore, many carrion appear covered by mats of Beggiatoa-like filamentous bacteria that overlie anaerobic sulfate-reducing bacteria. They attract many metazoans scavengers, but when they break the mat, it releases hydrogen sulphide that drives away the scavengers. Hence, Beggiatoa can also be considered a carrion defence from the scavengers.

=== Role in biogeochemical cycles ===
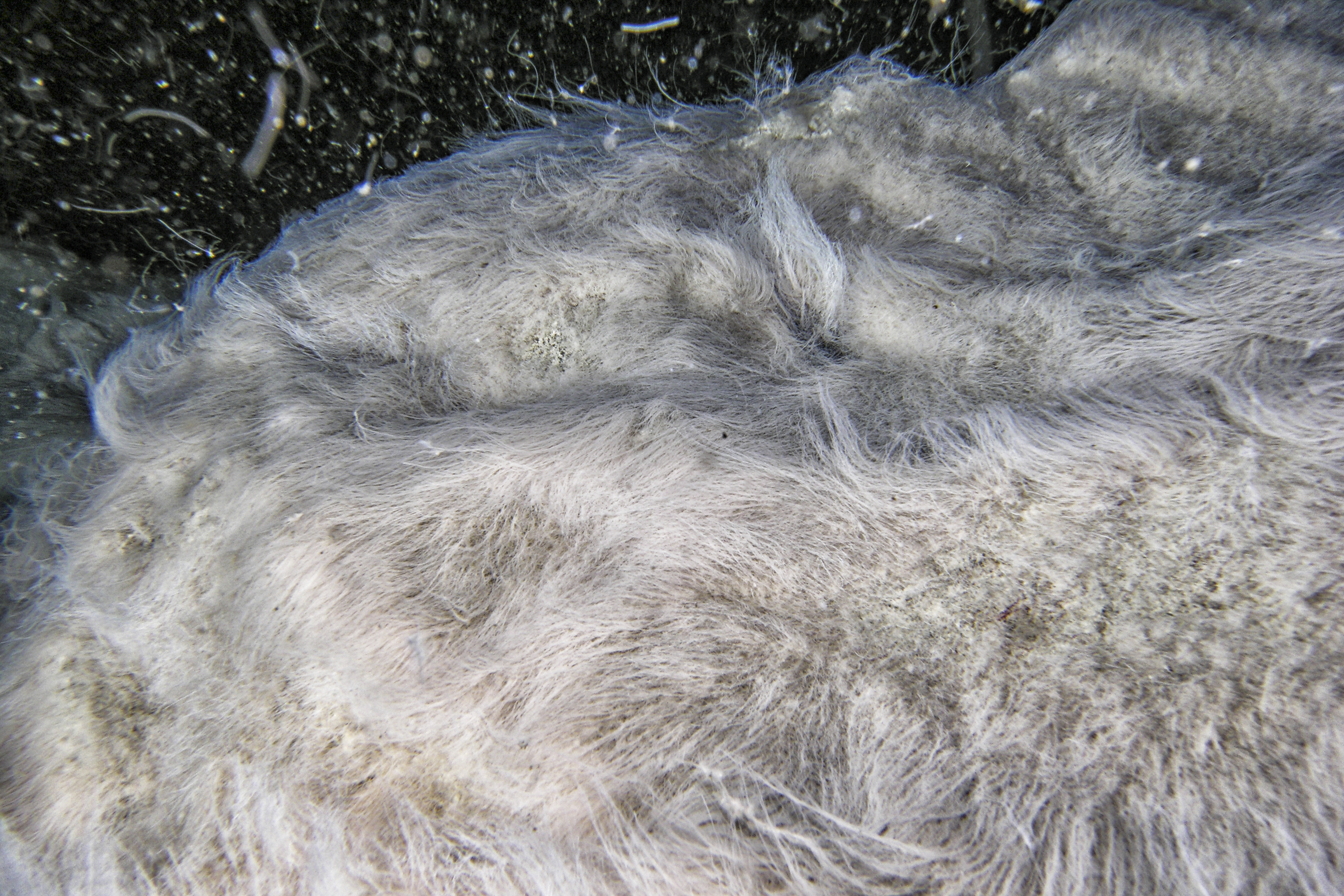
Massive mats of some Beggiatoa-like filaments in an underwater cave

Several species of white sulfur bacteria in the family Beggiatoaceae can accumulate and transport NO_{3}^{−}, taken from shallow coastal sediments which is fundamental in metabolism, as well as accumulate it in filaments. The reduction of NO_{3}^{−} to ammonium implies the oxidation of H_{2}S (except for geothermal vents, the sulphide derives from the underlying anaerobic sediment in which dissimilatory sulphate reduction occurs): this reduction leads to the formation of suboxic zones characterized by positive redox potential and only trace concentrations of free H_{2}S. In marine environment, the presence of these species is important because they have a fundamental role in regulation of the amount of H_{2}S and NO_{3}^{−} :

- On the one hand, the regulation of free H_{2}S concentration in marine sediments is fundamental because sulfide-depleted surface sediments are essential for survival of benthic infauna, in fact sulfide is highly toxic to bottom fauna and other organisms living in the sediment;
- On the other hand, NO_{3}^{−} reduction is important for the control of eutrophication in nitrogen-limited coastal waters.

Beggiatoa can also accumulate phosphorus as polyphosphate, which it subsequently releases as phosphate under anoxic conditions. This might increase the availability of phosphorus to primary producers if the phosphate is released from the sediment to the water column. Studies on phosphorus cycling and phosphorus release Beggiatoa in Baltic Sea have found that the oxidation of sulfide by these bacteria may decrease the rate of iron sulfide formation in the sediments, and thus increase the phosphorus retention capability of the sediment.

== Cultivation ==
=== Selective Enrichments ===
The most successful enrichments for Beggiatoa spp. have been made using a shallow pan or aquarium to which has been added a few centimeters of sand, differing amounts of CaSO_{4} and K_{2}HPO_{4}, a source of complex organic polymers such as seaweed, several centimeters of sulfide-rich marine mud and seawater. The enrichment must contain the proper sulfide-oxygen interface that can be possible only if air is introduced, for example, by a slow steady flow of freshly aerated seawater. Another type of enrichment associated with Beggiatoa spp. is based on the use of extracted dried grass or hay in a mineral medium because complex polymers such as cellulose residues in the material are a substrate that supports sulfate reduction by other microbes. This also provides the hydrogen sulfide necessary to enrich for Beggiatoa.

=== Pure culture isolation ===
There are three different possible techniques to obtain isolated Beggiatoa strains in pure culture:

- Isolation on agar plates
- Isolation using liquid media
- Isolation and cultivation in gradient media

==== Isolation on agar plates ====
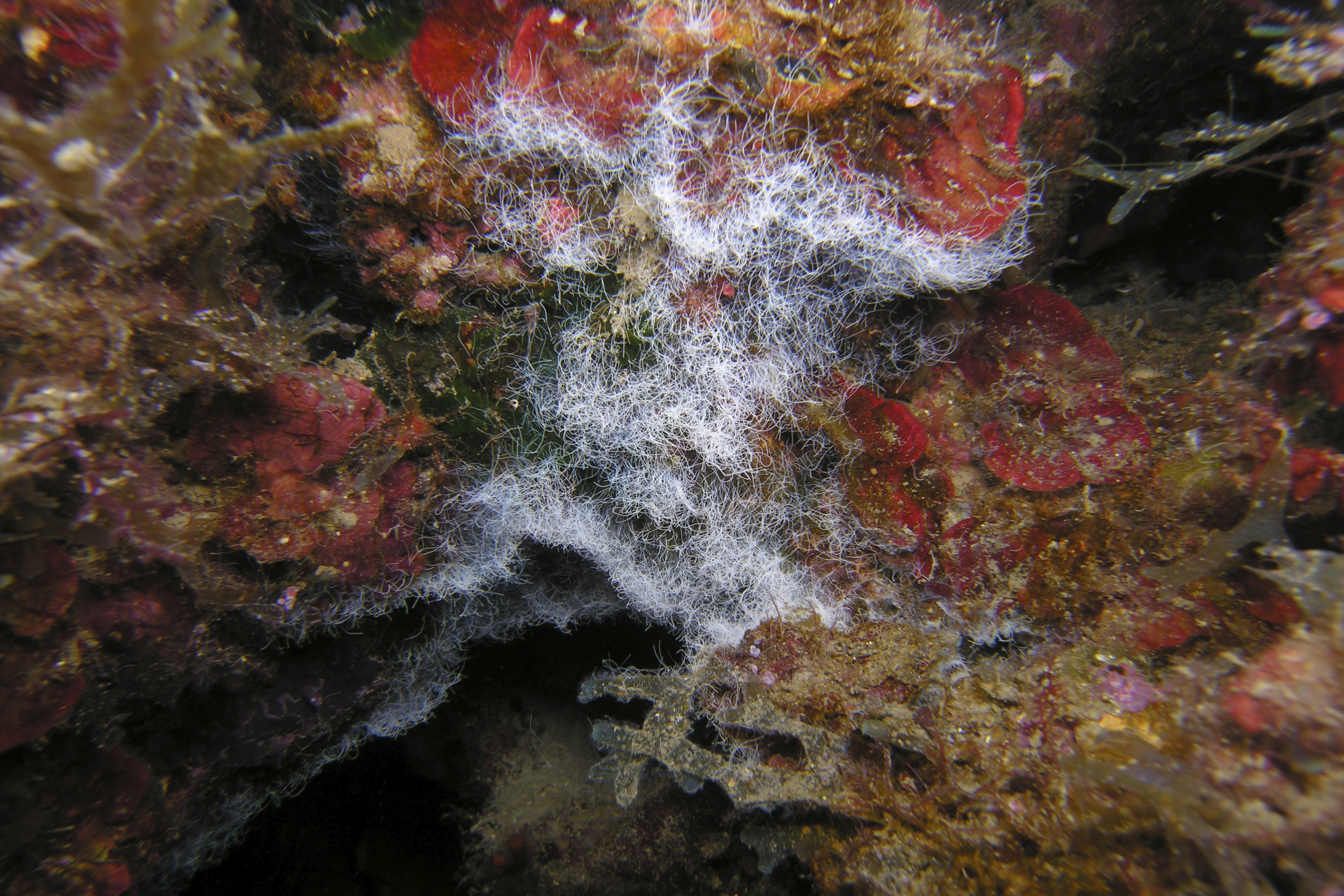
Some Beggiatoa-like filaments near a tiny hole

The procedure to isolate a heterotrophic strain requires an agar plate containing dilute organic substrates such as small amount of peptone. Then, tufts of Beggiatoa filaments are collected from the environment, washed with sterile washing solution and placed on the agar plate. In this way, there will be some growing filaments moving away from the central inoculum that can be used as inoculum for a new agar plate.

For the isolation of marine Beggiatoa strains (that show autotrophic growth), since they are obligate microaerophiles it is essential to provide micro-oxic conditions and to use particular agar plates made with filtered seawater and supplemented with sodium sulfide and sodium acetate. In comparison, for freshwater strains, isolation must be performed under oxic conditions (air atmosphere) using a variety of media containing a low concentration of single organic compound such as acetate, Na_{2}S or thiosulfate.

==== Isolation using liquid media ====
Liquid media are often used for enrichment, most probable number (MPN) enumeration and bulk cultivation of Beggiatoa. To successfully cultivate heterotrophic or mixotrophic freshwater Beggiatoa, liquid media has to contain little amounts of carbon substrate, either soil extracts or acetate. The type species and strain (Beggiatoa alba str. B18LD) and related strains are generally grown in media that include a salt base, acetate as carbon source, and variable yeast extract and sulfide additions. Some marine autotrophic Beggiatoa strains are also been cultured on defined liquid mineral medium with thiosulfate, CO_{2}, and micro-oxic conditions under aeration with 0.25% O_{2} (v/v) in the gas phase.

==== Isolation and cultivation in gradient media ====
Autotrophic strains coming from a single filament isolation on agar can easily be maintained and propagated in sulfide gradient tubes in which sulfide-rich agar plugs are overlaid with sulfide-free soft agar. Tubs are loosely closed in order to permit the exchange of headspace gasses with the atmosphere. As result, two opposite layers are formed, one that contains sulfide while the other one oxygen: this allows the growth of a well-defined Beggiatoa layer at the sulfide-oxygen interface. The gradient medium construction requires different amounts of J3 medium (made by agar and NaHCO_{3}) supplemented with neutralized Na_{2}S placed in a screw-capped tube. Here, the sulfur source is provided by the flux of sulfide. Another "layer" is made by NaHCO_{3} without sulfide or thiosulfate: all of the sulfide will be below the interface between the sulfidic agar plug and the sulfide-free overlay agar while there will be another layer in the top of the tube that represents the oxygen reservoir. It begins to form a gradient shape due to the reaction between sulfide and oxygen: as a result, the filaments rapidly proliferate at the sulfide-oxygen interface, forming a marked layer, or "plate", of 1 mm but it is also possible to appreciate that these bacteria can track the interface and slowly descend owing to the gradual depletion of the sulfide reservoir.
