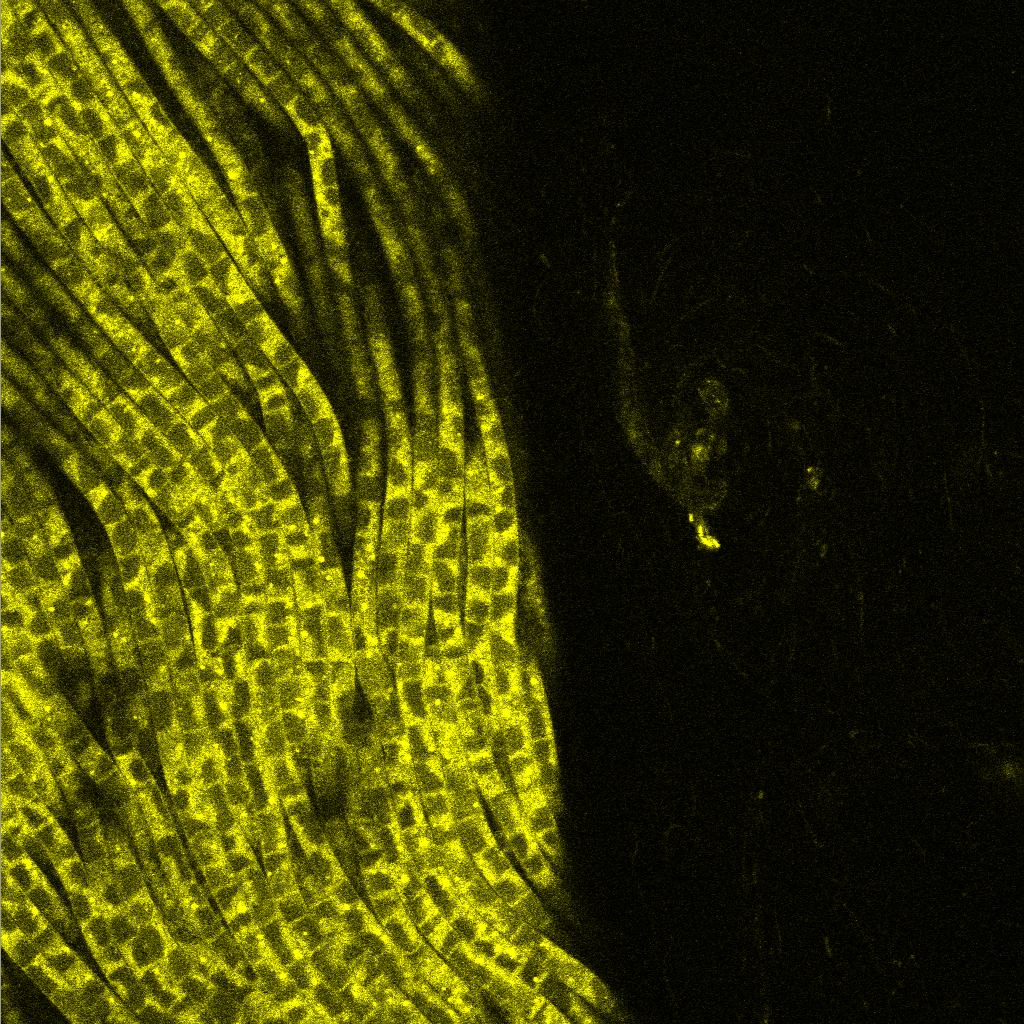

Scientific classification
- Domain: Bacteria
- Kingdom: Pseudomonadati
- Phylum: Pseudomonadota
- Class: Gammaproteobacteria
- Order: Thiotrichales
- Family: Thiotrichaceae
- Genus: Thioploca; Lauterborn 1907

= Thioploca =

Genus of bacteria

Thioploca is a genus of filamentous sulphur-oxidizing bacteria, in the order Thiotrichales (class Gammaproteobacteria). They inhabit both marine and freshwater environments, forming vast communities off the Pacific coast of South America and in other areas with a high organic matter sedimentation and bottom waters rich in nitrate and poor in oxygen. Their cells contain large vacuoles that occupy more than 80% of the cellular volume, used to store nitrate to oxidize sulphur for anaerobic respiration in the absence of oxygen, an important characteristic of the genus. With cell diameters ranging from 15-40 μm, they are some of the largest bacteria known. They provide an important link between the nitrogen and sulphur cycles, because they use both sulfur and nitrogen compounds. They secrete a sheath of mucus which they use as a tunnel to travel between sulphide-containing sediment and nitrate-containing sea water.

== Taxonomy and identification ==
The genus Thioploca was first described by German botanist Robert Lauterborn in 1907, who discovered them in Lake Constance, Germany. Four species of Thioploca have been validly published (as of 2024): two freshwater species (Thioploca ingrica and Thioploca schmidlei) and two marine species (Thioploca araucae and Thioploca chileae).

Thioploca are defined by their filamentous morphology, aggregated into bundles enclosed in a polysaccharide sheath, with either a parallel or braided appearance. These bundles can reach several cm in length, making them easy to recognise. Occasionally they are also found as free-living trichomes, morphologically similar to the genus Beggiatoa. Thioploca are often mistaken for Beggiatoa, which are close phylogenetic relatives with similar metabolic strategies.

The four species are differentiated on the basis of their trichome diameters. The two marine species have diameters up to 43 μm (T. araucae 30-43 μm; T. chileae 12-20 μm), placing them amongst some of the largest prokaryotic structures. The freshwater species T. ingrica and T. schmidlei morphologically resemble the well-characterised marine Thioploca species, but show a smaller trichome diameter. Although some morphological and phylogenetic differences have been found between marine and non-marine species, knowledge about freshwater and brackish Thioploca is still limited, as its ecology is poorly studied so far.

=== Molecular phylogeny ===
Molecular phylogenies based on 16S rRNA sequences place the genera Thioploca and Beggiatoa in a monophyletic, diverse group within Gammaproteobacteria. The genera were initially defined morphologically, Thioploca forms a sheath around their filament bundles, while Beggiatoa does not, which do not necessarily correspond to monophyletic groups in molecular phylogenies. The 16S rRNA data support the fact that T. araucae and T. chileae are two different species. Although the sheaths of Thioploca are phenotypically similar to certain cyanobacteria, such as Microcoleus, the molecular phylogenies show that they are not close relatives but belong to different bacterial phyla.

=== Cultivation ===
The pure, axenic cultivation of Thioploca has so far not been successful. Natural populations can be kept alive for several months near the in-situ temperature of 13°C in anoxic seawater with added nitrate, but their need for a delicate balance of sulphide, nitrate and oxygen concentrations make an enrichment very difficult. Biochemical and physiological studies with harvested Thioploca filaments need to be handled carefully in order to avoid loss of enzymatic activities due to air exposure.

== Metabolism ==
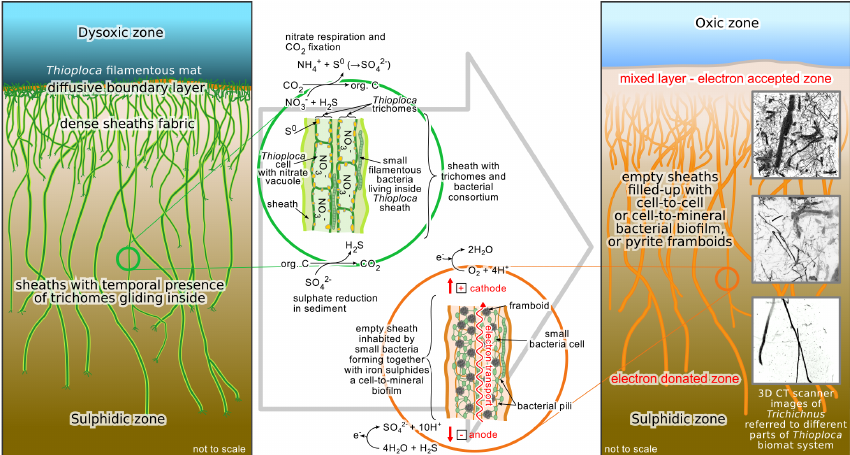
Model of Trichichnus. Showing ecology of Thioploca genus. Sheats of Thioploca may be inhabited by other bacteria capable of construct biofilm which allows the triggers of electric self-potential among sulfidic zone and mixed layer. Thioploca spp. nitrogen, carbon and sulfur metabolism reactions are taken from Teske and Nelson (2006); half-reactions on Trichichnus are adapted from Nielsen and Risgaard-Petersen (2015).

Thioploca are thought to be mixotrophic sulphur oxidizers, although the metabolism is not fully determined because they have not yet been grown in pure culture. Current knowledge is based on experiments on entire communities or bundles of filaments. They are unlikely to be methylotrophs, as previously hypothesized, because they grow in areas that are poor in methane, with concentrations that would not support the metabolic activity of the large Thioploca populations observed. Radioisotope tracer experiments with carbon-14 showed that they do not incorporate methane or methanol, but can incorporate labeled CO_{2} and other organic substrates (acetate, amino acids, bicarbonate, glucose, glycine, etc), hence are an example of mixotrophic bacteria.

As sulphur-oxidizing bacteria, they oxidize mainly H_{2}S (hydrogen sulphide, etc.) and accumulate NO_{3} (nitrate) in a specific vacuole in their cells. In the vacuole the concentrations of nitrate can increase up to 0.5 M. They have also shown the capacity to accumulate S_{0} (elemental sulphur) in the cells as globules, as a result of oxidation of hydrogen sulphide. These bacteria have developed this system (with morphological, physiological, and metabolic adaptation) to maintain a metabolism based on a different source of electron donor and acceptor, which are situated in a different zone in the water column and characterized by a different gradient.

=== Oxygen uptake and resistance ===
Members of this genus are typical microaerophilic microorganisms in terms of their behavior and oxygen uptake rates (1760 μmol dm^{−3} h^{−1}). Although their oxygen uptake rate is similar to Thiomargarita spp., they are less resistant to higher oxygen concentrations, hence they mostly populate oxygen minimum zones (OMZs).

=== Sulphur metabolism ===
Thioploca spp. has shown two types of response to sulphide based on its concentrations of it. They have a positive response to low sulphide (<100 μM) concentrations and negative to high concentrations. They show a maximum uptake rate at 200 μM. This coupled with taxis towards nitrate, regulates the behavior of this genus. Also involved in it is the gradient of O_{2} affecting it in a minor way. For this reason, these microorganisms are defined as microaerophilic. Hypothetically they could be in competition with other sulphide oxidizing bacteria, but with the ability to accumulate nitrate they create a perfect strategy to access both electron donor and acceptor at the same moment.

Based on some research, we know that oxidized iron is important in process of scavenging H_{2}S (hydrogen sulphide), although the precise mechanism is unknown. At the same time, the inhabited sheaths of Thioploca can be covered by filamentous sulphate-reducing bacteria. These sulphate-reducing bacteria, pertaining to the genus Desulfonema, could explain the high rate of recycling of H_{2}S and its availability also in sulphide-pore environments.

Furthermore, the elemental sulphur accumulated in the cells as drops is involved in sulphur metabolism. This reaction is also involved oxygen which oxidates the elemental sulphur:

2S_{0}+3O_{2}+ 2H_{2}O → 4SO_{4}^{2-}+ 4H^{+}

Another reaction, involving nitrate, is part of the oxidation:

4S_{0}+3NO_{3}^{−}+ 7H_{2}O → 4SO_{4}^{2-}+ 3NH_{4}^{+}+2H^{+}

These two reactions occur at similar rates. A difference is situated in the uptake rate of sulphide that is 5-6 times faster with respect to the oxidation rate of elemental sulphur stored in the drops. Based on this we know that sulphide uptake is not coupled with carbon fixation.

=== Nitrogen metabolism ===
Thioploca genus can accumulate nitrate and use it in the dissimilatory nitrate reduction to ammonium (DNRA) pathway. To obtain nitrate they perform a vertical migration. Sheaths of Thioploca spp. are considered a compatible niche for the growth of anammox bacteria, due to the ability of Thioploca spp. to perform DNRA. They can also perform nitrite reduction and show positive taxis towards nitrite. The dissimilatory nitrate reduction is involved also in the oxidation of sulphide that leads to a higher accumulation of elemental sulphur. Higher concentrations of nitrate increase the fixation of carbon dioxide (CO_{2}), although Thioploca filaments can take up nitrate at relatively low (10 μM) environmental concentrations.

== Species ==
Thioploca contains four species:

- Thioploca araucae
- Thioploca chileae
- Thioploca ingrica
- Thioploca schmidlei

== Morphology ==
Thioploca spp. can occur in both marine and freshwater environments, the difference between the two types being in the cell structure since the freshwater species are smaller.

These gram-negative bacteria can be described as flexible, univariate, colorless filaments made up of numerous cells and enclosed by a common gelatinous sheath. Their cell shape can vary in relation to the organism size. In small-sized organisms the cells are usually disk-shaped, while in bigger ones it is more common to find cylindrical or barrel-shaped cells.

The cells are famous for the presence of sulfur inclusions within the cytoplasm and their arrangement in the structure of the organism is characterized by the presence of separation cross-walls among them. Cells of large marine Thioploca look hollow because of the presence of the vacuole full of stored nitrate.

In marine species, the diameter of the trichome (filament) reaches lengths from 15 to 40 μm to many cm; according to their diameter they can be divided into different species. Nevertheless, only two are considered valid today: the 12-20 μm wide Thioploca Chileae and the 30-43 μm wide Thioploca araucae.

Thioploca typically grow in bundles surrounded by a common sheath and the number of filaments for sheath varies from a rage of ten to hundred. This sheath changes its shape during the growth. In young organisms it is thin and tough, while in adults it becomes wide and loose.

Each filament consists of a single row of cylindrical or barrel-shaped cells separated by a septum. In the latter ones, sulfur globules can be found and the cell wall has a complex, four-layered structure, of which the innermost layer and the cytoplasmic membrane go across the septum. Intracytoplasmic membranes and several cell inclusions form complex structures and their work is related to transport and storage.

Thioploca are organisms able to deposit sulfur granules, the most abundant being globules of $S^0$ when sulphide is present. They are located externally of the cytoplasmic membrane, in particular in invaginations of it, and are therefore considered extracytoplasmic. This location has two important consequences:

- the diffusion of sulphide, that may not necessarily diffuse across the membrane to the cytoplasmic side. There it could undergo a disrupt metabolism, avoiding the toxic effects of sulphide ion
- the oxidation of sulphide on the external surface of the cytoplasmic membrane, creating the proton gradient for the synthesis of ATP.

== Habitat ==
The filamentous sulfur oxidizers Thioploca grows at oxic/anoxic interactions on freshwater, brackish and marine sediments where sulfide of biological and geothermal origin combines with oxygen or nitrate in the overlying water column.

Extensive rugs of Thioploca can be found on the Chilean and Peruvian continental shelf, where it grows on sediments that form the basis of deoxygenated water masses of the Peru-Chile countercurrent. Thioploca has been found in coastal regions with analogous upwelling regimes, where high organic productivity creates significant oxygen depletion at the bottom waters that covers organic-rich sediments with high sulfate reduction rates. Examples include the coast of Oman, and the Benguela current ecosystem off Namibia. Other reported marine habitats include the monsoon-driven upwelling area of the northwestern Arabian Sea and hydrothermal vent sites in the eastern Mediterranean Sea.

Classical localities of the freshwater species are lakes in central and northern Europe, but they are also present in large lakes in North America, central Russia, and Japan.

== Ecological niche ==
By transporting nitrate intracellularly deep down into the anoxic seafloor, Thioploca appears to effectively eliminate the competition from other sulfide oxidizing bacteria, which are unable to store an electron acceptor for extended periods but need simultaneous access to both electron acceptor and donor in their immediate microenvironment. A similar storage of oxygen in the vacuoles would not be possible since the lipid membranes enclosing cells and vacuoles are permeable to gases. The thioplocas thus move up and down, recharging with nitrate at the surface and oxidizing sulfide at depth, therefore storing elemental sulfur globules as an energy reserve.

== Thioploca and Beggiatoa ==
Although the thioplocas typically live in sheaths in bundles ranging from a few up to a hundred filaments per sheath, many were found at the sediment surface apparently without a sheath. At the Bay of Concepcion on the Chilean coast, there was a transition between an apparently pure Beggiatoa community inside the bay to a mixed community of both genera at the entrance of the bay to pure Thioploca outside. In the mixed community it was not possible to discriminate beggiatoas from thioplocas by simple microscopy but only by analyzing statistically their diameter distributions. The tapered ends of filaments, characteristic of Thioploca but absent in Beggiatoa, was not a consistent character of the thioplocas.

Future changes in classification of Thioploca and Beggiatoa are likely. The range of strains over which the genus designation Beggiatoa is used is overly broad. More importantly, the differentiation between Thioploca and Beggiatoa is currently based on the formation of a common sheath surrounding filament bundles, a characteristic that might vary in response to environmental conditions. In the absence of pure cultures, it may be impossible to prove or disprove whether any natural population of vacuolated Beggiatoa will form sheath bundles in some specific environment. The clade comprised three Thioploca strains, two Beggiatoa strains, and a Thiomargarita strain is united by the possession of a large central vacuole. This feature currently appears to be the best morphological candidate to replace sheath formation as a marker in a revised taxonomy of the group Beggiatoa–Thioploca. This marker, in addition to being consistent with 16S rRNA phylogeny, appears to be universally connected to intracellular nitrate accumulation, presumably in the vacuole, for nitrate respiration enabling sustained anaerobic metabolism. A future revision of the genus Thioploca, based on the vacuolated, nitrate-respiring phenotype and corresponding 16S rRNA clade, might include these gliding filaments regardless of whether they occur in sheathed bundles.
