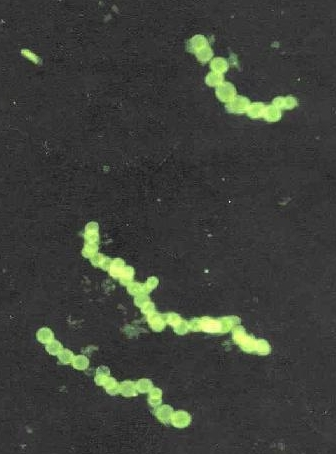
- Stained micrograph of Thiomargarita namibiensis

Scientific classification
- Domain: Bacteria
- Kingdom: Pseudomonadati
- Phylum: Pseudomonadota
- Class: Gammaproteobacteria
- Order: Thiotrichales
- Family: Thiotrichaceae
- Genus: Thiomargarita; Schulz et al. 1999

Species
- Thiomargarita namibiensis; Ca. Thiomargarita nelsonii; Ca. Thiomargarita joergensenii; Ca. Thiomargarita magnifica

= Thiomargarita =

Genus of bacteria

Thiomargarita is a genus (family Thiotrichaceae) which includes the vacuolate sulfur bacteria species Thiomargarita namibiensis, Candidatus Thiomargarita nelsonii, and Ca. Thiomargarita joergensenii. In 2022, scientists working in a Caribbean mangrove discovered an extremely large member of the genus, provisionally named Ca. T. magnifica, whose cells are easily visible to the naked eye at up to 2 centimetres (0.79 in) long.

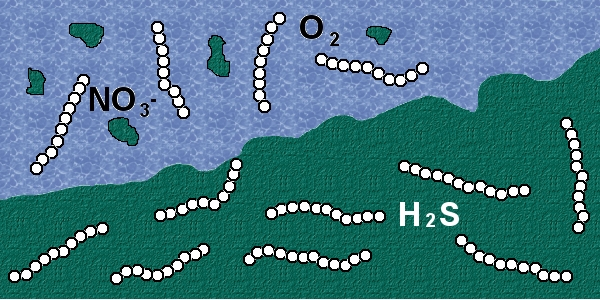
Thiomargarita namibiensis, collecting nitrate and oxygen in water above the bottom in case of being resuspended and collecting sulfide in the sediments

Representatives of this genus can be found in a variety of environments that are rich in hydrogen sulfide, including methane seeps, mud volcanoes, brine pools, and organic-rich sediments such as those found beneath the Benguela Current and Humboldt Current. These bacteria are generally considered to be chemolithotrophs that utilize reduced inorganic species of sulfur as metabolic electron donors to produce energy for the fixation of carbon into biomass. Carbon fixation occurs via the Calvin Benson Bassham cycle and possibly the reverse Krebs cycle.
