= Thiotrichaceae =

Scientific classification
- Domain: Bacteria
- Kingdom: Pseudomonadati
- Phylum: Pseudomonadota
- Class: Gammaproteobacteria
- Order: Thiotrichales
- Family: Thiotrichaceae; Garrity et al. 2005

Genera
- Achromatium; Beggiatoa; Leucothrix; Thiobacterium "Candidatus Thiolava"; Thiomargarita; Thioploca; Thiospira; Thiothrix

Family of bacteria

The Thiotrichaceae are a family of Pseudomonadota, including Thiomargarita namibiensis, the largest known bacterium. Some species move by gliding, Thiospira by using flagella.
