= Microbial metabolism =

Biochemical pathways used by microbes to satisfy energy needs

Microbial metabolism is the means by which a microbe obtains the energy and nutrients (e.g. carbon) it needs to live and reproduce. Microbes use many different types of metabolic strategies and species can often be differentiated from each other based on metabolic characteristics. The specific metabolic properties of a microbe are the major factors in determining that microbe's ecological niche, and often allow for that microbe to be useful in industrial processes or responsible for biogeochemical cycles.

== Types ==
Flow chart to determine the metabolic characteristics of microorganisms

All microbial metabolisms can be arranged according to three principles:

1. How the organism obtains carbon for synthesizing cell mass:

- autotrophic – carbon is obtained from carbon dioxide (CO_{2})
- heterotrophic – carbon is obtained from organic compounds
- mixotrophic – carbon is obtained from both organic compounds and by fixing carbon dioxide

2. How the organism obtains reducing equivalents (hydrogen atoms or electrons) used either in energy conservation or in biosynthetic reactions:

- lithotrophic – reducing equivalents are obtained from inorganic compounds
- organotrophic – reducing equivalents are obtained from organic compounds

3. How the organism obtains energy for living and growing:

- phototrophic – energy is obtained from light
- chemotrophic – energy is obtained from external chemical compounds

In practice, these terms are almost freely combined. Typical examples are as follows:

- chemolithoautotrophs obtain energy from the oxidation of inorganic compounds and carbon from the fixation of carbon dioxide. Examples: Nitrifying bacteria, sulfur-oxidizing bacteria, iron-oxidizing bacteria, Knallgas-bacteria
- photolithoautotrophs obtain energy from light and carbon from the fixation of carbon dioxide, using reducing equivalents from inorganic compounds. Examples: Cyanobacteria (water (H_{2}O) as reducing equivalent = hydrogen donor), Chlorobiaceae, Chromatiaceae (hydrogen sulfide (H_{2}S) as hydrogen donor), Chloroflexus (hydrogen (H_{2}) as reducing equivalent donor)
- chemolithoheterotrophs obtain energy from the oxidation of inorganic compounds, but cannot fix carbon dioxide (CO_{2}). Examples: some Thiobacilus, some Beggiatoa, some Nitrobacter spp., Wolinella (with H_{2} as reducing equivalent donor), some Knallgas-bacteria, some sulfate-reducing bacteria
- chemoorganoheterotrophs obtain energy, carbon, and hydrogen for biosynthetic reactions from organic compounds. Examples: most bacteria, e. g. Escherichia coli, Bacillus spp., Actinomycetota; eukaryotes
- photoorganoheterotrophs obtain energy from light, carbon and reducing equivalents for biosynthetic reactions from organic compounds. Some species are strictly heterotrophic, many others can also fix carbon dioxide and are mixotrophic. Examples: Rhodobacter, Rhodopseudomonas, Rhodospirillum, Rhodomicrobium, Rhodocyclus, Heliobacterium, Chloroflexus (alternatively to photolithoautotrophy with hydrogen)

== Heterotrophic microbial metabolism ==
Some microbes are heterotrophic (more precisely chemoorganoheterotrophic), using organic compounds as both carbon and energy sources. Heterotrophic microbes live off of nutrients that they scavenge from living hosts (as commensals or parasites) or find in dead organic matter of all kind (saprophages). Microbial metabolism is the main contribution for the bodily decay of all organisms after death. Many eukaryotic microorganisms are heterotrophic by predation or parasitism, properties also found in some bacteria such as Bdellovibrio (an intracellular parasite of other bacteria, causing death of its victims) and Myxobacteria such as Myxococcus (predators of other bacteria which are killed and used by cooperating swarms of many single cells of Myxobacteria). Most pathogenic bacteria can be viewed as heterotrophic parasites of humans or the other eukaryotic species they affect. Heterotrophic microbes are extremely abundant in nature and are responsible for the breakdown of large organic polymers such as cellulose, chitin or lignin which are generally indigestible to larger animals. Generally, the oxidative breakdown of large polymers to carbon dioxide (mineralization) requires several different organisms, with one breaking down the polymer into its constituent monomers, one able to use the monomers and excreting simpler waste compounds as by-products, and one able to use the excreted wastes. There are many variations on this theme, as different organisms are able to degrade different polymers and secrete different waste products. Some organisms are even able to degrade more recalcitrant compounds such as petroleum compounds or pesticides, making them useful in bioremediation.

Biochemically, prokaryotic heterotrophic metabolism is much more versatile than that of eukaryotic organisms, although many prokaryotes share the most basic metabolic models with eukaryotes, e. g. using glycolysis (also called EMP pathway) for sugar metabolism and the citric acid cycle to degrade acetate, producing energy in the form of ATP and reducing power in the form of NADH or quinols. These basic pathways are well conserved because they are also involved in biosynthesis of many conserved building blocks needed for cell growth (sometimes in reverse direction). However, many bacteria and archaea utilize alternative metabolic pathways other than glycolysis and the citric acid cycle. A well-studied example is sugar metabolism via the keto-deoxy-phosphogluconate pathway (also called ED pathway) in Pseudomonas. Moreover, there is a third alternative sugar-catabolic pathway used by some bacteria, the pentose phosphate pathway. The metabolic diversity and ability of prokaryotes to use a large variety of organic compounds arises from the much deeper evolutionary history and diversity of prokaryotes, as compared to eukaryotes. It is also noteworthy that the mitochondrion, the small membrane-bound intracellular organelle that is the site of eukaryotic oxygen-using energy metabolism, arose from the endosymbiosis of a bacterium related to obligate intracellular Rickettsia, and also to plant-associated Rhizobium or Agrobacterium. Therefore, it is not surprising that all mitrochondriate eukaryotes share metabolic properties with these Pseudomonadota. Most microbes respire (use an electron transport chain), although oxygen is not the only terminal electron acceptor that may be used. As discussed below, the use of terminal electron acceptors other than oxygen has important biogeochemical consequences.

== Fermentation ==
Fermentation is a specific type of heterotrophic metabolism that uses organic carbon instead of oxygen as a terminal electron acceptor. This means that these organisms do not use an electron transport chain to oxidize NADH to NAD^{+} and therefore must have an alternative method of using this reducing power and maintaining a supply of NAD^{+} for the proper functioning of normal metabolic pathways (e.g. glycolysis). As oxygen is not required, fermentative organisms are anaerobic. Many organisms can use fermentation under anaerobic conditions and aerobic respiration when oxygen is present. These organisms are facultative anaerobes. To avoid the overproduction of NADH, obligately fermentative organisms usually do not have a complete citric acid cycle. Instead of using an ATP synthase as in respiration, ATP in fermentative organisms is produced by substrate-level phosphorylation where a phosphate group is transferred from a high-energy organic compound to ADP to form ATP. As a result of the need to produce high energy phosphate-containing organic compounds (generally in the form of Coenzyme A-esters) fermentative organisms use NADH and other cofactors to produce many different reduced metabolic by-products, often including hydrogen gas (H_{2}). These reduced organic compounds are generally small organic acids and alcohols derived from pyruvate, the end product of glycolysis. Examples include ethanol, acetate, lactate, and butyrate. Fermentative organisms are very important industrially and are used to make many different types of food products. The different metabolic end products produced by each specific bacterial species are responsible for the different tastes and properties of each food.

Not all fermentative organisms use substrate-level phosphorylation. Instead, some organisms are able to couple the oxidation of low-energy organic compounds directly to the formation of a proton motive force or sodium-motive force and therefore ATP synthesis. Examples of these unusual forms of fermentation include succinate fermentation by Propionigenium modestum and oxalate fermentation by Oxalobacter formigenes. These reactions are extremely low-energy yielding. Humans and other higher animals also use fermentation to produce lactate from excess NADH, although this is not the major form of metabolism as it is in fermentative microorganisms.

== Special metabolic properties ==
=== Methylotrophy ===
Methylotrophy refers to the ability of an organism to use C1-compounds as energy sources. These compounds include methanol, methyl amines, formaldehyde, and formate. Several other less common substrates may also be used for metabolism, all of which lack carbon-carbon bonds. Examples of methylotrophs include the bacteria Methylomonas and Methylobacter. Methanotrophs are a specific type of methylotroph that are also able to use methane (CH_{4}) as a carbon source by oxidizing it sequentially to methanol (CH_{3}OH), formaldehyde (CH_{2}O), formate (HCOO^{−}), and carbon dioxide CO_{2} initially using the enzyme methane monooxygenase. As oxygen is required for this process, all (conventional) methanotrophs are obligate aerobes. Reducing power in the form of quinones and NADH is produced during these oxidations to produce a proton motive force and therefore ATP generation. Methylotrophs and methanotrophs are not considered as autotrophic, because they are able to incorporate some of the oxidized methane (or other metabolites) into cellular carbon before it is completely oxidized to CO_{2} (at the level of formaldehyde), using either the serine pathway (Methylosinus, Methylocystis) or the ribulose monophosphate pathway (Methylococcus), depending on the species of methylotroph.

In addition to aerobic methylotrophy, methane can also be oxidized anaerobically. This occurs by a consortium of sulfate-reducing bacteria and relatives of methanogenic Archaea working syntrophically (see below). Little is currently known about the biochemistry and ecology of this process.

Methanogenesis is the biological production of methane. It is carried out by methanogens, strictly anaerobic Archaea such as Methanococcus, Methanocaldococcus, Methanobacterium, Methanothermus, Methanosarcina, Methanosaeta and Methanopyrus. The biochemistry of methanogenesis is unique in nature in its use of a number of unusual cofactors to sequentially reduce methanogenic substrates to methane, such as coenzyme M and methanofuran. These cofactors are responsible (among other things) for the establishment of a proton gradient across the outer membrane thereby driving ATP synthesis. Several types of methanogenesis occur, differing in the starting compounds oxidized. Some methanogens reduce carbon dioxide (CO_{2}) to methane (CH_{4}) using electrons (most often) from hydrogen gas (H_{2}) chemolithoautotrophically. These methanogens can often be found in environments containing fermentative organisms. The tight association of methanogens and fermentative bacteria can be considered to be syntrophic (see below) because the methanogens, which rely on the fermentors for hydrogen, relieve feedback inhibition of the fermentors by the build-up of excess hydrogen that would otherwise inhibit their growth. This type of syntrophic relationship is specifically known as interspecies hydrogen transfer. A second group of methanogens use methanol (CH_{3}OH) as a substrate for methanogenesis. These are chemoorganotrophic, but still autotrophic in using CO_{2} as only carbon source. The biochemistry of this process is quite different from that of the carbon dioxide-reducing methanogens. Lastly, a third group of methanogens produce both methane and carbon dioxide from acetate (CH_{3}COO^{−}) with the acetate being split between the two carbons. These acetate-cleaving organisms are the only chemoorganoheterotrophic methanogens. All autotrophic methanogens use a variation of the reductive acetyl-CoA pathway to fix CO_{2} and obtain cellular carbon.

=== Syntrophy ===
Syntrophy, in the context of microbial metabolism, refers to the pairing of multiple species to achieve a chemical reaction that, on its own, would be energetically unfavorable. The best studied example of this process is the oxidation of fermentative end products (such as acetate, ethanol and butyrate) by organisms such as Syntrophomonas. Alone, the oxidation of butyrate to acetate and hydrogen gas is energetically unfavorable. However, when a hydrogenotrophic (hydrogen-using) methanogen is present the use of the hydrogen gas will significantly lower the concentration of hydrogen (down to 10^{−5} atm) and thereby shift the equilibrium of the butyrate oxidation reaction under standard conditions (ΔGº') to non-standard conditions (ΔG'). Because the concentration of one product is lowered, the reaction is "pulled" towards the products and shifted towards net energetically favorable conditions (for butyrate oxidation: ΔGº'= +48.2 kJ/mol, but ΔG' = -8.9 kJ/mol at 10^{−5} atm hydrogen and even lower if also the initially produced acetate is further metabolized by methanogens). Conversely, the available free energy from methanogenesis is lowered from ΔGº'= -131 kJ/mol under standard conditions to ΔG' = -17 kJ/mol at 10^{−5} atm hydrogen. This is an example of intraspecies hydrogen transfer. In this way, low energy-yielding carbon sources can be used by a consortium of organisms to achieve further degradation and eventual mineralization of these compounds. These reactions help prevent the excess sequestration of carbon over geologic time scales, releasing it back to the biosphere in usable forms such as methane and CO_{2}.

== Aerobic respiration ==
Aerobic metabolism occurs in Bacteria, Archaea and Eucarya. Although most bacterial species are anaerobic, many are facultative or obligate aerobes. The majority of archaeal species live in extreme environments that are often highly anaerobic. There are, however, several cases of aerobic archaea such as Halobacterium, Thermoplasma, Sulfolobus and Yymbaculum. Most of the known eukaryotes carry out aerobic metabolism within their mitochondria which is an organelle that had a symbiogenesis origin from prokarya . All aerobic organisms contain oxidases of the cytochrome oxidase super family, but some members of the Pseudomonadota (E. coli and Acetobacter) can also use an unrelated cytochrome bd complex as a respiratory terminal oxidase.

== Anaerobic respiration ==
While aerobic organisms during respiration use oxygen as a terminal electron acceptor, anaerobic organisms use other electron acceptors. These inorganic compounds release less energy in cellular respiration, which leads to slower growth rates than aerobes. Many facultative anaerobes can use either oxygen or alternative terminal electron acceptors for respiration depending on the environmental conditions.

Most respiring anaerobes are heterotrophs, although some do live autotrophically. All of the processes described below are dissimilative, meaning that they do not incorporate the resulting by-product into the cell biomass (assimilative). Assimilative pathways for many forms of anaerobic respiration are also known.

=== Denitrification – nitrate as electron acceptor ===
Denitrification is the utilization of nitrate (NO^{−}_{3}) as a terminal electron acceptor. It is a widespread process that is used by many members of the Pseudomonadota. Many facultative anaerobes use denitrification because nitrate, like oxygen, has a high reduction potential. Many denitrifying bacteria can also use ferric iron (Fe^{3+}) and some organic electron acceptors. Denitrification involves the stepwise reduction of nitrate to nitrite (NO^{−}_{2}), nitric oxide (NO), nitrous oxide (N_{2}O), and dinitrogen (N_{2}) by the enzymes nitrate reductase, nitrite reductase, nitric oxide reductase, and nitrous oxide reductase, respectively. Protons are transported across the membrane by the initial NADH reductase, quinones, and nitrous oxide reductase to produce the electrochemical gradient critical for respiration. Some organisms (e.g. E. coli) only produce nitrate reductase and therefore can accomplish only the first reduction leading to the accumulation of nitrite. Others (e.g. Paracoccus denitrificans or Pseudomonas stutzeri) reduce nitrate completely. Complete denitrification is an environmentally significant process because some intermediates of denitrification (nitric oxide and nitrous oxide) are important greenhouse gases that react with sunlight and ozone to produce nitric acid, a component of acid rain. Denitrification is also important in biological wastewater treatment where it is used to reduce the amount of nitrogen released into the environment thereby reducing eutrophication. Denitrification can be determined via a nitrate reductase test.

=== Sulfate reduction – sulfate as electron acceptor ===
Dissimilatory sulfate reduction is a relatively energetically poor process used by many Gram-negative bacteria found within the Thermodesulfobacteriota, Gram-positive organisms relating to Desulfotomaculum or the archaeon Archaeoglobus. Hydrogen sulfide (H_{2}S) is produced as a metabolic end product. For sulfate reduction electron donors and energy are needed.

==== Electron donors ====
Many sulfate reducers are organotrophic, using carbon compounds such as lactate and pyruvate (among many others) as electron donors, while others are lithotrophic, using hydrogen gas (H_{2}) as an electron donor. Some unusual autotrophic sulfate-reducing bacteria (e.g. Desulfotignum phosphitoxidans) can use phosphite (HPO^{−}_{3}) as an electron donor whereas others (e.g. Desulfovibrio sulfodismutans, Desulfocapsa thiozymogenes, Desulfocapsa sulfoexigens) are capable of sulfur disproportionation (splitting one compound into two different compounds, in this case an electron donor and an electron acceptor) using elemental sulfur (S^{0}), sulfite (SO^{2−}_{3}), and thiosulfate (S_{2}O^{2−}_{3}) to produce both hydrogen sulfide (H_{2}S) and sulfate (SO^{2−}_{4}).

==== Energy for reduction ====
All sulfate-reducing organisms are strict anaerobes. Because sulfate is energetically stable, before it can be metabolized it must first be activated by adenylation to form APS (adenosine 5'-phosphosulfate) thereby consuming ATP. The APS is then reduced by the enzyme APS reductase to form sulfite (SO^{2−}_{3}) and AMP. In organisms that use carbon compounds as electron donors, the ATP consumed is accounted for by fermentation of the carbon substrate. The hydrogen produced during fermentation is actually what drives respiration during sulfate reduction.

=== Acetogenesis – carbon dioxide as electron acceptor ===
Acetogenesis is a type of microbial metabolism that uses hydrogen (H_{2}) as an electron donor and carbon dioxide (CO_{2}) as an electron acceptor to produce acetate, the same electron donors and acceptors used in methanogenesis (see above). Bacteria that can autotrophically synthesize acetate are called homoacetogens. Carbon dioxide reduction in all homoacetogens occurs by the acetyl-CoA pathway. This pathway is also used for carbon fixation by autotrophic sulfate-reducing bacteria and hydrogenotrophic methanogens. Often homoacetogens can also be fermentative, using the hydrogen and carbon dioxide produced as a result of fermentation to produce acetate, which is secreted as an end product.

=== Other inorganic electron acceptors ===
Ferric iron (Fe^{3+}) is a widespread anaerobic terminal electron acceptor both for autotrophic and heterotrophic organisms. Electron flow in these organisms is similar to those in electron transport, ending in oxygen or nitrate, except that in ferric iron-reducing organisms the final enzyme in this system is a ferric iron reductase. Model organisms include Shewanella putrefaciens and Geobacter metallireducens. Since some ferric iron-reducing bacteria (e.g. G. metallireducens) can use toxic hydrocarbons such as toluene as a carbon source, there is significant interest in using these organisms as bioremediation agents in ferric iron-rich contaminated aquifers.

Although ferric iron is the most prevalent inorganic electron acceptor, a number of organisms (including the iron-reducing bacteria mentioned above) can use other inorganic ions in anaerobic respiration. While these processes may often be less significant ecologically, they are of considerable interest for bioremediation, especially when heavy metals or radionuclides are used as electron acceptors. Examples include:

- Manganic ion (Mn^{4+}) reduction to manganous ion (Mn^{2+})
- Selenate (SeO^{2−}_{4}) reduction to selenite (SeO^{2−}_{3}) and selenite reduction to inorganic selenium (Se^{0})
- Arsenate (AsO^{3−}_{4}) reduction to arsenite (AsO^{3−}_{3})
- Uranyl ion (UO^{2+}_{2}) reduction to uranium dioxide (UO_{2})

=== Organic terminal electron acceptors ===
A number of organisms, instead of using inorganic compounds as terminal electron acceptors, are able to use organic compounds to accept electrons from respiration. Examples include:

- Fumarate reduction to succinate
- Trimethylamine N-oxide (TMAO) reduction to trimethylamine (TMA)
- Dimethyl sulfoxide (DMSO) reduction to dimethyl sulfide (DMS)
- Reductive dechlorination

TMAO is a chemical commonly produced by fish, and when reduced to TMA produces a strong odor. DMSO is a common marine and freshwater chemical which is also odiferous when reduced to DMS. Reductive dechlorination is the process by which chlorinated organic compounds are reduced to form their non-chlorinated endproducts. As chlorinated organic compounds are often important (and difficult to degrade) environmental pollutants, reductive dechlorination is an important process in bioremediation.

== Chemolithotrophy ==
Chemolithotrophy is a type of metabolism where energy is obtained from the oxidation of inorganic compounds. Most chemolithotrophic organisms are also autotrophic. There are two major objectives to chemolithotrophy: the generation of energy (ATP) and the generation of reducing power (NADH).

=== Hydrogen oxidation ===
Many organisms are capable of using hydrogen (H_{2}) as a source of energy. While several mechanisms of anaerobic hydrogen oxidation have been mentioned previously (e.g. sulfate reducing- and acetogenic bacteria), the chemical energy of hydrogen can be used in the aerobic Knallgas reaction:

2 H_{2} + O_{2} → 2 H_{2}O + energy

In these organisms, hydrogen is oxidized by a membrane-bound hydrogenase causing proton pumping via electron transfer to various quinones and cytochromes. In many organisms, a second cytoplasmic hydrogenase is used to generate reducing power in the form of NADH, which is subsequently used to fix carbon dioxide via the Calvin cycle. Hydrogen-oxidizing organisms, such as Cupriavidus necator (formerly Ralstonia eutropha), often inhabit oxic-anoxic interfaces in nature to take advantage of the hydrogen produced by anaerobic fermentative organisms while still maintaining a supply of oxygen.

=== Sulfur oxidation ===
Sulfur oxidation involves the oxidation of reduced sulfur compounds (such as sulfide H_{2}S), inorganic sulfur (S), and thiosulfate (S_{2}O^{2−}_{3}) to form sulfuric acid (H_{2}SO_{4}). A classic example of a sulfur-oxidizing bacterium is Beggiatoa, a microbe originally described by Sergei Winogradsky, one of the founders of environmental microbiology. Another example is Paracoccus. Generally, the oxidation of sulfide occurs in stages, with inorganic sulfur being stored either inside or outside of the cell until needed. This two step process occurs because energetically sulfide is a better electron donor than inorganic sulfur or thiosulfate, allowing for a greater number of protons to be translocated across the membrane. Sulfur-oxidizing organisms generate reducing power for carbon dioxide fixation via the Calvin cycle using reverse electron flow, an energy-requiring process that pushes the electrons against their thermodynamic gradient to produce NADH. Biochemically, reduced sulfur compounds are converted to sulfite (SO^{2−}_{3}) and subsequently converted to sulfate (SO^{2−}_{4}) by the enzyme sulfite oxidase. Some organisms, however, accomplish the same oxidation using a reversal of the APS reductase system used by sulfate-reducing bacteria (see above). In all cases the energy liberated is transferred to the electron transport chain for ATP and NADH production. In addition to aerobic sulfur oxidation, some organisms (e.g. Thiobacillus denitrificans) use nitrate (NO^{−}_{3}) as a terminal electron acceptor and therefore grow anaerobically.

=== Ferrous iron (Fe^{2+}) oxidation ===
Ferrous iron is a soluble form of iron that is stable at extremely low pHs or under anaerobic conditions. Under aerobic, moderate pH conditions ferrous iron is oxidized spontaneously to the ferric (Fe^{3+}) form and is hydrolyzed abiotically to insoluble ferric hydroxide (Fe(OH)_{3}). There are three distinct types of ferrous iron-oxidizing microbes. The first are acidophiles, such as the bacteria Acidithiobacillus ferrooxidans and Leptospirillum ferrooxidans, as well as the archaeon Ferroplasma. These microbes oxidize iron in environments that have a very low pH and are important in acid mine drainage. The second type of microbes oxidize ferrous iron at near-neutral pH. These micro-organisms (for example Gallionella ferruginea, Leptothrix ochracea, or Mariprofundus ferrooxydans) live at the oxic-anoxic interfaces and are microaerophiles. The third type of iron-oxidizing microbes are anaerobic photosynthetic bacteria such as Rhodopseudomonas, which use ferrous iron to produce NADH for autotrophic carbon dioxide fixation. Biochemically, aerobic iron oxidation is a very energetically poor process which therefore requires large amounts of iron to be oxidized by the enzyme rusticyanin to facilitate the formation of proton motive force. Like sulfur oxidation, reverse electron flow must be used to form the NADH used for carbon dioxide fixation via the Calvin cycle.

=== Nitrification ===
Nitrification is the process by which ammonia (NH_{3}) is converted to nitrate (NO^{−}_{3}). Nitrification is actually the net result of two distinct processes: oxidation of ammonia to nitrite (NO^{−}_{2}) by nitrosifying bacteria (e.g. Nitrosomonas) and oxidation of nitrite to nitrate by the nitrite-oxidizing bacteria (e.g. Nitrobacter). Both of these processes are extremely energetically poor leading to very slow growth rates for both types of organisms. Biochemically, ammonia oxidation occurs by the stepwise oxidation of ammonia to hydroxylamine (NH_{2}OH) by the enzyme ammonia monooxygenase in the cytoplasm, followed by the oxidation of hydroxylamine to nitrite by the enzyme hydroxylamine oxidoreductase in the periplasm.

Electron and proton cycling are very complex but as a net result only one proton is translocated across the membrane per molecule of ammonia oxidized. Nitrite oxidation is much simpler, with nitrite being oxidized by the enzyme nitrite oxidoreductase coupled to proton translocation by a very short electron transport chain, again leading to very low growth rates for these organisms. Oxygen is required in both ammonia and nitrite oxidation, meaning that both nitrosifying and nitrite-oxidizing bacteria are aerobes. As in sulfur and iron oxidation, NADH for carbon dioxide fixation using the Calvin cycle is generated by reverse electron flow, thereby placing a further metabolic burden on an already energy-poor process.

In 2015, two groups independently showed the microbial genus Nitrospira is capable of complete nitrification (Comammox).

=== Anammox ===
Anammox stands for anaerobic ammonia oxidation and the organisms responsible were relatively recently discovered, in the late 1990s. This form of metabolism occurs in members of the Planctomycetota (e.g. "Candidatus Brocadia anammoxidans") and involves the coupling of ammonia oxidation to nitrite reduction. As oxygen is not required for this process, these organisms are strict anaerobes. Hydrazine (N_{2}H_{4} – rocket fuel) is produced as an intermediate during anammox metabolism. To deal with the high toxicity of hydrazine, anammox bacteria contain a hydrazine-containing intracellular organelle called the anammoxasome, surrounded by highly compact (and unusual) ladderane lipid membrane. These lipids are unique in nature, as is the use of hydrazine as a metabolic intermediate. Anammox organisms are autotrophs although the mechanism for carbon dioxide fixation is unclear. Because of this property, these organisms could be used to remove nitrogen in industrial wastewater treatment processes. Anammox has also been shown to have widespread occurrence in anaerobic aquatic systems and has been speculated to account for approximately 50% of nitrogen gas production in the ocean.

=== Manganese oxidation ===
In July 2020 researchers report the discovery of chemolithoautotrophic bacterial culture that feeds on the metal manganese after performing unrelated experiments and named its bacterial species Candidatus Manganitrophus noduliformans and Ramlibacter lithotrophicus.

== Phototrophy ==
Many microbes (phototrophs) are capable of using light as a source of energy to produce ATP and organic compounds such as carbohydrates, lipids, and proteins. Of these, algae are particularly significant because they are oxygenic, using water as an electron donor for electron transfer during photosynthesis. Phototrophic bacteria are found in the phyla "Cyanobacteria", Chlorobiota, Pseudomonadota, Chloroflexota, and Bacillota. Along with plants these microbes are responsible for all biological generation of oxygen gas on Earth. Because chloroplasts were derived from a lineage of the Cyanobacteria, the general principles of metabolism in these endosymbionts can also be applied to chloroplasts. In addition to oxygenic photosynthesis, many bacteria can also photosynthesize anaerobically, typically using sulfide (H_{2}S) as an electron donor to produce sulfate. Inorganic sulfur (S_{0}), thiosulfate (S_{2}O^{2−}_{3}) and ferrous iron (Fe^{2+}) can also be used by some organisms. Phylogenetically, all oxygenic photosynthetic bacteria are Cyanobacteria, while anoxygenic photosynthetic bacteria belong to the purple bacteria (Pseudomonadota), green sulfur bacteria (e.g., Chlorobium), green non-sulfur bacteria (e.g., Chloroflexus), or the heliobacteria (Low %G+C Gram positives). In addition to these organisms, some microbes (e.g. the Archaeon Halobacterium or the bacterium Roseobacter, among others) can utilize light to produce energy using the enzyme bacteriorhodopsin, a light-driven proton pump. However, there are no known Archaea that carry out photosynthesis.

As befits the large diversity of photosynthetic bacteria, there are many different mechanisms by which light is converted into energy for metabolism. All photosynthetic organisms locate their photosynthetic reaction centers within a membrane, which may be invaginations of the cytoplasmic membrane (Pseudomonadota), thylakoid membranes ("Cyanobacteria"), specialized antenna structures called chlorosomes (Green sulfur and non-sulfur bacteria), or the cytoplasmic membrane itself (heliobacteria). Different photosynthetic bacteria also contain different photosynthetic pigments, such as chlorophylls and carotenoids, allowing them to take advantage of different portions of the electromagnetic spectrum and thereby inhabit different niches. Some groups of organisms contain more specialized light-harvesting structures (e.g. phycobilisomes in Cyanobacteria and chlorosomes in Green sulfur and non-sulfur bacteria), allowing for increased efficiency in light utilization.

Biochemically, anoxygenic photosynthesis is very different from oxygenic photosynthesis. Cyanobacteria (and by extension, chloroplasts) use the Z scheme of electron flow in which electrons eventually are used to form NADH. Two different reaction centers (photosystems) are used and proton motive force is generated both by using cyclic electron flow and the quinone pool. In anoxygenic photosynthetic bacteria, electron flow is cyclic, with all electrons used in photosynthesis eventually being transferred back to the single reaction center. A proton motive force is generated using only the quinone pool. In heliobacteria, Green sulfur, and Green non-sulfur bacteria, NADH is formed using the protein ferredoxin, an energetically favorable reaction. In purple bacteria, NADH is formed by reverse electron flow due to the lower chemical potential of this reaction center. In all cases, however, a proton motive force is generated and used to drive ATP production via an ATPase.

Most photosynthetic microbes are autotrophic, fixing carbon dioxide via the Calvin cycle. Some photosynthetic bacteria (e.g. Chloroflexus) are photoheterotrophs, meaning that they use organic carbon compounds as a carbon source for growth. Some photosynthetic organisms also fix nitrogen (see below).

== Nitrogen fixation ==
Nitrogen is an element required for growth by all biological systems. While extremely common (80% by volume) in the atmosphere, dinitrogen gas (N_{2}) is generally biologically inaccessible due to its high activation energy. Throughout all of nature, only specialized bacteria and Archaea are capable of nitrogen fixation, converting dinitrogen gas into ammonia (NH_{3}), which is easily assimilated by all organisms. These prokaryotes, therefore, are very important ecologically and are often essential for the survival of entire ecosystems. This is especially true in the ocean, where nitrogen-fixing cyanobacteria are often the only sources of fixed nitrogen, and in soils, where specialized symbioses exist between legumes and their nitrogen-fixing partners to provide the nitrogen needed by these plants for growth.

Nitrogen fixation can be found distributed throughout nearly all bacterial lineages and physiological classes but is not a universal property. Because the enzyme nitrogenase, responsible for nitrogen fixation, is very sensitive to oxygen which will inhibit it irreversibly, all nitrogen-fixing organisms must possess some mechanism to keep the concentration of oxygen low. Examples include:

- heterocyst formation (cyanobacteria e.g. Anabaena) where one cell does not photosynthesize but instead fixes nitrogen for its neighbors which in turn provide it with energy
- root nodule symbioses (e.g. Rhizobium) with plants that supply oxygen to the bacteria bound to molecules of leghaemoglobin
- anaerobic lifestyle (e.g. Clostridium pasteurianum)
- very fast metabolism (e.g. Azotobacter vinelandii)

The production and activity of nitrogenases is very highly regulated, both because nitrogen fixation is an extremely energetically expensive process (16–24 ATP are used per N_{2} fixed) and due to the extreme sensitivity of the nitrogenase to oxygen.

== See also ==
- Lipophilic bacteria, a minority of bacteria with lipid metabolism
