= Autotroph =

Organism type

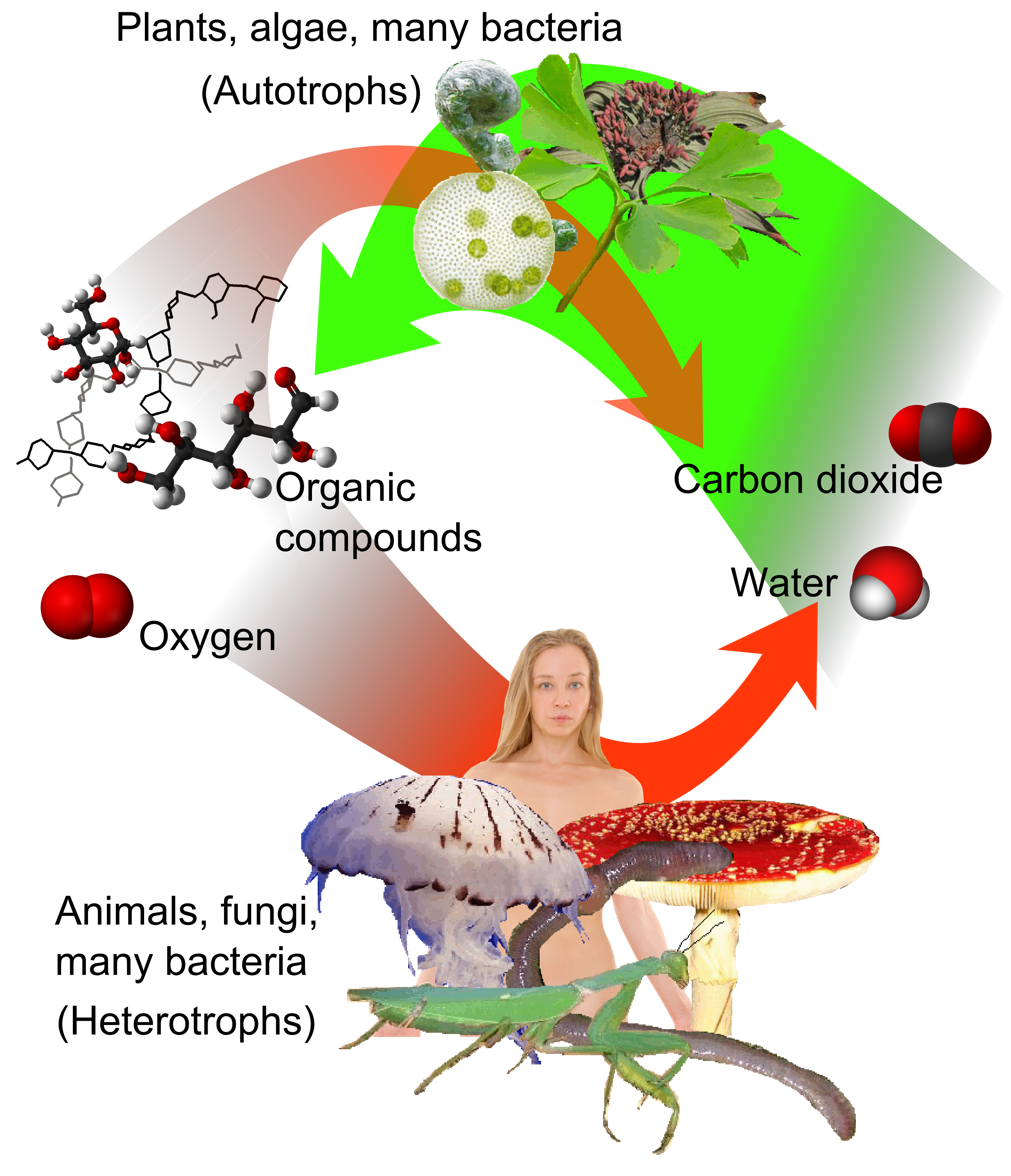
Overview of cycle between autotrophs and heterotrophs. Photosynthesis is the main means by which plants, algae and many bacteria produce organic compounds and oxygen from carbon dioxide and water (green arrow).

An autotroph is an organism that can convert abiotic sources of energy into stored energy in organic compounds, which can be used by other organisms.

== Characteristics ==
Autotrophs produce complex organic compounds (such as carbohydrates, fats, and proteins) using carbon from simple substances such as carbon dioxide, generally using energy from light or inorganic chemical reactions. Autotrophs do not need a living source of carbon or energy and are the producers in a food chain, such as plants on land or algae in water. Autotrophs can reduce carbon dioxide to make organic compounds for biosynthesis and as stored chemical fuel. Most autotrophs use water as the reducing agent, but some can use other hydrogen compounds such as hydrogen sulfide.

Autotrophs use a portion of the ATP produced during photosynthesis or the oxidation of chemical compounds to reduce NADP^{+} to NADPH and form organic compounds.

Primary producers are at the lowest trophic level, and are the reason why Earth sustains life to this day.

=== Variants ===
==== Photoautotrophs ====
Photoautotrophs convert the energy of light into chemical energy through photosynthesis, ultimately building organic molecules from carbon dioxide, an inorganic carbon source.

==== Chemoautotrophs ====
Chemolithotrophs produce biomass from the oxidation of inorganic chemical compounds. They are frequently found in hydrothermal vents in the deep ocean and include some archaea and bacteria (unicellular organisms).

Most chemoautotrophs are lithotrophs, using inorganic electron donors such as hydrogen sulfide, hydrogen gas, elemental sulfur, ammonium, and ferrous oxide as reducing agents, and hydrogen sources for biosynthesis and chemical energy release. Chemolithoautotrophs are microorganisms that synthesize energy through the oxidation of inorganic compounds. They can sustain themselves entirely on atmospheric CO_{2} and inorganic chemicals without the need for light or organic compounds. They enzymatically catalyze redox reactions using mineral substrates to generate ATP energy. These substrates primarily include hydrogen, iron, nitrogen, and sulfur. Their ecological niche is often specialized to extreme environments, including deep marine hydrothermal vents, stratified sediment, and acidic hot springs.

==== Aerotrophs ====
Aerotrophs harvest energy and carbon directly from atmospheric gases using specialized high-affinity enzymes. Electrons liberated from the gases are used for aerobic respiration, metabolic water production, and carbon fixation. Typical gas sources include molecular hydrogen, carbon dioxide, carbon monoxide, and methane, with organisms that subsist on the latter being named methanotrophs. Aerotrophy is increasingly recognized as common in numerous terrestrial, aquatic, and other ecosystems, and especially in aerated caves and other highly nutrient-limited ecosystems, such as Antarctica. Aerotrophs have been suggested as examples of how life could exist on icy moons such as Europa.

==== Heterotrophs ====
Some organisms rely on organic compounds as a source of carbon, but can use light or inorganic compounds as a source of energy. Such organisms are heterotrophs or mixotrophs. An organism that obtains carbon from organic compounds but obtains energy from light is called a photoheterotroph, while an organism that obtains carbon from organic compounds and energy from the oxidation of inorganic compounds is termed a chemolithoheterotroph.

Evidence suggests that some fungi may also obtain energy from ionizing radiation: Such radiotrophic fungi were found growing inside a reactor of the Chernobyl nuclear power plant.

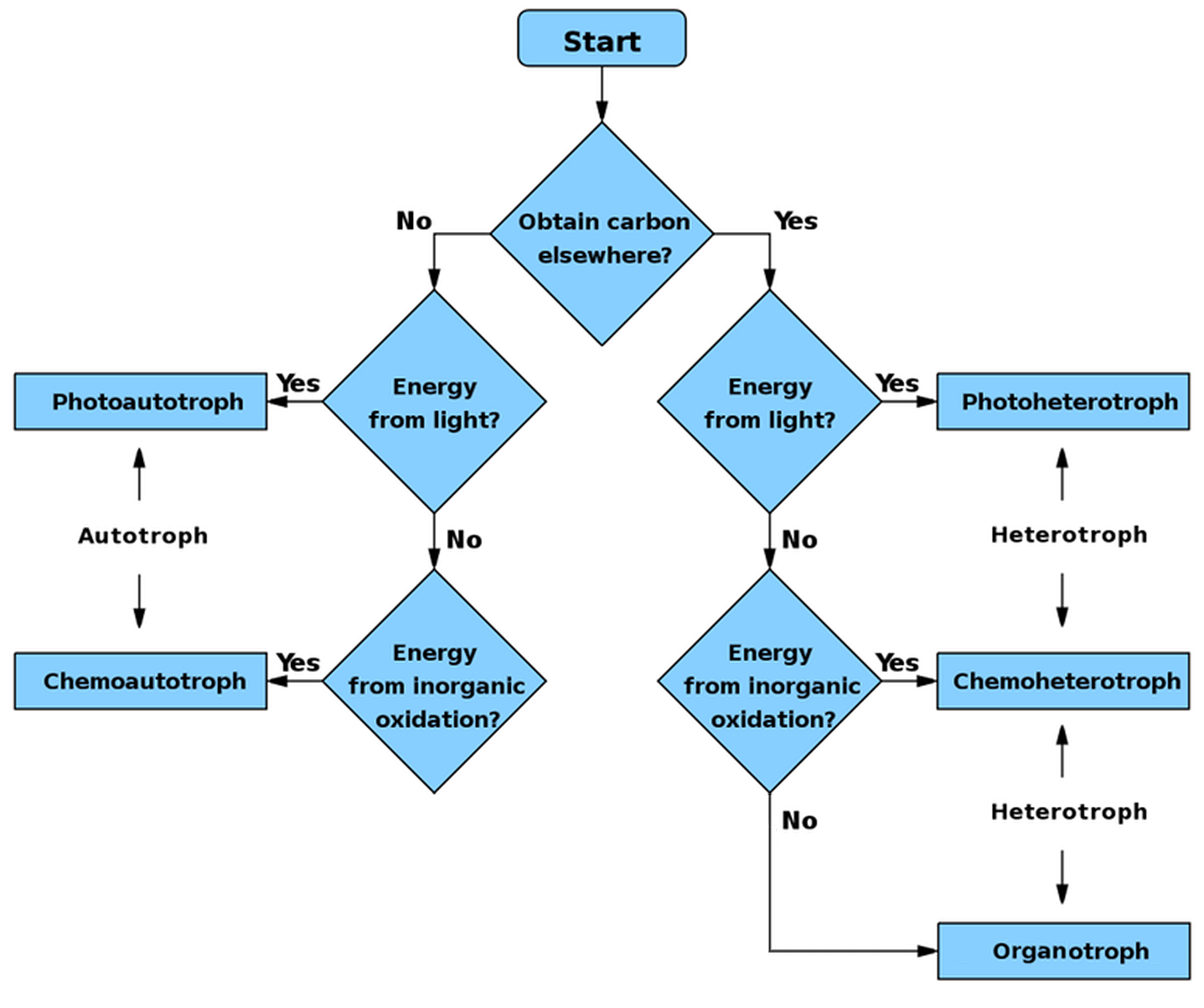
Flowchart to determine if a species is autotroph or heterotroph, and its subtype

== History ==
The term autotroph was coined by the German botanist Albert Bernhard Frank in 1892. It stems from the ancient Greek word τροφή (trophḗ), meaning "nourishment" or "food".

== Ecology ==
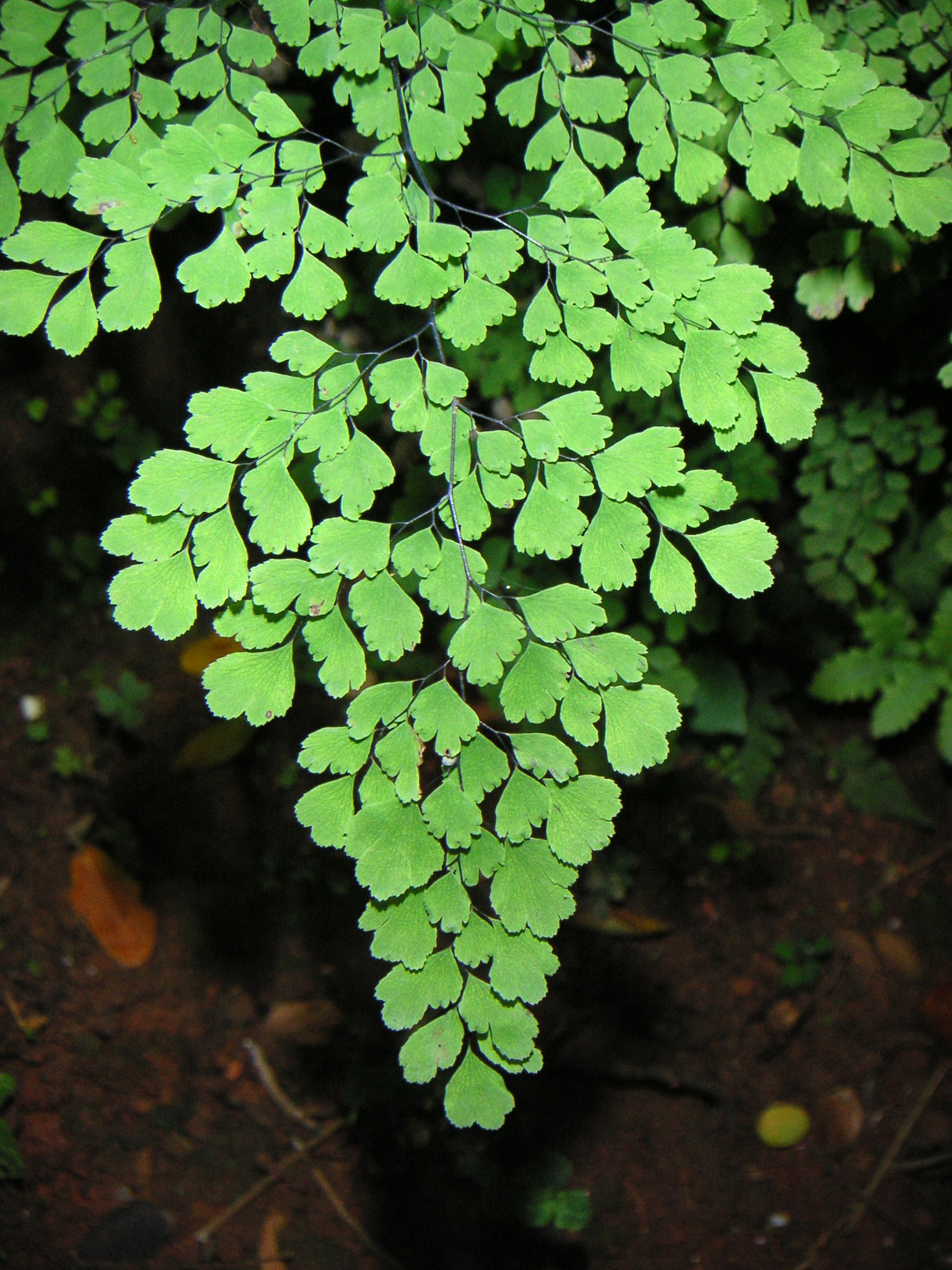
Green fronds of a maidenhair fern, a photoautotroph

Without primary producers, organisms that are capable of producing energy on their own, the biological systems of Earth would be unable to sustain themselves. Plants, along with other primary producers, produce the energy that other living beings consume and the oxygen that they breathe. It is thought that the first organisms on Earth were primary producers located on the ocean floor.

Autotrophs are fundamental to the food chains of all ecosystems in the world. They use energy from the environment in the form of sunlight or inorganic chemicals and create fuel molecules such as carbohydrates. This mechanism is called primary production. Other organisms, called heterotrophs, take in autotrophs as food to carry out functions necessary for their life. Thus, heterotrophs – all animals, almost all fungi, and most bacteria and protozoa – depend on autotrophs, or primary producers, for the raw materials and fuel they need. Heterotrophs obtain energy by breaking down carbohydrates or oxidizing organic molecules (carbohydrates, fats, and proteins) obtained in food. Carnivorous organisms rely on autotrophs indirectly, as the nutrients obtained from their heterotrophic prey come from autotrophs they have consumed.

Most ecosystems are supported by the autotrophic primary production of plants and cyanobacteria that capture photons initially released by the sun. Plants can only use a fraction (approximately 1%) of this energy for photosynthesis. The process of photosynthesis splits a water molecule (H_{2}O), releasing oxygen (O_{2}) into the atmosphere, and reducing carbon dioxide (CO_{2}) to release hydrogen atoms that fuel the metabolic process of primary production. Plants convert and store the energy of the photons into the chemical bonds of simple sugars during photosynthesis. These plant sugars are polymerized for storage as long-chain carbohydrates, such as starch and cellulose; glucose is also used to make fats and proteins. When autotrophs are eaten by heterotrophs, i.e., consumers such as animals, the carbohydrates, fats, and proteins contained in them become energy sources for the heterotrophs. Proteins can be made using nitrates, sulfates, and phosphates in the soil.

=== Primary production in tropical streams and rivers ===
Aquatic algae are a significant contributor to food webs in tropical rivers and streams. This is displayed by net primary production, a fundamental ecological process that reflects the amount of carbon that is synthesized within an ecosystem. This carbon ultimately becomes available to consumers. Net primary production displays that the rates of in-stream primary production in tropical regions are at least an order of magnitude greater than in similar temperate systems.

== Origin of autotrophs ==
Researchers believe that the first cellular lifeforms were not heterotrophs as they would rely upon autotrophs since organic substrates delivered from space were either too heterogeneous to support microbial growth or too reduced to be fermented. Instead, they consider that the first cells were autotrophs. These autotrophs might have been thermophilic and anaerobic chemolithoautotrophs that lived at deep sea alkaline hydrothermal vents. This view is supported by phylogenetic evidence – the physiology and habitat of the last universal common ancestor (LUCA) is inferred to have also been a thermophilic anaerobe with a Wood-Ljungdahl pathway, its biochemistry was replete with FeS clusters and radical reaction mechanisms. It was dependent upon Fe, H_{2}, and CO_{2}. The high concentration of K^{+} present within the cytosol of most life forms suggests that early cellular life had Na^{+}/H^{+} antiporters or possibly symporters. Autotrophs possibly evolved into heterotrophs when they were at low H_{2} partial pressures where the first form of heterotrophy were likely amino acid and clostridial type purine fermentations. It has been suggested that photosynthesis emerged in the presence of faint near-infrared light emitted by hydrothermal vents. The first photochemically active pigments are then thought to be Zn-tetrapyrroles.

The first autotrophic organisms likely evolved early in the Archean but proliferated across Earth's Great Oxidation Event with an increase to the rate of oxygenic photosynthesis by cyanobacteria. Photoautotrophs evolved from heterotrophic bacteria by developing photosynthesis. The earliest photosynthetic bacteria used hydrogen sulfide. Due to the scarcity of hydrogen sulfide, some photosynthetic bacteria evolved to use water in photosynthesis, leading to cyanobacteria.

== See also ==
- Electrolithoautotroph
- Electrotroph
- Heterotroph
- Heterotrophic nutrition
- Organotroph
- Primary nutritional groups
