= Lithotroph =

Organism using inorganic substrate to obtain reducing equivalents for use in biosynthesis

Lithotrophs are a diverse group of organisms using an inorganic substrate (usually of mineral origin) to obtain reducing equivalents for use in biosynthesis (e.g., carbon dioxide fixation) or energy conservation (i.e., ATP production) via aerobic or anaerobic respiration. While lithotrophs in the broader sense include photolithotrophs like plants, chemolithotrophs are exclusively microorganisms; no known macrofauna possesses the ability to use inorganic compounds as electron sources. Macrofauna and lithotrophs can form symbiotic relationships, in which case the lithotrophs are called "prokaryotic symbionts". An example of this is chemolithotrophic bacteria in giant tube worms; or plastids, which are organelles within plant cells that may have evolved from photolithotrophic cyanobacteria-like organisms. Chemolithotrophs belong to the domains Bacteria and Archaea. The term "lithotroph" was created from the Greek terms 'lithos' (rock) and 'troph' (consumer), meaning "eaters of rock". Many but not all lithoautotrophs are extremophiles.

The last universal common ancestor of life is thought to be a chemolithotroph. Different from a lithotroph is an organotroph, an organism which obtains its reducing agents from the catabolism of organic compounds.

== History ==
The term was suggested in 1946 by Lwoff and collaborators.

== Biochemistry ==
Lithotrophs consume reduced inorganic compounds (electron donors).

=== Chemolithotrophs ===
A chemolithotroph is able to use inorganic reduced compounds in its energy-producing reactions. This process involves the oxidation of inorganic compounds coupled to ATP synthesis. The majority of chemolithotrophs are chemolithoautotrophs, able to fix carbon dioxide (CO_{2}) through various metabolic pathways such as the Calvin cycle, a metabolic pathway in which CO_{2} is converted to glucose. This group of organisms includes sulfur oxidizers, nitrifying bacteria, iron oxidizers, and hydrogen oxidizers.

The term "chemolithotrophy" refers to a cell's acquisition of energy from the oxidation of inorganic compounds, also known as electron donors. This form of metabolism is believed to occur only in prokaryotes and was first characterized by Ukrainian microbiologist Sergei Winogradsky.

==== Habitat of chemolithotrophs ====
The survival of these bacteria is dependent on the physiochemical conditions of their environment. Although they are sensitive to certain factors such as the quality of inorganic substrate, they are able to thrive under some of the most inhospitable conditions in the world, such as temperatures above 110 degrees Celsius and below 2 pH. The most important requirement for chemolithotropic life is an abundant source of inorganic compounds, which provide a suitable electron donor in order to fix CO_{2} and produce the energy the microorganism needs to survive. Since chemosynthesis can take place in the absence of sunlight, these organisms are found mostly around hydrothermal vents and other locations rich in inorganic substrate.

The energy obtained from inorganic oxidation varies depending on the substrate and the reaction. For example, the oxidation of hydrogen sulfide to elemental sulfur by ½O_{2} produces far less energy (50 kcal/mol or 210 kJ/mol) than the oxidation of elemental sulfur to sulfate (150 kcal/mol or 627 kJ/mol) by 3/2 O_{2}. The majority of lithotrophs fix carbon dioxide through the Calvin cycle, an energetically expensive process. For some low-energy substrates, such as ferrous iron, the cells must cull through large amounts of inorganic substrate to secure just a small amount of energy. This makes their metabolic process inefficient in many places and hinders them from thriving.

==== Overview of the metabolic process ====
There is a fairly large variation in the types of inorganic substrates that these microorganisms can use to produce energy. Sulfur is one of many inorganic substrates that can be used in different reduced forms depending on the specific biochemical process that a lithotroph uses. The chemolithotrophs that are best documented are aerobes, though the list of these microorganisms that employ anaerobic respiration is growing. At the heart of this metabolic process is an electron transport system that is similar to that of chemoorganotrophs. The major difference between these two microorganisms is that chemolithotrophs directly provide electrons to the electron transport chain, while chemoorganotrophs must generate their own cellular reducing power by oxidizing reduced organic compounds. Chemolithotrophs bypass this by obtaining their reducing power directly from the inorganic substrate or by the reverse electron transport reaction. Certain specialized chemolithotrophic bacteria use different derivatives of the Sox system – a central pathway specific to sulfur oxidation. This ancient and unique pathway illustrates the power that chemolithotrophs have evolved to use from inorganic substrates, such as sulfur.

In chemolithotrophs, the compounds – the electron donors – are oxidized in the cell, and the electrons are channeled into respiratory chains, ultimately producing ATP. The electron acceptor can be oxygen (in aerobic bacteria), but a variety of other electron acceptors, organic and inorganic, are also used by various species. Aerobic bacteria such as the nitrifying bacteria, Nitrobacter, use oxygen to oxidize nitrite to nitrate. Some lithotrophs produce organic compounds from carbon dioxide in a process called chemosynthesis, much as plants do in photosynthesis. Plants use energy from sunlight to drive carbon dioxide fixation, but chemosynthesis can take place in the absence of sunlight (e.g., around a hydrothermal vent). Ecosystems establish in and around hydrothermal vents as the abundance of inorganic substances, namely hydrogen, are constantly being supplied via magma in pockets below the sea floor. Other lithotrophs are able to directly use inorganic substances, e.g., ferrous iron, hydrogen sulfide, elemental sulfur, thiosulfate, or ammonia, for some or all of their energy needs.

Here are a few examples of chemolithotrophic pathways, any of which may use oxygen or nitrate as electron acceptors:

Name	Examples	Source of electrons	Respiration electron acceptor
Iron bacteria	Acidithiobacillus ferrooxidans	Fe^{2+} (ferrous iron) → Fe^{3+} (ferric iron) + e^{−}	O_{2} (oxygen) + 4H^{+} + 4e^{−}→ 2H_{2}O
Nitrosifying bacteria	Nitrosomonas	NH_{3} (ammonia) + 2H_{2}O → NO^{−}_{2} (nitrite) + 7H^{+} + 6e^{−}	O_{2} (oxygen) + 4H^{+} + 4e^{−} → 2H_{2}O
Nitrifying bacteria	Nitrobacter	NO^{−}_{2} (nitrite) + H_{2}O → NO^{−}_{3} (nitrate) + 2H^{+} + 2e^{−}	O_{2} (oxygen) + 4H^{+} + 4e^{−} → 2H_{2}O
Chemotrophic purple sulfur bacteria	Halothiobacillaceae	S^{2−} (sulfide) → S^{0} (sulfur) + 2e^{−}	O_{2} (oxygen) + 4H^{+} + 4e^{−}→ 2H_{2}O
Sulfur-oxidizing bacteria	Chemotrophic Rhodobacteraceae and Thiotrichaceae	S^{0} (sulfur) + 4H_{2}O → SO^{2−}_{4} (sulfate) + 8H^{+} + 6e^{−}	O_{2} (oxygen) + 4H^{+} + 4e^{−}→ 2H_{2}O
Aerobic hydrogen bacteria	Cupriavidus metallidurans	H_{2} (hydrogen) → 2H^{+} + 2e^{−}	O_{2} (oxygen) + 4H^{+} + 4e^{−}→ 2H_{2}O
Anammox bacteria	Planctomycetota	NH^{+}_{4} (ammonium) → 1/2N_{2} (nitrogen) + 4H^{+} + 3e^{−}	NO^{−}_{2} (nitrite) + 4H^{+} + 3e^{−}→ 1/2N_{2} (nitrogen) + 2H_{2}O
Thiobacillus denitrificans	Thiobacillus denitrificans	S^{0} (sulfur) + 4H_{2}O → SO^{2−}_{4} + 8H^{+} + 6e^{−}	NO^{−}_{3} (nitrate) + 6H^{+} + 5e^{−}→ 1/2N_{2} (nitrogen) + 3H_{2}O
Sulfate-reducing bacteria: Hydrogen bacteria	Desulfovibrio paquesii	H_{2} (hydrogen) → 2H^{+} + 2e^{−}	SO^{2−}_{4} + 8H^{+} + 6e^{−} → S^{0} + 4H_{2}O
Sulfate-reducing bacteria: Phosphite bacteria	Desulfotignum phosphitoxidans	PO^{3−}_{3} (phosphite) + H_{2}O → PO^{3−}_{4} (phosphate) + 2H^{+} + 2e^{−}	SO^{2−}_{4} (sulfate) + 8H^{+} + 6e^{−} → S^{0} (sulfur) + 4H_{2}O
Methanogens	Archaea	H_{2} (hydrogen) → 2H^{+} + 2e^{−}	CO_{2} + 8H^{+} + 8e^{−} → CH_{4} (methane) + 2H_{2}O
Carboxydotrophic bacteria	Carboxydothermus hydrogenoformans	CO (carbon monoxide) + H_{2}O → CO_{2} + 2H^{+} + 2e^{−}	2H^{+} + 2e^{−} → H_{2} (hydrogen)

=== Photolithotrophs ===
Photolithotrophs such as plants obtain energy from light and therefore use inorganic electron donors such as water only to fuel biosynthetic reactions (e. g., carbon dioxide fixation in lithoautotrophs).

=== Lithoheterotrophs versus lithoautotrophs ===
Lithotrophic bacteria cannot use, of course, their inorganic energy source as a carbon source for the synthesis of their cells. They choose one of three options:

- Lithoheterotrophs do not have the ability to fix carbon dioxide and must consume additional organic compounds in order to break them apart and use their carbon. Only a few bacteria are fully lithoheterotrophic.
- Lithoautotrophs are able to use carbon dioxide from the air as a carbon source, the same way plants do.
- Mixotrophs will take up and use organic material to complement their carbon dioxide fixation source (mix between autotrophy and heterotrophy). Many lithotrophs are recognized as mixotrophic in regard to their C-metabolism.

=== Chemolithotrophs versus photolithotrophs ===
In addition to this division, lithotrophs differ in the initial energy source which initiates ATP production:

- Chemolithotrophs use the above-mentioned inorganic compounds for aerobic or anaerobic respiration. The energy produced by the oxidation of these compounds is enough for ATP production. Some of the electrons derived from the inorganic donors also need to be channeled into biosynthesis. Mostly, additional energy has to be invested to transform these reducing equivalents to the forms and redox potentials needed (mostly NADH or NADPH), which occurs by reverse electron transfer reactions.
- Photolithotrophs use light as their energy source. These organisms are photosynthetic; examples of photolithotrophic bacteria are purple bacteria (e. g., Chromatiaceae), green bacteria (Chlorobiaceae and Chloroflexota), and "Cyanobacteria". Purple and green bacteria oxidize sulfide, sulfur, sulfite, iron or hydrogen. Cyanobacteria and plants extract reducing equivalents from water, i.e., they oxidize water to oxygen. The electrons obtained from the electron donors are not used for ATP production (as long as there is light); they are used in biosynthetic reactions. Some photolithotrophs shift over to chemolithotrophic metabolism in the dark.

== Geological significance ==
Lithotrophs participate in many geological processes, such as the formation of soil and the biogeochemical cycling of carbon, nitrogen, and other elements. Lithotrophs also associate with the modern-day issue of acid mine drainage. Lithotrophs may be present in a variety of environments, including deep terrestrial subsurfaces, soils, mines, and in endolith communities.

=== Soil formation ===
A primary example of lithotrophs that contribute to soil formation is Cyanobacteria. This group of bacteria are nitrogen-fixing photolithotrophs that are capable of using energy from sunlight and inorganic nutrients from rocks as reductants. This capability allows for their growth and development on native, oligotrophic rocks and aids in the subsequent deposition of their organic matter (nutrients) for other organisms to colonize. Colonization can initiate the process of organic compound decomposition: a primary factor for soil genesis. Such a mechanism has been attributed as part of the early evolutionary processes that helped shape the biological Earth.

=== Biogeochemical cycling ===
Biogeochemical cycling of elements is an essential component of lithotrophs within microbial environments. For example, in the carbon cycle, there are certain bacteria classified as photolithoautotrophs that generate organic carbon from atmospheric carbon dioxide. Certain chemolithoautotrophic bacteria can also produce organic carbon, some even in the absence of light. Similar to plants, these microbes provide a usable form of energy for organisms to consume. On the contrary, there are lithotrophs that have the ability to ferment, implying their ability to convert organic carbon into another usable form. Lithotrophs play an important role in the biological aspect of the iron cycle. These organisms can use iron as either an electron donor, Fe(II) → Fe(III), or as an electron acceptor, Fe (III) → Fe(II). Another example is the cycling of nitrogen. Many lithotrophic bacteria play a role in reducing inorganic nitrogen (nitrogen gas) to organic nitrogen (ammonium) in a process called nitrogen fixation. Likewise, there are many lithotrophic bacteria that also convert ammonium into nitrogen gas in a process called denitrification. Carbon and nitrogen are important nutrients, essential for metabolic processes, and can sometimes be the limiting factor that affects organismal growth and development. Thus, lithotrophs are key players in both providing and removing these important resource.

=== Acid mine drainage ===
Lithotrophic microbes are responsible for the phenomenon known as acid mine drainage. Typically occurring in mining areas, this process concerns the active metabolism of pyrites and other reduced sulfur components to sulfate. One example is the acidophilic bacterial genus, A. ferrooxidans, that use iron(II) sulfide (FeS_{2}) to generate sulfuric acid. The acidic product of these specific lithotrophs has the potential to drain from the mining area via water run-off and enter the environment.

Acid mine drainage drastically alters the acidity (pH values of 2–3) and chemistry of groundwater and streams, and may endanger plant and animal populations downstream of mining areas. Activities similar to acid mine drainage, but on a much lower scale, are also found in natural conditions such as the rocky beds of glaciers, in soil and talus, on stone monuments and buildings and in the deep subsurface.

== Astrobiology ==
It has been suggested that biominerals could be important indicators of extraterrestrial life and thus could play an important role in the search for past or present life on the planet Mars. Furthermore, organic components (biosignatures) that are often associated with biominerals are believed to play crucial roles in both pre-biotic and biotic reactions.

On January 24, 2014, NASA reported that current studies by the Curiosity and Opportunity rovers on Mars will now be searching for evidence of ancient life, including a biosphere based on autotrophic, chemotrophic and/or chemolithoautotrophic microorganisms, as well as ancient water, including fluvio-lacustrine environments (plains related to ancient rivers or lakes) that may have been habitable. The search for evidence of habitability, taphonomy (related to fossils), and organic carbon on the planet Mars is now a primary NASA objective.

== See also ==
- Autotroph
- Electrolithoautotroph
- Endolith
- Heterotroph
- Microbial metabolism
- Organotroph
- Dissimilatory metal-reducing microorganisms
- Zetaproteobacteria
