= Mossii =

Mossii may refer to:

- Callophrys mossii, species of butterfly
- Dysgonomonas mossii, species of bacteria
- Habenaria mossii, species of plant
