= Heliorestis baculata =

Scientific classification
- Domain: Bacteria
- Kingdom: Bacillati
- Phylum: Bacillota
- Class: Clostridia
- Order: Heliobacteriales
- Family: Heliobacteriaceae
- Genus: Heliorestis
- Species: H. baculata

Binomial name
- Heliorestis baculata Bryantseva et al. 2001

Type strain
- DSM 13446, strain OS-H1

Species of bacterium

Heliorestis baculata is a rod-shaped bacterium from the genus of Heliorestis which has been isolated from shoreline soil from the Llake Ostozhe in Siberia.
