= Fermentimonas caenicola =

Scientific classification
- Domain: Bacteria
- Kingdom: Pseudomonadati
- Phylum: Bacteroidota
- Class: Bacteroidia
- Order: Bacteroidales
- Family: Dysgonomonadaceae
- Genus: Fermentimonas
- Species: F. caenicola

Binomial name
- Fermentimonas caenicola Hahnke et al. 2016

Type strain
- CECT 8609, DSM 28696, LMG 28429, ING2 E5B

Species of bacterium

Fermentimonas caenicola is a Gram-negative bacterium from the genus Fermentimonas.
