= Dysgonomonas alginatilytica =

Scientific classification
- Domain: Bacteria
- Kingdom: Pseudomonadati
- Phylum: Bacteroidota
- Class: Bacteroidia
- Order: Bacteroidales
- Family: Dysgonomonadaceae
- Genus: Dysgonomonas
- Species: D. alginatilytica

Binomial name
- Dysgonomonas alginatilytica Kita et al. 2015

Type strain
- DSM 100214, HUT 8134, HUA-2

Synonyms
- Dysgonomonas alginolyticum

Species of bacterium

Dysgonomonas alginatilytica is a Gram-negative, facultatively anaerobic, non-spore-forming and non-motile bacterium from the genus Dysgonomonas which has been isolated from sea sand from Hiroshima on Japan. Dysgonomonas alginatilytica has the ability to degrade alginate.
