= Dysgonomonas oryzarvi =

Scientific classification
- Domain: Bacteria
- Kingdom: Pseudomonadati
- Phylum: Bacteroidota
- Class: Bacteroidia
- Order: Bacteroidales
- Genus: Dysgonomonadaceae
- Genus: Dysgonomonas
- Species: D. oryzarvi

Binomial name
- Dysgonomonas oryzarvi Kodama et al. 2012

Type strain
- JCM 16859, KCTC 5936, Dy73

Species of bacterium

Dysgonomonas oryzarvi is a Gram-negative, short-rod-shaped, anaerobic and non-motile bacterium from the genus Dysgonomonas.
