= Heliorestis convulata =

Scientific classification
- Domain: Bacteria
- Kingdom: Bacillati
- Phylum: Bacillota
- Class: Clostridia
- Order: Heliobacteriales
- Family: Heliobacteriaceae
- Genus: Heliorestis
- Species: H. convulata

Binomial name
- Heliorestis convulata Asao et al. 2006

Species of bacterium

Heliorestis convulata is an alkaliphilic and coiled bacterium from the genus of Heliorestis which has been isolated from soil and water from the Lake El Hamra from Wadi El Natroun in Egypt.
