= Proteiniphilum acetatigenes =

Scientific classification
- Domain: Bacteria
- Kingdom: Pseudomonadati
- Phylum: Bacteroidota
- Class: Bacteroidia
- Order: Bacteroidales
- Family: Dysgonomonadaceae
- Genus: Proteiniphilum
- Species: P. acetatigenes

Binomial name
- Proteiniphilum acetatigenes Chen and Dong 2005 emend. Hahnke et al. 2016

Synonyms
- Peptophilum propionigenum

Species of bacterium

Proteiniphilum acetatigenes is a Gram-negative, rod-shaped, non-spore-forming, proteolytic, strictly anaerobic and motile bacterium from the genus of Proteiniphilum which has been isolated from granule sludge from a UASB reactor in China.
