= Chemotroph =

Organisms that obtain energy by the oxidation of electron donors in their environments

A chemotroph is an organism that obtains energy by the oxidation of electron donors in their environments. These molecules can be organic (chemoorganotrophs) or inorganic (chemolithotrophs). The chemotroph designation is in contrast to phototrophs, which use photons. Chemotrophs can be either autotrophic or heterotrophic. Chemotrophs can be found in areas where electron donors are present in high concentration, for instance around hydrothermal vents. Some examples of chemotrophic organisms include iron-oxidizing bacteria and methanogenic archaea.

== Chemoautotroph ==
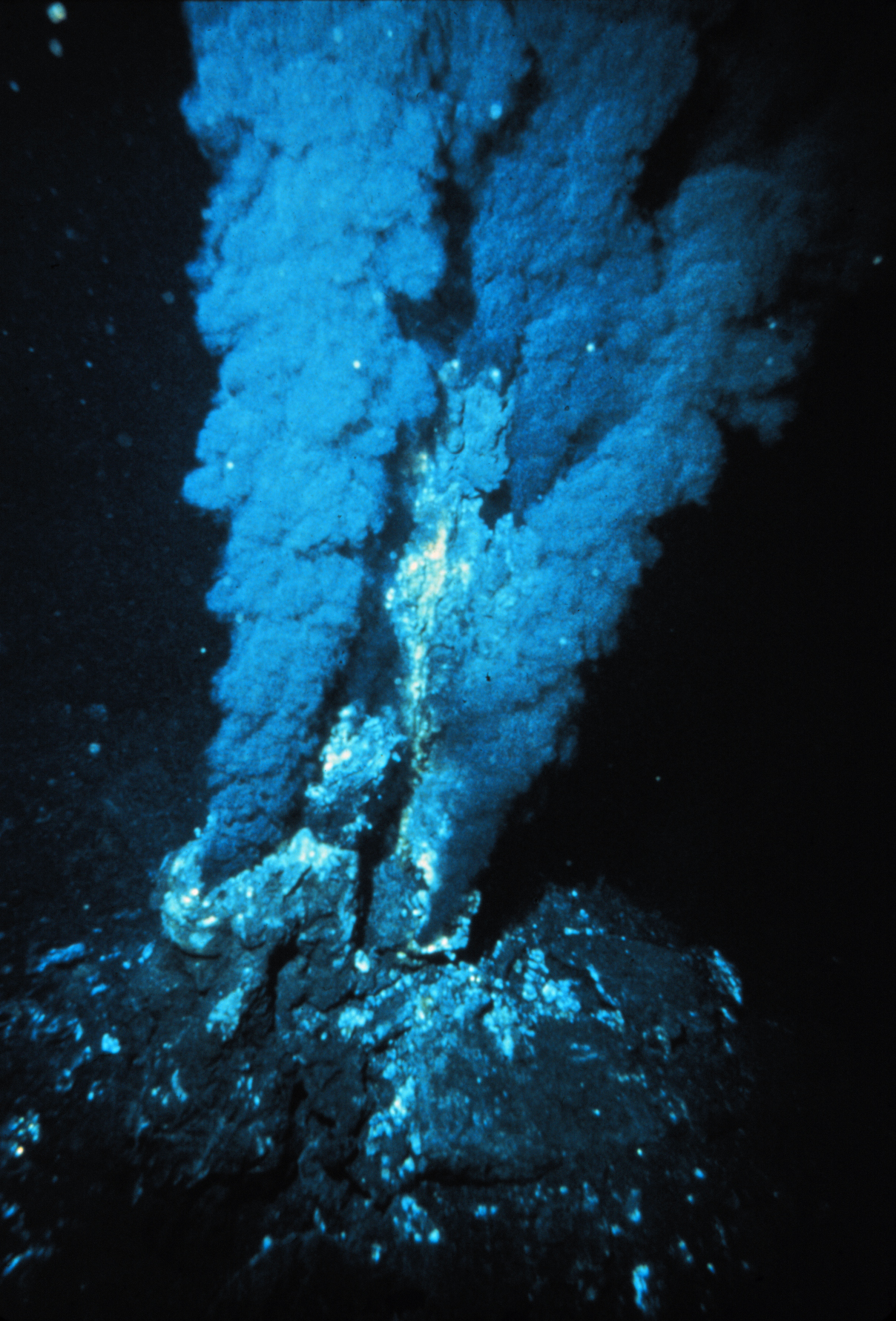
A black smoker vent in the Atlantic Ocean, providing energy and nutrients for chemotrophs

Chemoautotrophs are autotrophic organisms that can rely on chemosynthesis, i.e. deriving biological energy from chemical reactions of environmental inorganic substrates and synthesizing all necessary organic compounds from carbon dioxide. Chemoautotrophs can use inorganic energy sources such as hydrogen sulfide, elemental sulfur, ferrous iron, molecular hydrogen, and ammonia or organic sources to produce energy. Most chemoautotrophs are prokaryotic extremophiles, bacteria, or archaea that live in otherwise hostile environments (such as deep sea vents) and are the primary producers in such ecosystems. Chemoautotrophs generally fall into several groups: methanogens, sulfur oxidizers and reducers, nitrifiers, anammox bacteria, and thermoacidophiles. An example of one of these prokaryotes would be Sulfolobus. Chemolithotrophic growth can be very fast, such as Hydrogenovibrio crunogenus with a doubling time around one hour.

The term "chemosynthesis", coined in 1897 by Wilhelm Pfeffer, originally was defined as the energy production by oxidation of inorganic substances in association with autotrophy — what would be named today as chemolithoautotrophy. Later, the term would include also the chemoorganoautotrophy, that is, it can be seen as a synonym of chemoautotrophy.

== Chemoheterotroph ==
Chemoheterotrophs (or chemotrophic heterotrophs) are unable to fix carbon to form their own organic compounds. Chemoheterotrophs can be chemolithoheterotrophs, utilizing inorganic electron sources such as sulfur, iron, or, much more commonly, chemoorganoheterotrophs, utilizing organic electron sources such as carbohydrates, lipids, and proteins. Most animals and fungi are examples of chemoheterotrophs, as are some halophiles.

=== Iron-oxidizing bacteria ===
Iron-oxidizing bacteria are chemotrophic bacteria that derive energy by oxidizing dissolved ferrous iron. They are known to grow and proliferate in waters containing iron concentrations as low as 0.1 mg/L. However, at least 0.3 ppm of dissolved oxygen is needed to carry out the oxidation.

Iron has many existing roles in biology not related to redox reactions; examples include iron–sulfur proteins, hemoglobin, and coordination complexes. Iron has a widespread distribution globally and is considered one of the most abundant in the Earth's crust, soil, and sediments. Iron is a trace element in marine environments. Its role as the electron donor for some chemolithotrophs is probably very ancient.

=== Methanogens ===
Methanogens are chemotrophic archaea that obtain energy most commonly through CO_{2} reduction by H_{2} (hydrogenotrophs) or fermentation of acetate (acetoclastic). They are distinct from other bacteria or archea that do not depend on methane synthesis for energy but produce methane as a byproduct of their other metabolic processes. Methanogens are also different from bacteria and eukarya due to a lack of peptidoglycan in their cell wall, rather methanogens contain either pseudomurein, heteropolysaccharide, or protein-based cell walls. Species that reduce CO_{2} are chemoautotrophs and fix inorganic carbon, however, a few species use organic carbon in the form of acetate, making them chemoheterotrophs. Methanogens belong to the Methanobacteriota kingdom. Methanogens are a part of an ancient monophyletic lineage, the Methanobacteriati phylum (formerly "Euryarcheota"), and can be classified into three classes, six orders, twelve families and thirty-five genera. Methanogenic metabolic pathways are thought to be present in some of the earliest organisms that occupied the earth. Today, methanogens can be found in a wide range of environments, both oxic and anoxic and both terrestrial and aquatic, especially environments containing low sulfate. Their activity is strongly regulated by temperature, pH, substrate and nutrient availability, as well as competition with other anaerobic microbes, all of which influence their distribution across diverse environments.

Methanogenic archaea are involved in the late steps of degradation of organic matter. In many anaerobic environments, methanogens form syntropic relationships with other fermentative bacteria that supply them with substrates such as H2, formate, and acetate. Since the energy yield of methanogenesis is relatively low compared to other processes, methanogenesis does not become the dominant process until the more energy-rich electron acceptors such as O_{2}, NO_{3}^{-}, and SO_{4}^{2-} have already been depleted. Due to the absence of these electron acceptors, methanogens can then catalyze the final step of the degradation of organic matter which is essential for anaerobic environments. While different organisms may use different substrates, they all share methane as the final metabolic product, and they are all anaerobic. In addition to CO_{2} and acetate, methanogens also use formate, methylamine and other small molecules to produce CH_{4}. Regardless of the substrate, all methanogenic archaea utilize the enzyme methyl-coenzyme M reductase, which performs the final step of reducing methyl-coenzyme M to methane. Methanogens also possess several unique coenzymes such as coenzyme F430 and methanopterin, among others. Methanogenic activity contributes to methane that is locked in long-term reservoirs such as permafrost, and as climate warming accelerates thawing of frozen soils, methane production by methanogens is expected increase. As methane has around 25-30 times the global warming potential of CO_{2}, methane is one of the greenhouse gases driving climate change that is a source of concern for climate scientists.

== See also ==
- Chemosynthesis
- Lithotroph
- Methanogen (feeds on hydrogen)
- Methanotroph
- RISE project – expedition that discovered high-temperature vent communities
