= Methanothermus sociabilis =

Scientific classification
- Domain: Archaea
- Kingdom: Methanobacteriati
- Phylum: Methanobacteriota
- Class: Methanobacteria
- Order: Methanobacteriales
- Family: Methanothermaceae
- Genus: Methanothermus
- Species: M. sociabilis

Binomial name
- Methanothermus sociabilis Stetter et al., 1986

Species of archaeon

Methanothermus sociabilis is a species of methanogen. It grows in large clusters 1 to 3 mm in diameter and in temperatures of up to 97 °C (207 °F). It is found solely in the solfataric fields in Iceland. The cells are bar-shaped and grow strictly through the reduction of carbon dioxide with hydrogen, producing methane.
