= Carbon source (biology) =

Source of carbon in a biological context

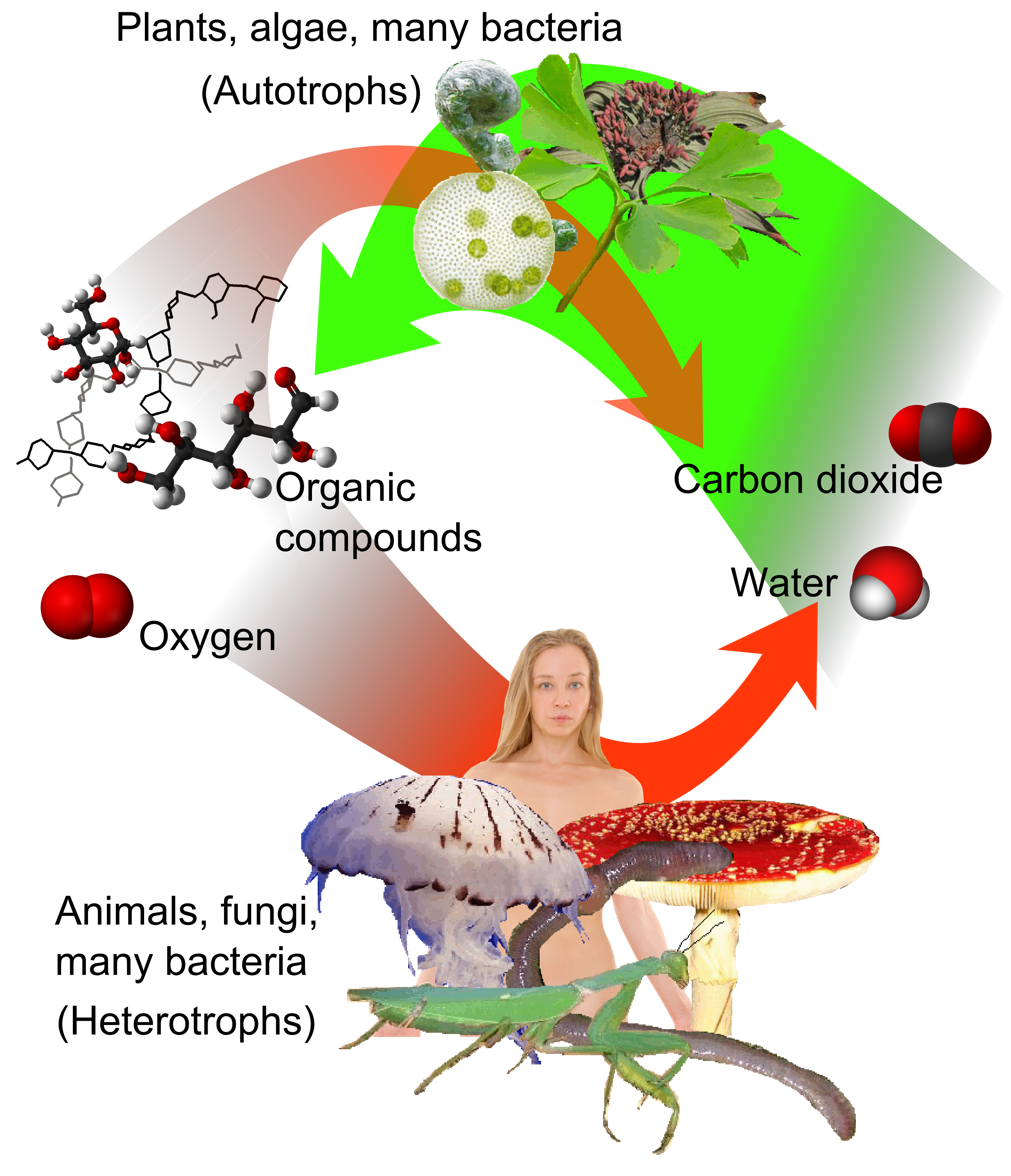
Autotrophs mainly use carbon dioxide (CO_{2}) through the process of photosynthesis as their carbon source (green arrow), whereas heterotrophs must acquire carbon by consuming organic compounds from autotrophs or other heterotrophs. Both types of organisms generate CO_{2} as a metabolic byproduct (red arrows).

A carbon source is a carbon-containing molecule that is used by an organism to synthesize biomass. Such sources may be organic or inorganic. Heterotrophs must use organic molecules as a source of both carbon and energy. In contrast, autotrophs may use inorganic materials as a source for both, such as inorganic chemical energy (chemolithotrophs) or light (photoautotrophs). The carbon cycle, which begins with an inorganic carbon source (such as carbon dioxide) and progresses through the biological carbon fixation process, includes the biological use of carbon as one of its components.^{[1]}

== Types of organism by carbon source ==
=== Autotrophs ===
An autotroph is an organism that can convert abiotic sources of energy into energy stored in organic compounds, which can be used by other organisms. Autotrophs produce complex organic compounds (such as carbohydrates, fats, and proteins) using carbon from simple substances such as carbon dioxide, generally using energy from light or inorganic chemical reactions. Autotrophs do not need a living source of carbon or energy, and are the producers in a food chain, such as plants on land or algae in water. Autotrophs can reduce carbon dioxide to make organic compounds for biosynthesis and as stored chemical fuel. Most autotrophs use water as the reducing agent, but some can use other hydrogen compounds such as hydrogen sulfide.

=== Heterotrophs ===
A heterotroph (/ˈhɛtərəˌtroʊf, -ˌtrɒf/; from Ancient Greek ἕτερος (héteros), meaning "other", and τροφή (trophḗ), meaning "nourishment") is an organism that cannot produce its own food, instead taking nutrition from other sources of organic carbon, mainly matter from other organisms. In the food chain, heterotrophs are primary, secondary and tertiary consumers, but not producers. Living organisms that are heterotrophic include most animals, all fungi, some bacteria and protists, and many parasitic plants. The term heterotroph arose in microbiology in 1946 as part of a classification of microorganisms based on their type of nutrition. The term is now used in many fields, such as ecology, in describing the food chain. Heterotrophs occupy the second and third trophic levels of the food chain while autotrophs occupy the first trophic level.

== See also ==
- Carbon-based life
