= Dysgonomonas termitidis =

Scientific classification
- Domain: Bacteria
- Kingdom: Pseudomonadati
- Phylum: Bacteroidota
- Class: Bacteroidia
- Order: Bacteroidales
- Genus: Dysgonomonadaceae
- Genus: Dysgonomonas
- Species: D. termitidis

Binomial name
- Dysgonomonas termitidis Pramono et al. 2015

Type strain
- CCUG 66188, JCM 30204, N-10

Species of bacterium

Dysgonomonas termitidis is a Gram-negative, anaerobic and non-motile bacterium from the genus Dysgonomonas which has been isolated from the gut of the termite Reticulitermes speratus.
