= Heliorestis daurensis =

Scientific classification
- Domain: Bacteria
- Kingdom: Bacillati
- Phylum: Bacillota
- Class: Clostridia
- Order: Heliobacteriales
- Family: Heliobacteriaceae
- Genus: Heliorestis
- Species: H. daurensis

Binomial name
- Heliorestis daurensis Bryantseva et al. 2000

Type strain
- ATCC 700798, strain BT-H1

Synonyms
- Heliospira daurica

Species of bacterium

Heliorestis daurensis is an alkaliphilic and rod-shaped bacterium from the genus of Heliorestis which has been isolated from a soda lake from Siberia.
