= Dysgonomonas macrotermitis =

Scientific classification
- Domain: Bacteria
- Kingdom: Pseudomonadati
- Phylum: Bacteroidota
- Class: Bacteroidia
- Order: Bacteroidales
- Genus: Dysgonomonadaceae
- Genus: Dysgonomonas
- Species: D. macrotermitis

Binomial name
- Dysgonomonas macrotermitis Yang et al. 2014

Type strain
- DSM 27370, Dys-CH1, JCM 19375

Synonyms
- Dysgonomonas qibebti

Species of bacterium

Dysgonomonas macrotermitis is a Gram-negative, facultatively anaerobic and non-motile bacterium from the genus Dysgonomonas which has been isolated from the hindgut from the termite Macrotermes barneyi.
