= Dysgonomonas capnocytophagoides =

Scientific classification
- Domain: Bacteria
- Kingdom: Pseudomonadati
- Phylum: Bacteroidota
- Class: Bacteroidia
- Order: Bacteroidales
- Genus: Dysgonomonadaceae
- Genus: Dysgonomonas
- Species: D. capnocytophagoides

Binomial name
- Dysgonomonas capnocytophagoides Hofstad et al. 2000

Type strain
- A 172/86, CCUG 17996, CCUG 43458, CDC F9047, CIP 107043, CL 282/85, JCM 16697, LMG 11519, P957, SSI Fsk10268

Species of bacterium

Dysgonomonas capnocytophagoides is a Gram-negative and anaerobic bacterium from the genus Dysgonomonas which has been first isolated from a cutaneous abscess from a human in Denmark. Dysgonomonas capnocytophagoides can cause diarrhoea and bacteraemia.
