= Dysgonomonas hofstadii =

Scientific classification
- Domain: Bacteria
- Kingdom: Pseudomonadati
- Phylum: Bacteroidota
- Class: Bacteroidia
- Order: Bacteroidales
- Genus: Dysgonomonadaceae
- Genus: Dysgonomonas
- Species: D. hofstadii

Binomial name
- Dysgonomonas hofstadii Lawson et al., 2010

Type strain
- CCM 7606, CCUG 54731, JCM 17038, MX 1040

Species of bacterium

Dysgonomonas hofstadii is a Gram-negative and facultatively anaerobic bacterium from the genus Dysgonomonas, which has been isolated from a post-operative abdominal wound.
