= Heliorestis acidaminivorans =

Scientific classification
- Domain: Bacteria
- Kingdom: Bacillati
- Phylum: Bacillota
- Class: Clostridia
- Order: Heliobacteriales
- Family: Heliobacteriaceae
- Genus: Heliorestis
- Species: H. acidaminivorans

Binomial name
- Heliorestis acidaminivorans Asao et al. 2012

Type strain
- ATCC BAA-2399, DSM 24790, NCMAB119, strain HR10B

Species of bacterium

Heliorestis acidaminivorans is an obligate anaerobic bacterium from the genus of Heliorestis which has been isolated from lake sediments from the Lake El Hamra from Wadi El Natrun in Egypt.
