= Proteiniphilum saccharofermentans =

Scientific classification
- Domain: Bacteria
- Kingdom: Pseudomonadati
- Phylum: Bacteroidota
- Class: Bacteroidia
- Order: Bacteroidales
- Family: Dysgonomonadaceae
- Genus: Proteiniphilum
- Species: P. saccharofermentans

Binomial name
- Proteiniphilum saccharofermentans Hahnke et al. 2016

Type strain
- CECT 8610, DSM 28694, LMG 28299

Species of bacterium

Proteiniphilum saccharofermentans is a Gram-negative and facultatively anaerobic bacterium from the genus of Proteiniphilum which has been isolated from a mesophilic laboratory-scale biogas reactor.
