= Proteiniphilum =

Scientific classification
- Domain: Bacteria
- Kingdom: Pseudomonadati
- Phylum: Bacteroidota
- Class: Bacteroidia
- Order: Bacteroidales
- Family: Dysgonomonadaceae
- Genus: Proteiniphilum; Chen and Dong 2005

Species
- P. acetatigenes; P. saccharofermentans

Synonyms
- Peptophilum

Genus of bacteria

Proteiniphilum is a Gram-negative, obligately anaerobic, proteolytic and chemoorganotrophic genus from the family of Dysgonomonadaceae.
