= Methanothermus fervidus =

Scientific classification
- Domain: Archaea
- Kingdom: Methanobacteriati
- Phylum: Methanobacteriota
- Class: Methanobacteria
- Order: Methanobacteriales
- Family: Methanothermaceae
- Genus: Methanothermus
- Species: M. fervidus

Binomial name
- Methanothermus fervidus Stetter et al., 1981

Species of archaeon

Methanothermus fervidus is a species of methanogen. It is notable for being extremely thermophilic. Its cells are rod-shaped; its complex cell envelope exhibits two layers, each about 12 nm thick; the inner represents the pseudomurein sacculus and the outer a protein envelope. The type strain is Methanothermus fervidus Stetter 1982. The cells are motile, strictly anaerobic and stain Gram positive. They can grow at temperatures as high as 97 °C. Strain V24S^{T} can subsist on carbon dioxide and hydrogen alone. Its genome is 1,243,342 bp in length.
