= Dysgonomonas gadei =

Scientific classification
- Domain: Bacteria
- Kingdom: Pseudomonadati
- Phylum: Bacteroidota
- Class: Bacteroidia
- Order: Bacteroidales
- Genus: Dysgonomonadaceae
- Genus: Dysgonomonas
- Species: D. gadei

Binomial name
- Dysgonomonas gadei Hofstad et al. 2000

Type strain
- ATCC BAA-286, CCUG 42882, CIP 106420, Hofstad 1145589, JCM 16698

Species of bacterium

Dysgonomonas gadei is a Gram-negative and facultatively anaerobic bacterium from the genus Dysgonomonas which has been isolated from a gall bladder from a patient in Bergen in Norway.
