= Hydrogenovibrio crunogenus =

Scientific classification
- Domain: Bacteria
- Kingdom: Pseudomonadati
- Phylum: Pseudomonadota
- Class: Gammaproteobacteria
- Order: Thiotrichales
- Family: Piscirickettsiaceae
- Genus: Hydrogenovibrio
- Species: H. crunogenus

Binomial name
- Hydrogenovibrio crunogenus (Jannasch et al. 1985) Boden et al. 2017

Synonyms
- Thiomicrospira crunogena Jannasch et al. 1985

Species of bacterium

Hydrogenovibrio crunogenus (basionym Thiomicrospira crunogena) is a colorless, sulfur-oxidizing bacterium first isolated from a deep-sea hydrothermal vent. It is an obligate chemolithoautotrophic sulfur oxidizer and differs from other species of this genus by its DNA base composition and by its growth rate and optimal pH in thiosulfate medium. ATCC 35932^{T} (=LMD 84.00^{T}) is the type strain of the species. It was originally published in the genus Thiomicrospira as Thiomicrospira crunogena but was reclassified to the genus Hydrogenovibrio in 2017, resulting a grammatical gender change of the specific epithet from crunogena to crunogenus. The genome sequence of H. crunogenus XCL-2 has been published but that of the type strain has not yet been undertaken.
