= Heliorestis =

Scientific classification
- Domain: Bacteria
- Kingdom: Bacillati
- Phylum: Bacillota
- Class: Clostridia
- Order: Heliobacteriales
- Family: Heliobacteriaceae
- Genus: Heliorestis; Bryantseva et al. 2000

Type species
- Heliorestis daurensis Bryantseva et al. 2000

Species
- H. acidaminivorans; H. baculata; H. convulata; H. daurensis

Genus of bacteria

Heliorestis is an alkaliphilic genus of bacteria from the family of Heliobacteriaceae.

== Phylogeny ==
The currently accepted taxonomy is based on the List of Prokaryotic names with Standing in Nomenclature (LPSN) and National Center for Biotechnology Information (NCBI).

16S rRNA based LTP_10_2024

- Heliorestis
  - H. convulata Asao et al. 2021
  - - H. daurensis Bryantseva et al. 2000
    - - H. acidaminivorans Asao, Takaichi & Madigan 2021
      - H. baculata Bryantseva et al. 2001

120 marker proteins based GTDB 10-RS226

- Heliorestis
  - H. acidaminivorans
  - H. convulata

== See also ==
- List of bacterial orders
- List of bacteria genera
