= Water-activated battery =

Battery activated by water

A water-activated battery is a disposable reserve battery that does not contain an electrolyte and hence produces no voltage until it is soaked in water for several minutes.

== Description ==
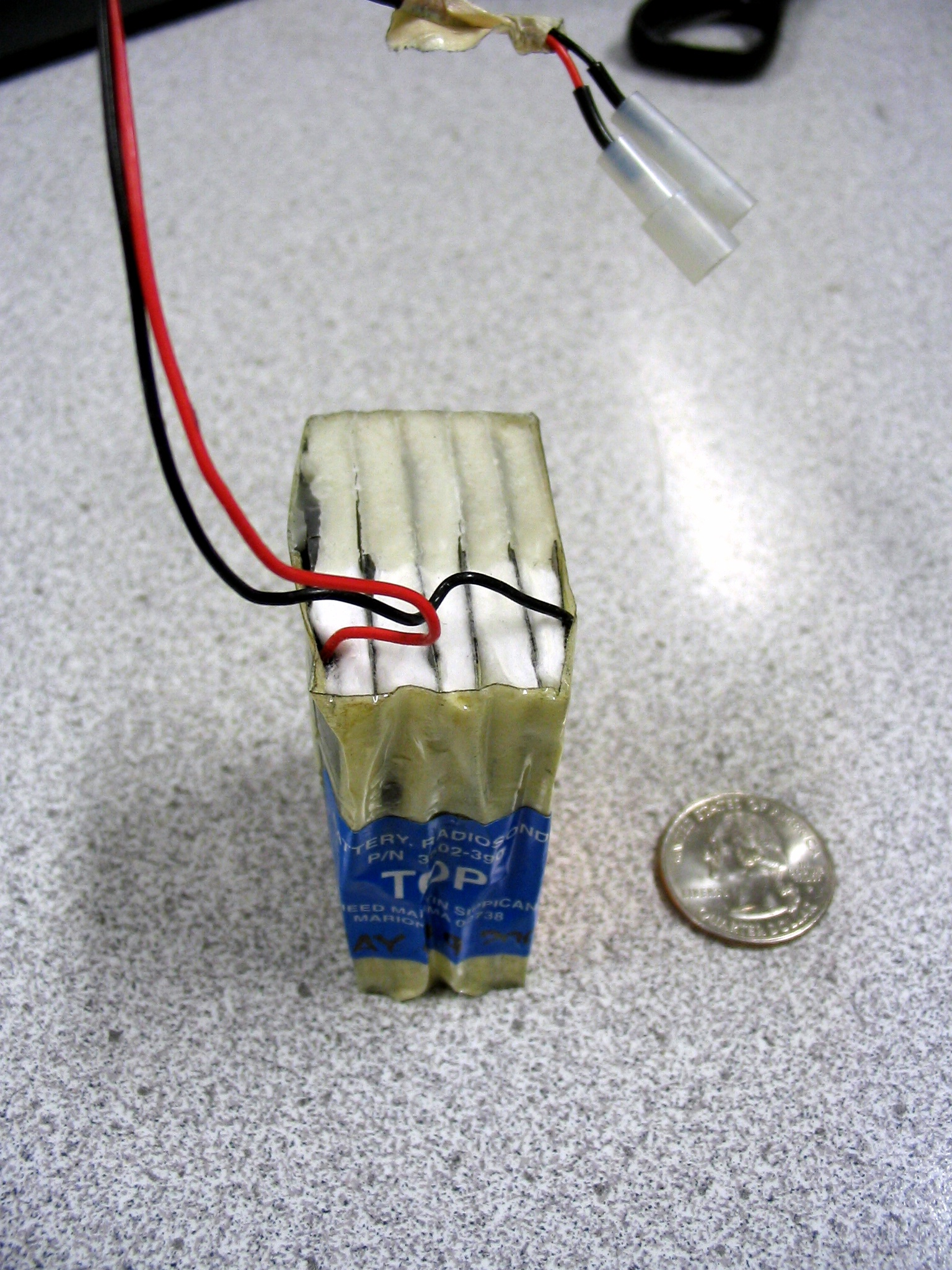
Side-view of water-activated radiosonde battery

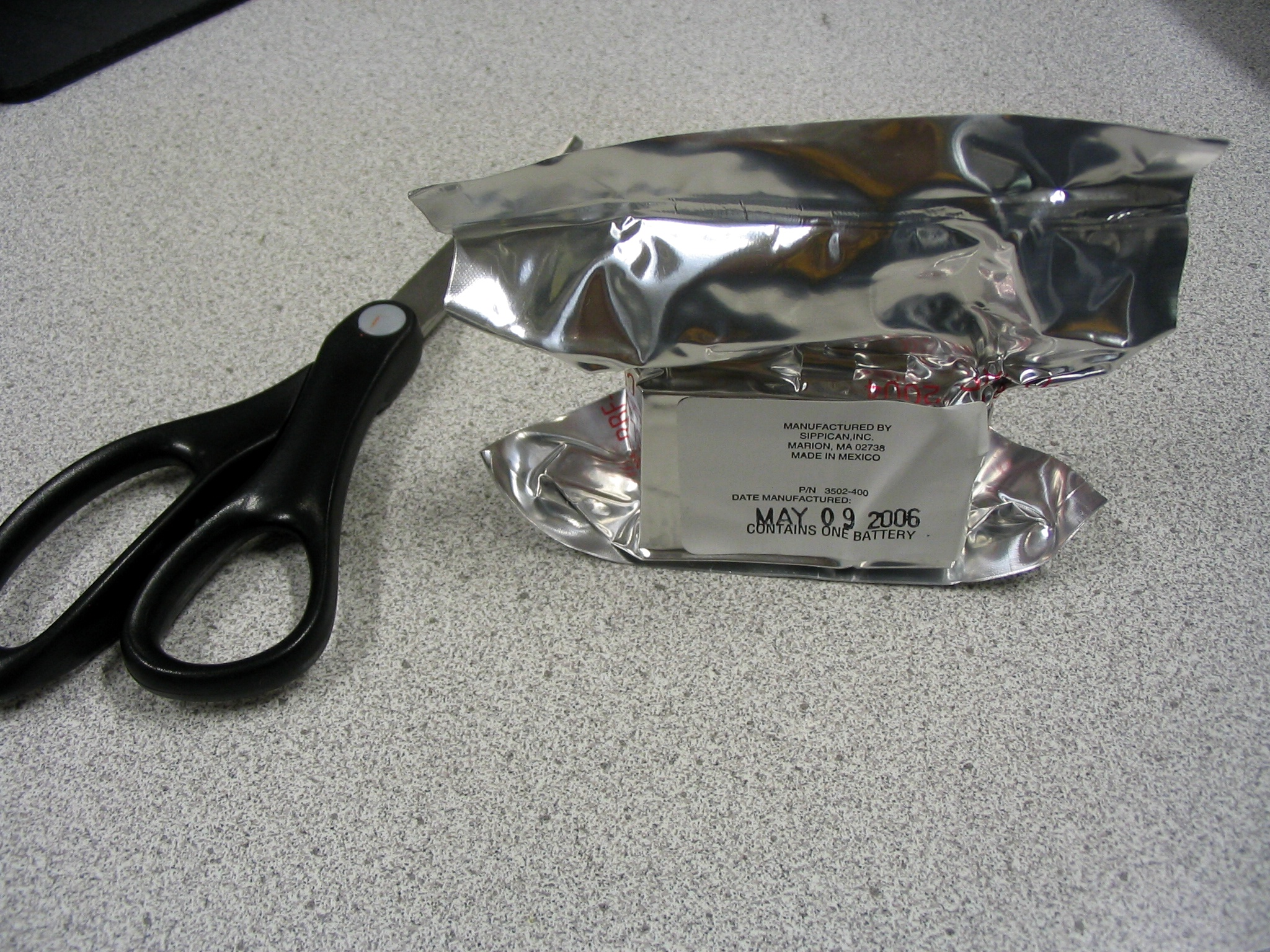
Radiosonde battery still in protective wrapper

Typically, a large variety of aqueous solutions can be used in place of plain water. This battery type is specifically designed to pollute less (see environmentally friendly claims) due to the lesser use or the absence of heavy metals. Water-activated batteries have been used in radiosondes, which shouldn't contain heavy metals since they regularly fall to the ground or ocean surface and indefinitely remain there.

Kits using copper-magnesium cells activated by water or the liquid sample itself are also in development. Another water-activated battery had been invented by Susumu Suzuki of Total System Conductor. Aluminium anodes are used on many water-activated batteries designed for use with salt water such as seawater. The HydroPak uses water-activated disposable fuel cartridges as an alternative to lead acid battery packs and portable generators. It uses water added to sodium borohydride which releases hydrogen fuel for a proton exchange membrane fuel cell. It can be re-charged simply by replacing the fuel cartridge rather than the lengthy recharging that other batteries require, however the cartridges cost $20 each.

== Activated Carbon ==
Activated carbon (AC) has been used to produce water-activated batteries. AC has a high surface area and adsorption capacity, enabling it to be produced from almost all carbon-rich and inexpensive precursors (such as wood) by physical or chemical activation. Its abundance and low cost have made it a popular mechanism for many uses, and a promising sustainable energy resource.

AC powder can serve as the anode of a water-activated battery. The AC powder is loaded into the anode compartment of a battery, which is separated from the cathode by a proton exchange membrane. When water is injected into the anode compartment, significant electric power is generated. This can be used to create a paper-based water-activated battery, which uses AC powder to generate electricity.

== See also ==
- List of battery types
- Lemon battery
- Earth battery
- Seawater-activated battery
