= Fermentimonas =

Scientific classification
- Domain: Bacteria
- Kingdom: Pseudomonadati
- Phylum: Bacteroidota
- Class: Bacteroidia
- Order: Bacteroidales
- Family: Dysgonomonadaceae
- Genus: Fermentimonas; Hahnke et al. 2016

Type species
- Fermentimonas caenicola

Species
- F. caenicola

Genus of bacteria

Fermentimonas is a genus from the family of Dysgonomonadaceae, with one known species (Fermentimonas caenicola).
