= Dysgonomonas mossii =

Scientific classification
- Domain: Bacteria
- Kingdom: Pseudomonadati
- Phylum: Bacteroidota
- Class: Bacteroidia
- Order: Bacteroidales
- Genus: Dysgonomonadaceae
- Genus: Dysgonomonas
- Species: D. mossii

Binomial name
- Dysgonomonas mossii Lawson et al. 2002

Type strain
- CCUG 43457, CDC F9489, CIP 107079, JCM 16699

Species of bacterium

Dysgonomonas mossii is a Gram-negative and facultatively anaerobic bacterium from the genus Dysgonomonas which has been isolated from an abdominal drainage from a human from the Holy Cross Hospital in Detroit in the United States.
