= Dysgonomonas =

Scientific classification
- Domain: Bacteria
- Kingdom: Pseudomonadati
- Phylum: Bacteroidota
- Class: Bacteroidia
- Order: Bacteroidales
- Family: Dysgonomonadaceae
- Genus: Dysgonomonas; Hofstad et al. 2000

Type species
- Dysgonomonas gadei

Species
- Dysgonomonas alginatilytica Dysgonomonas capnocytophagoides Dysgonomonas gadei Dysgonomonas hofstadii Dysgonomonas macrotermitis Dysgonomonas mossii Dysgonomonas oryzarvi Dysgonomonas termitidis

Genus of bacteria

Dysgonomonas is a Gram-negative and facultatively anaerobic genus from the family Dysgonomonadaceae which have been isolated from human sources. Dysgonomonas bacteria can cause gastroenteritis in immunocompromised persons
