= Methanothermus =

Scientific classification
- Domain: Archaea
- Kingdom: Methanobacteriati
- Phylum: Methanobacteriota
- Class: Methanobacteria
- Order: Methanobacteriales
- Family: Methanothermaceae
- Genus: Methanothermus; Stetter et al. 1982

Type species
- Methanothermus fervidus Stetter et al. 1982

Species
- M. fervidus; "M. jannaschii"; M. sociabilis

Genus of archaea

Methanothermus is a genus of microbes within the family Methanothermaceae. The species within this genes are hyperthermophiles and strictly anaerobic. They produce energy through the reduction of carbon dioxide with hydrogen to produce methane. it is found in hydrothermal vents with temperatures as high as 85 °C and pH 6.5.

== Phylogeny ==
The currently accepted taxonomy is based on the List of Prokaryotic names with Standing in Nomenclature (LPSN) and National Center for Biotechnology Information (NCBI).

16S rRNA based LTP_07_2026

- Methanothermus
  - M. fervidus Stetter et al. 1982
  - M. sociabilis Stetter 1986

53 marker proteins based GTDB 11-RS232

- Methanothermus
  M. fervidus

== See also ==
- List of Archaea genera
