= Desulfovibrio paquesii =

Scientific classification
- Domain: Bacteria
- Kingdom: Pseudomonadati
- Phylum: Thermodesulfobacteriota
- Class: Desulfovibrionia
- Order: Desulfovibrionales
- Family: Desulfovibrionaceae
- Genus: Desulfovibrio
- Species: D. paquesii

Binomial name
- Desulfovibrio paquesii van Houten et al. 2009

Species of bacterium

Desulfovibrio paquesii is a bacterium. It is sulfate-reducing and hydrogenotrophic. The type strain is SB1(T) (=DSM 16681(T)=JCM 14635(T)).
