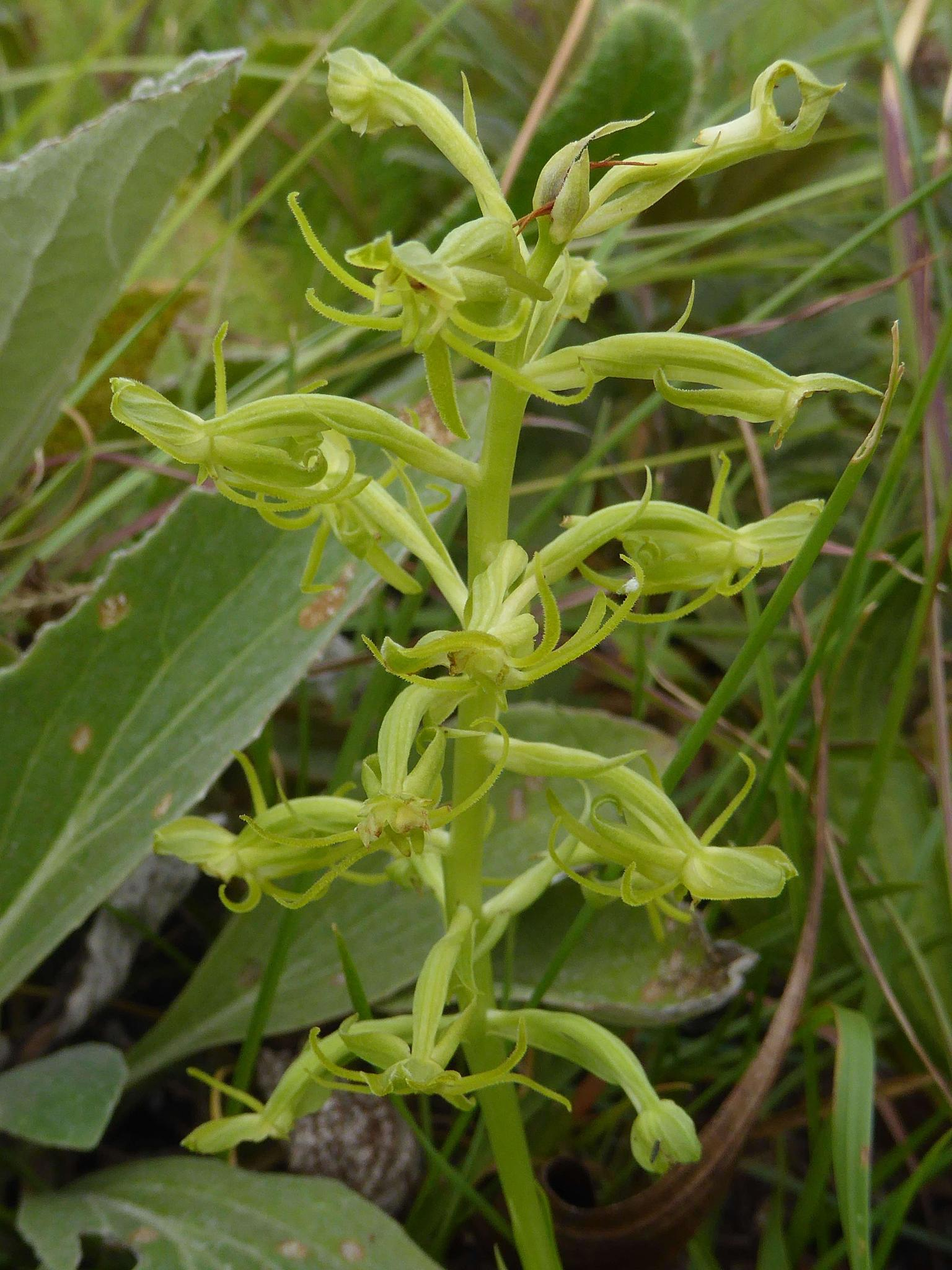

Conservation status
- Endangered (IUCN 3.1)
- CITES Appendix II

Scientific classification
- Kingdom: Plantae
- Clade: Tracheophytes
- Clade: Angiosperms
- Clade: Monocots
- Order: Asparagales
- Family: Orchidaceae
- Subfamily: Orchidoideae
- Genus: Habenaria
- Species: H. mossii

Binomial name
- Habenaria mossii (G.Will.) J.C.Manning

Synonyms
- Habenaria lithophila subsp. mossii G.Will.

= Habenaria mossii =

Species of flowering plant

Habenaria mossii is a species of plant in the family Orchidaceae. It is a tuberous geophyte endemic to eastern Gauteng and central Eastern Cape provinces of South Africa. Its natural habitat is Highveld (temperate high-elevation grassland). It is threatened by habitat loss.
