= Chemolithoautotroph =

Type of organism

A chemolithoautotroph, also known as a chemosynthetic organism, is an organism that performs chemosynthesis, meaning that it uses inorganic compounds as a source of chemical energy and electrons, and performs biological carbon fixation to increase its biomass, meaning that it uses inorganic sources of carbon (such as carbon dioxide) to generate its own nutrients for growth. They do not require organic compounds or light.

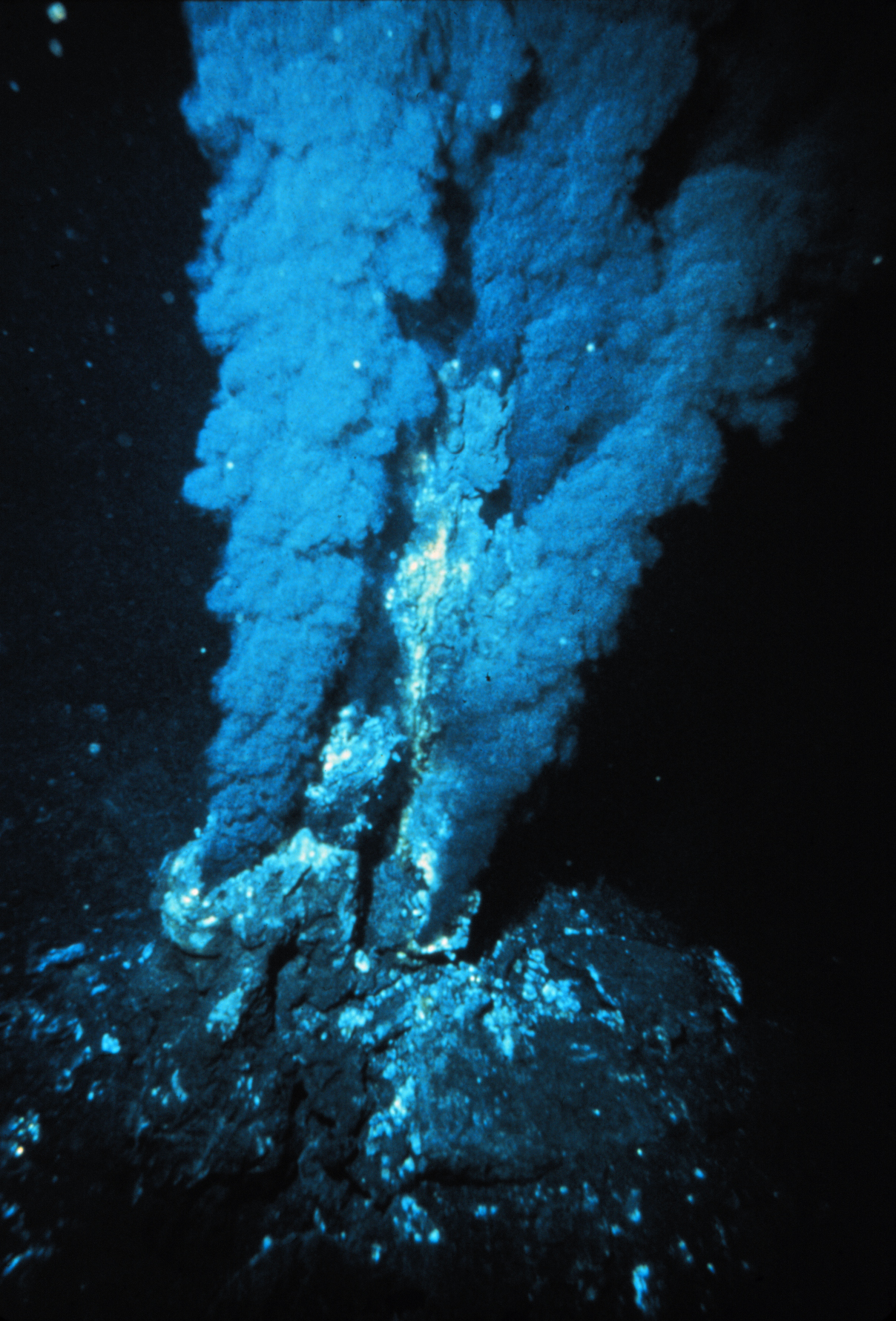
Hydrothermal vent in the Atlantic Ocean. These communities are abundant with chemolithoautotrophs.

== Overview ==
Depiction of the proton gradient generated by the electron transport chain.

Generation of ATP using the proton motive force.

== Metabolism and ecological role ==
Chemolithoautotrophs serve as primary producers for ecosystems with no access to sunlight, such as deep sea hydrothermal vents. Such organisms are also key players in the biogeochemical cycle of elements like iron, nitrogen, and sulfur. Organisms like the Acidithiobacillus genus, for example, are responsible for the acidification of their environment by oxidizing sulfur compounds into sulfuric acid (sulfate under physiological conditions). Their ecological role is vital for the availability of nutrients, and they have an influence on the atmospheric chemistry and ecosystem functioning of the environment; their energy-yielding reactions are important to extremophile environments. Organisms like denitrifying bacteria, such as Thiobacillus denitrificans, play a key role in bioremediation of groundwater by coupling oxidation of iron-sulfur compounds to nitrate respiration, decontaminating the environment from nitrate in the process.

== See also ==
- Acidophiles in acid mine drainage
- Anammox
- Comammox
- Desulfotignum phosphitoxidans
- Microbial metabolism
- Sulfate-reducing microorganism
