= Thiobacillus denitrificans =

Scientific classification
- Domain: Bacteria
- Kingdom: Pseudomonadati
- Phylum: Pseudomonadota
- Class: Betaproteobacteria
- Order: Nitrosomonadales
- Family: Thiobacillacaeae
- Genus: Thiobacillus
- Species: T. denitrificans

Binomial name
- Thiobacillus denitrificans (ex Beijerinck 1904) Kelly and Harrison 1989

Species of bacterium

Thiobacillus denitrificans is a Gram-negative, obligate chemolithoautotroph. It was originally discovered by Martinus Beijerinck in 1904.

== Metabolism ==
Thiobacillus denitrificans is particularly notable for its ability to oxidize sulfur and uranium compounds in a nitrate-dependent manner.

== Genetics ==
The genome of T. denitrificans has been sequenced. The genome is a single circular chromosome consisting of 2.9 Mbps and with a GC-content of 66.1%.
