= Methanothermaceae =

Scientific classification
- Domain: Archaea
- Kingdom: Methanobacteriati
- Phylum: Methanobacteriota
- Class: Methanobacteria
- Order: Methanobacteriales
- Family: Methanothermaceae; Stetter 1982

Genus
- Methanothermus

Family of archaea

Methanothermaceae are a family of microbes within the order Methanobacteriales.

== See also ==
- List of Archaea genera
