= Electrotroph =

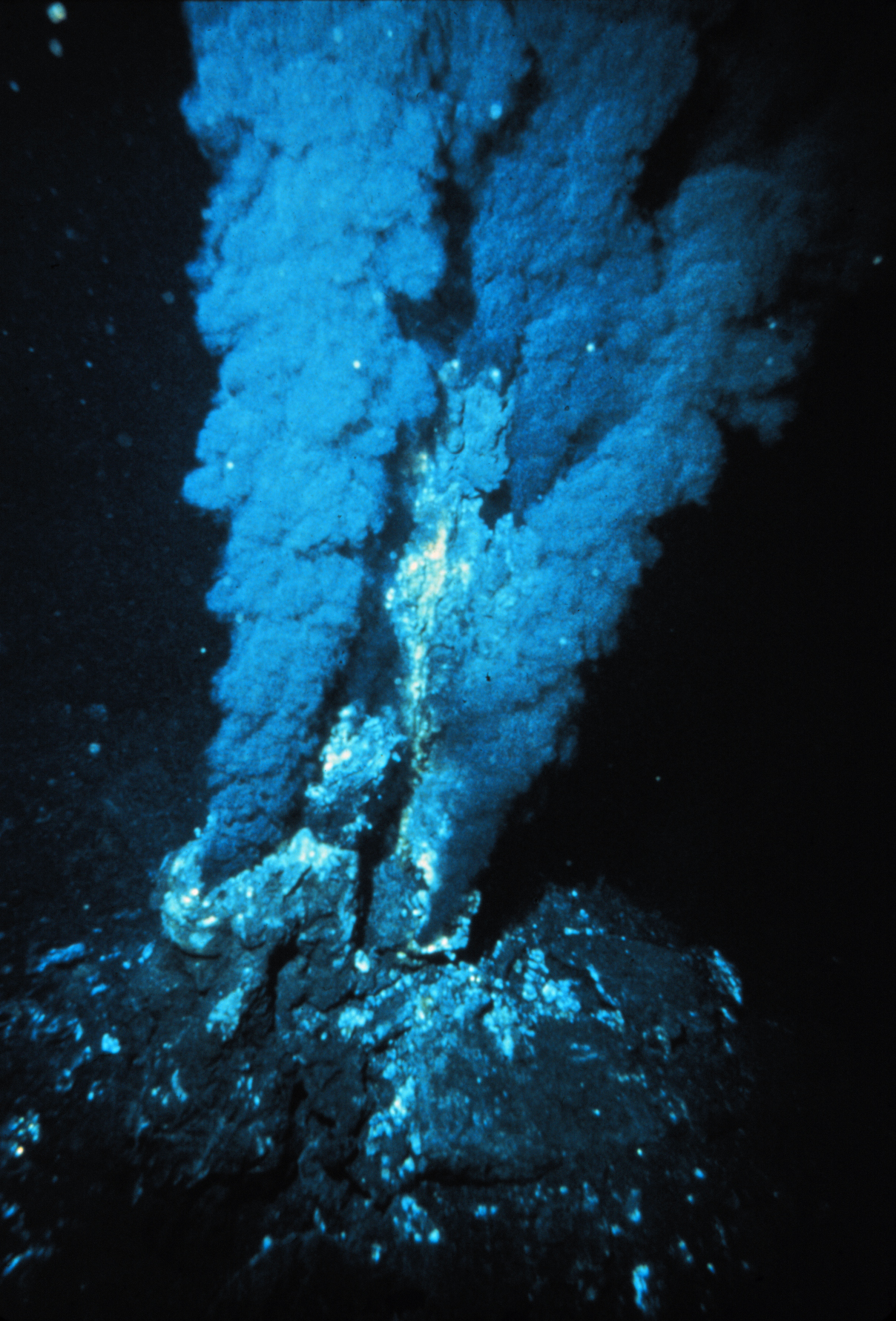
Blacksmoker thermal vent

An electrotroph is a microorganism which can receive electrons necessary for its growth from an electrode (power supply) terminal or other electron donors.

The chemolithoautotrophic bacterium Acidithiobacillus ferrooxidans, that lives in ocean thermal vents, has been shown to exhibit electrotrophic behavior in experiments. In particular, it switches the electron source for carbon assimilation from diffusible Fe^{2+} ions to an electrode under the condition that electrical current is the only source of energy and electrons.
