= Electrolithoautotroph =

Organism which feeds on electricity

An electrolithoautotroph is an organism which feeds on electricity. These organisms use electricity to convert carbon dioxide into organic matter by using electrons directly taken from solid-inorganic electron donors. Electrolithoautotrophs are microorganisms which are found in the deep crevices of the ocean. The warm, mineral-rich environment provides a rich source of nutrients. The electron source for carbon assimilation from diffusible Fe^{2+} ions to an electrode under the condition that electrical current is the only source of energy and electrons. Electrolithoautotrophs form a third metabolic pathway compared to photosynthesis (plants converting light into sugar) and chemosynthesis (bacteria converting chemical energy into food).
