= Heliobacteria =

Heliobacteriaceae

Scientific classification
- Domain: Bacteria
- Kingdom: Bacillati
- Phylum: Bacillota
- Class: Clostridia
- Order: Heliobacteriales
- Family: Heliobacteriaceae; Madigan & Asao 2010

Genera
- Heliobacterium; "Ca. Helioclostridium"; Heliomicrobium; "Ca. Heliomonas"; Heliophilum; Heliorestis

Family of bacteria

Heliobacteria are a unique subset of bacteria that process light for energy. Distinguishable from other phototrophic bacteria, they utilize a unique photosynthetic pigment, bacteriochlorophyll g and are the only known Gram-positive phototroph. They are a key player in symbiotic nitrogen fixation alongside plants, and use a type I reaction center like green-sulfur bacteria.

RNA trees place the heliobacteria among the Bacillota. They have no outer membrane and like certain other Bacillota (Clostridia), they form heat-resistant endospores, which contain high levels of calcium and dipicolinic acid. Heliobacteria are the only Bacillota known to be phototrophic.

== Metabolism ==
The heliobacteria are phototrophic: they convert light energy into chemical energy using a type I reaction center. The primary pigment involved is bacteriochlorophyll g, which is unique to the group and has a unique absorption spectrum; this gives the heliobacteria their own environmental niche. Phototrophic processes take place at the cell membrane, which does not form folds or compartments as it does in purple bacteria. Though heliobacteria are phototrophic, they can create energy without light using pyruvate fermentation, which generates significantly less energy than it could with light.

Heliobacteria are photoheterotrophic, requiring organic carbon sources, and they are exclusively anaerobic. Bacteriochlorophyll g is inactivated by the presence of oxygen, making them obligate anaerobes (they cannot survive in aerobic conditions). Heliobacteria have been found in soils, hot springs, soda lakes and are common in the waterlogged soils of paddy fields. They are avid nitrogen fixers, so are probably important in the fertility of paddy fields. Heliobacteria are mainly terrestrial phototrophs, contrary to the multitudes of others that are aquatic, and often form mutualistic relationships with the plants near them.

== Taxonomy ==
Heliobacteria should not be confused with Helicobacter, which is a genus of bacteria with quite different characteristics.

The currently accepted taxonomy is based on the List of Prokaryotic names with Standing in Nomenclature (LPSN) and National Center for Biotechnology Information (NCBI).

16S rRNA based LTP_10_2024

- Heliobacteriaceae
  - Heliorestis Bryantseva et al. 2000
  - - Heliophilum Ormerod et al. 1996
    - - Heliobacterium Gest and Favinger 1985
      - Heliomicrobium Kyndt et al. 2021

120 marker proteins based GTDB 10-RS226

- Heliobacteriaceae
  - Heliorestis
  - - Heliophilum
    - - Heliobacterium [incl. Heliobacillus Beer-Romero & Gest 1998]
      - Heliomicrobium

== See also ==
- List of bacterial orders
- List of bacteria genera
