= Dysgonomonadaceae =

Scientific classification
- Domain: Bacteria
- Kingdom: Pseudomonadati
- Phylum: Bacteroidota
- Class: Bacteroidia
- Order: Bacteroidales
- Family: Dysgonomonadaceae; García-López et al. 2020

Genera
- Dysgonomonas Hofstad et al. 2000; Fermentimonas Hahnke et al. 2016; Petrimonas Grabowski et al. 2005; Proteiniphilum Chen and Dong 2005; Seramator Liu et al. 2020

Synonyms
- "Dysgonomonadaceae" Ormerod et al. 2016

Family of bacteria

Dysgonomonadaceae is a family of gram-negative bacteria.
