= Marble =

Type of metamorphic rock

- Metamorphic rock
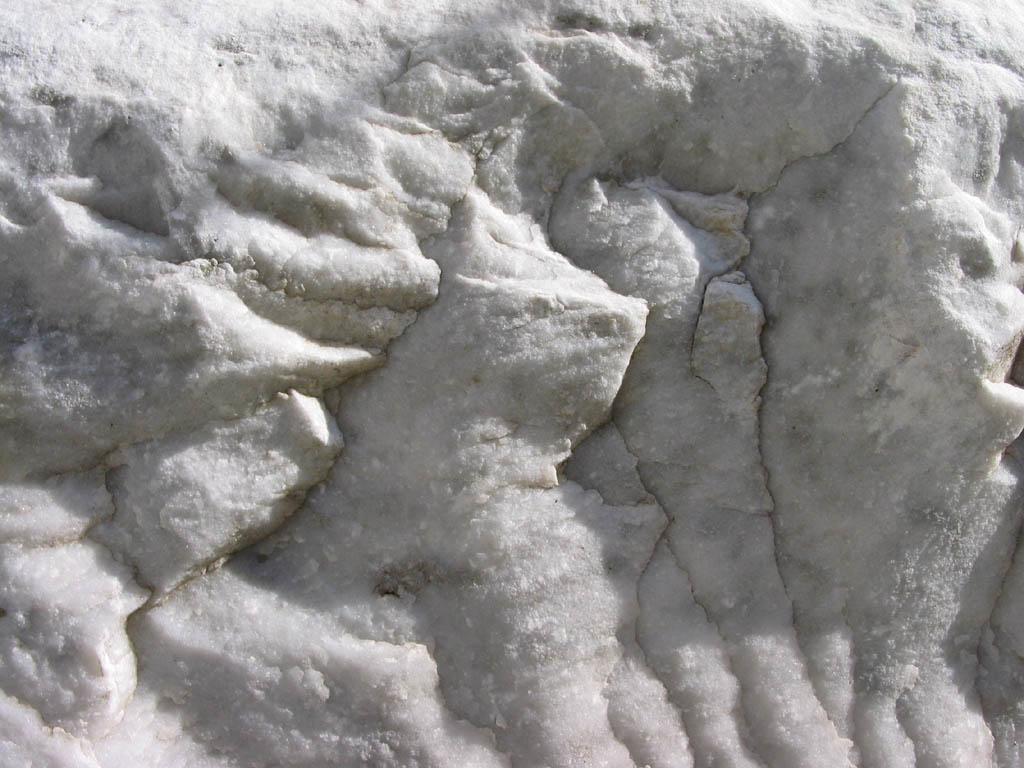
- Marble

Composition
- Mostly calcite or dolomite

Physical Characteristics
- Fabric: Typically not foliated

Relationships
- Protoliths: carbonate minerals, limestone, dolomite

Marble is a metamorphic rock consisting of carbonate minerals, most commonly calcite (CaCO_{3}) or dolomite (CaMg(CO_{3})_{2}), that have recrystallized under the influence of heat and pressure. It has a crystalline texture, and is typically not foliated (layered), although there are exceptions.

In geology, the term marble refers to metamorphosed limestone, but its use in stonemasonry more broadly encompasses unmetamorphosed limestone.

Pure white marble arises from very clean limestone or from dolomite rock. However, its signature veins and swirls result from impurities, for example clay, sand, iron oxides, or chert that were originally present in the protolith—magnesium-rich varieties may show green tones due to serpentine. These impurities are redistributed and recrystallized during metamorphism. Due to its hardness, durability and resistance to temperature, marble is often used in sculpture and construction. In sculpture, marble is ideal for fine detail due to its uniform grain, moderate hardness, and ability to scatter light beneath the surface (subsurface scattering), lending the sculpture a lifelike, waxy appearance. In architecture marble is valued for its polishable surface, hardness, and wear resistance. In stonemasonry, "marble" may broadly include similar crystalline rocks, even if not true geological marble.

The extraction of marble is performed by quarrying. Marble production is dominated by four countries: China, Italy, India and Spain, which account for almost half of world production of marble and decorative stone.

== Etymology ==
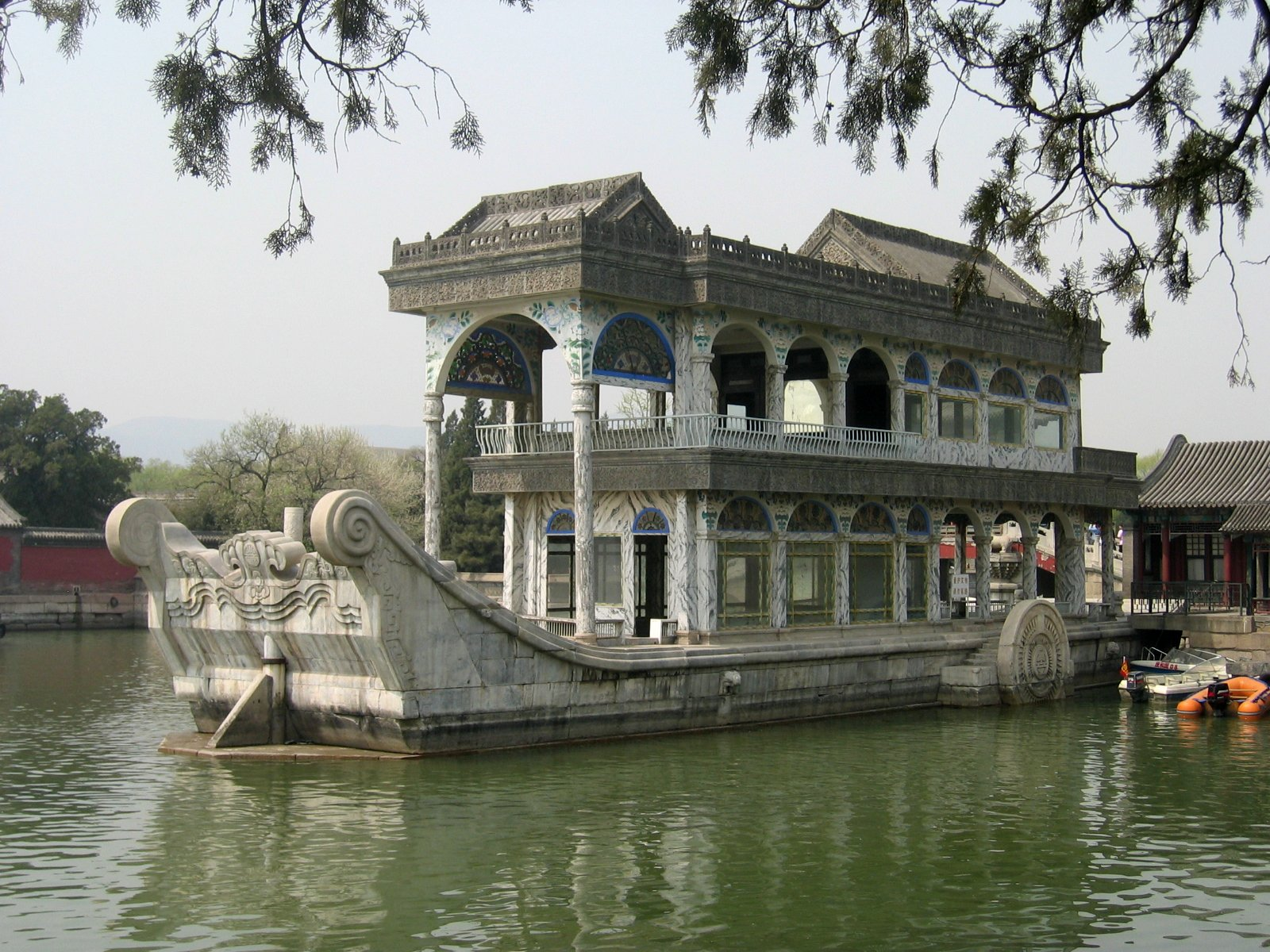
The Marble Boat, a lakeside pavilion in the Summer Palace in Beijing, China

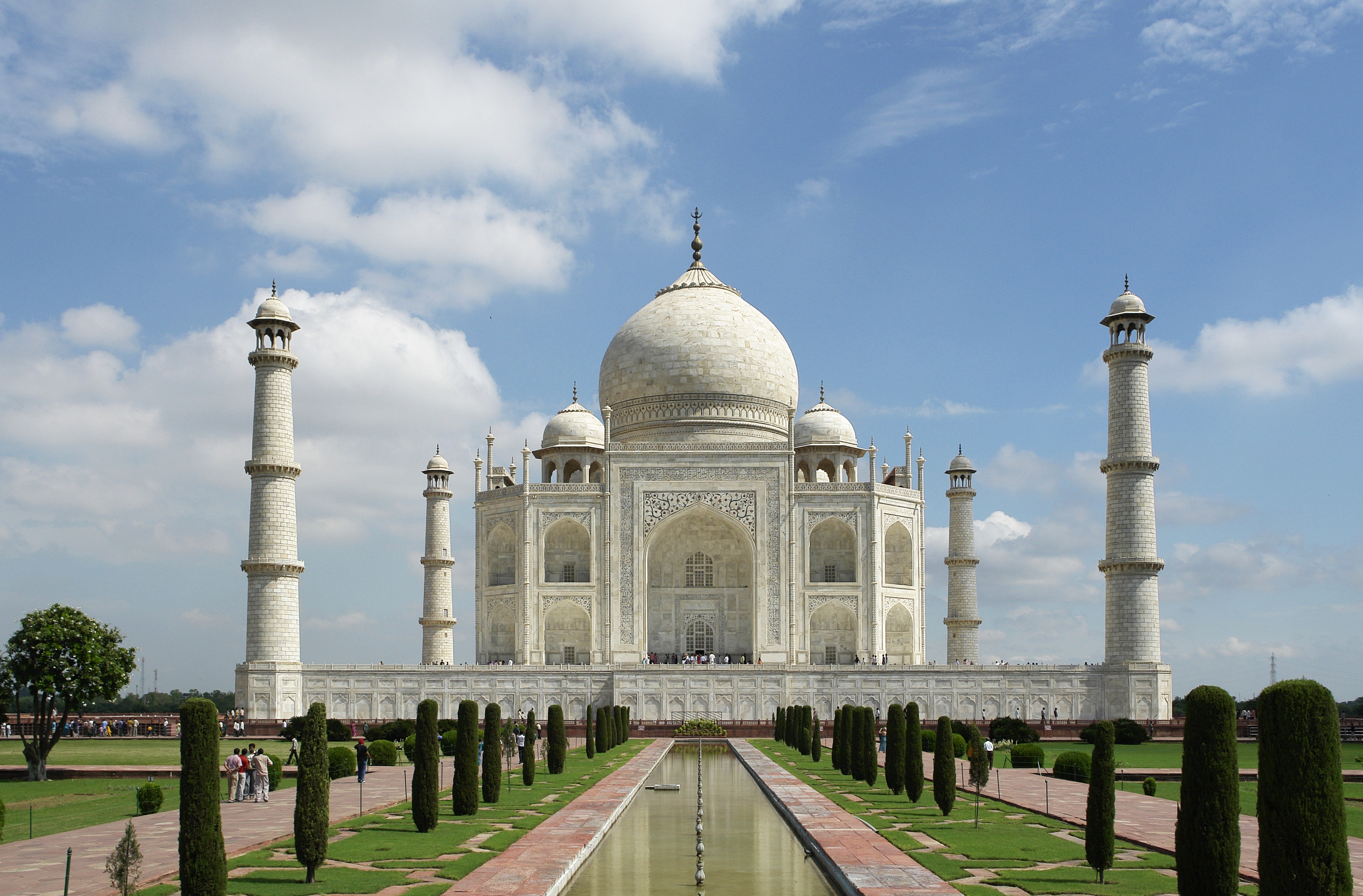
The Taj Mahal is clad entirely in marble

The word "marble" derives from the Ancient Greek μάρμαρον (mármaron), from μάρμαρος (mármaros), "crystalline rock, shining stone", perhaps from the verb μαρμαίρω (marmaírō), "to flash, sparkle, gleam"; R. S. P. Beekes has suggested that a "Pre-Greek origin is probable".

This stem is also the ancestor of the English word "marmoreal", meaning "marble-like." While the English term "marble" resembles the French marbre, most other European languages (with words like "marmoreal") more closely resemble the original Ancient Greek.

== Geology ==
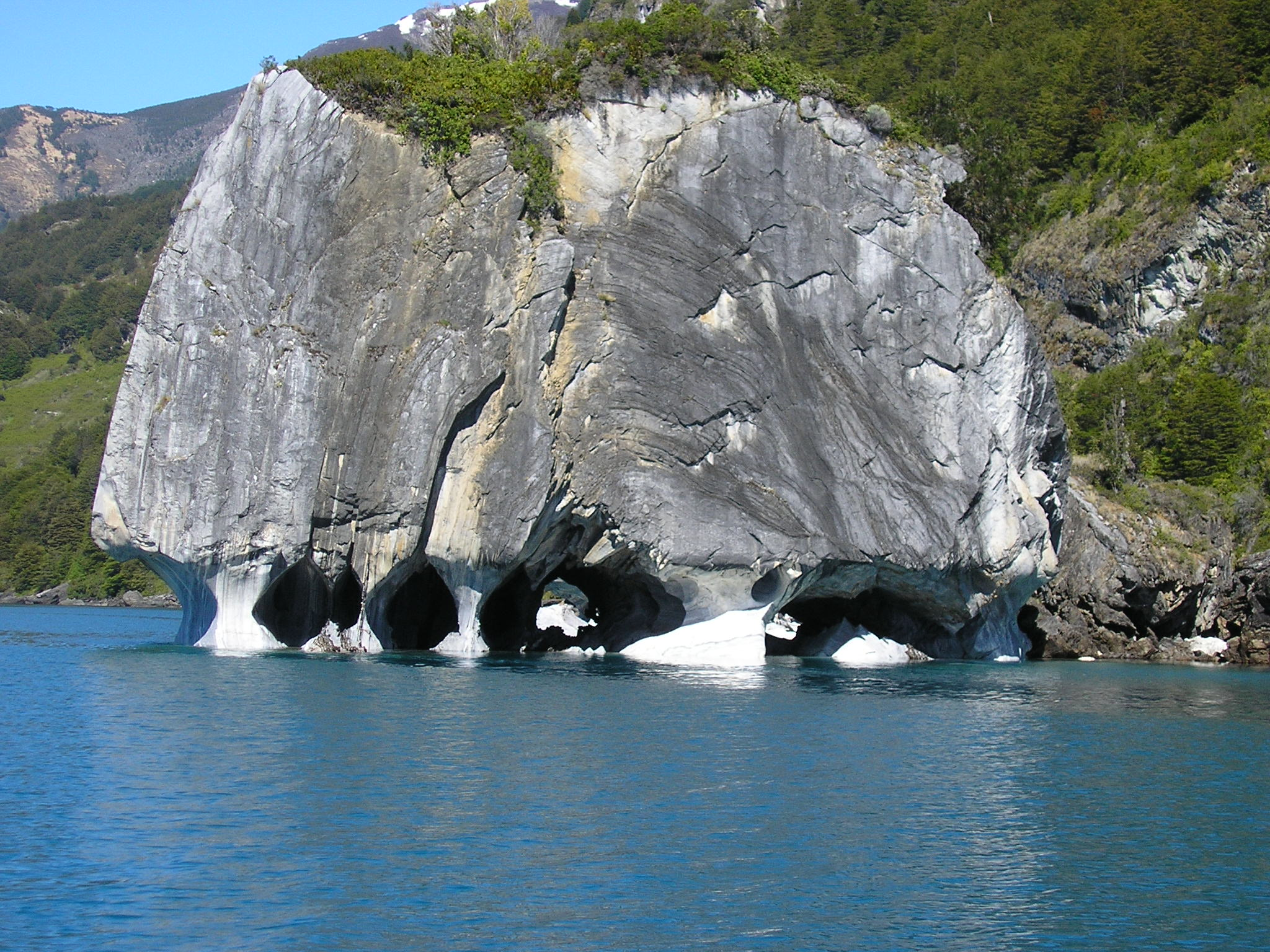
Folded and weathered marble at General Carrera Lake, Chile

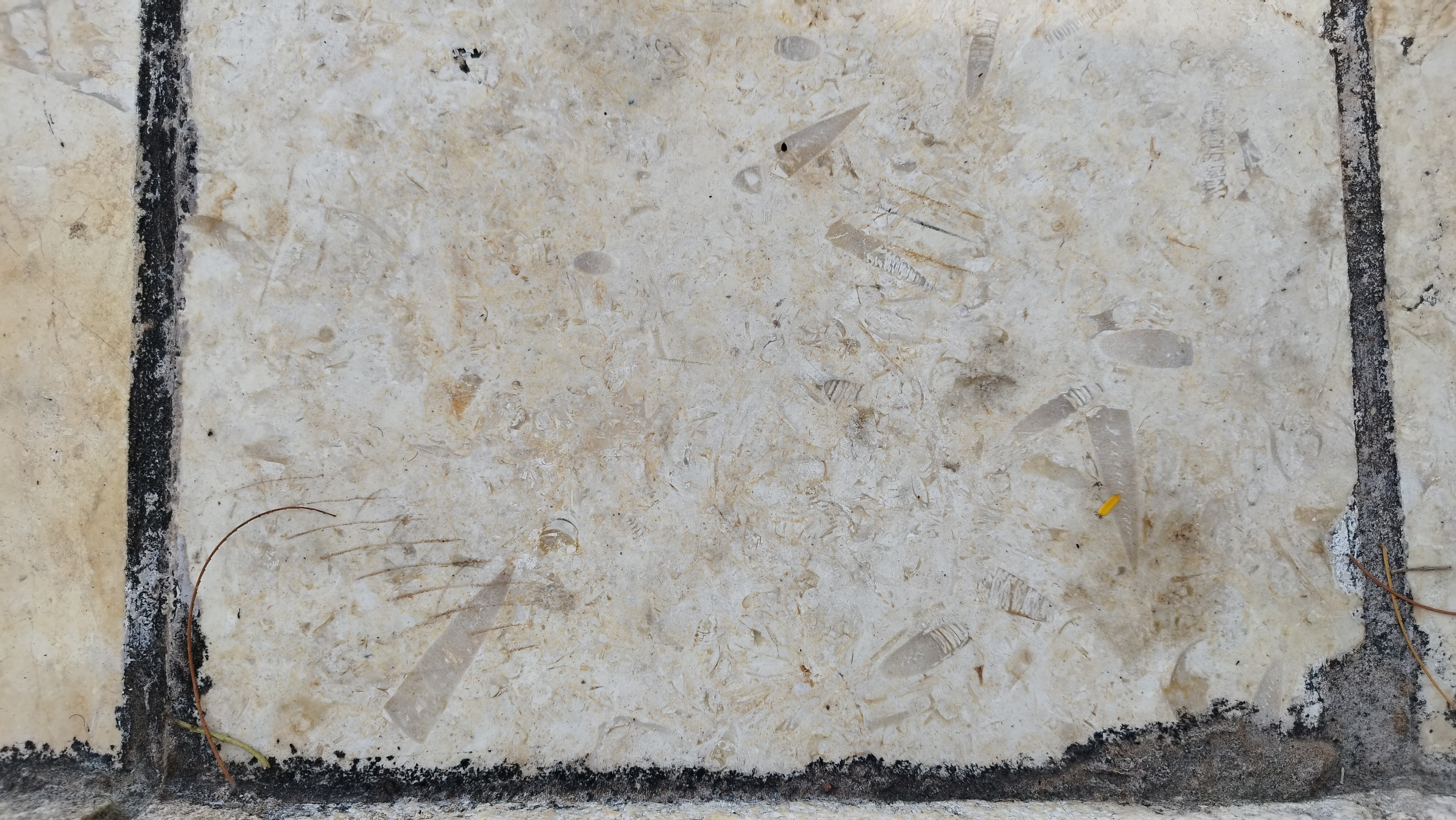
Fossils on Marble floor tile

Marble is a rock resulting from metamorphism of sedimentary carbonate rocks, most commonly limestone or dolomite. Metamorphism causes variable re-crystallization of the original carbonate mineral grains. The resulting marble rock is typically composed of an interlocking mosaic of carbonate crystals. Primary sedimentary textures and structures of the original carbonate rock (protolith) have typically been modified or destroyed.

Pure white marble is the result of metamorphism of a very pure (silicate-poor) limestone or dolomite protolith. The characteristic swirls and veins of many colored marble varieties, sometimes called striations, are usually due to various mineral impurities such as clay, silt, sand, iron oxides, or chert which were originally present as grains or layers in the limestone. Green coloration is often due to serpentine resulting from originally magnesium-rich limestone or dolomite with silica impurities. These various impurities have been mobilized and recrystallized by the intense pressure and heat of the metamorphism.

== Chemistry ==
=== Degradation by acids ===
Acids react with the calcium carbonate in marble, producing carbonic acid (which decomposes quickly to CO_{2} and H_{2}O) and other soluble salts :

CaCO_{3}(s) + 2H^{+}(aq) → Ca^{2+}(aq) + CO_{2}(g) + H_{2}O (l)

Outdoor marble statues, gravestones, or other marble structures are damaged by acid rain whether by carbonation, sulfation or the formation of "black-crust" (accumulation of calcium sulphate, nitrates and carbon particles). Vinegar and other acidic solutions should be avoided in the cleaning of marble products.

=== Crystallization ===
Crystallization refers to a method of imparting a glossy, more durable finish on to a marble floor (CaCO_{3}). It involves polishing the surface with an acidic solution and a steel wool pad on a flooring machine. The chemical reaction below shows a typical process using magnesium fluorosilicate (MgSiF_{6}) and hydrochloric acid (HCl) taking place.

CaCO_{3}(s) + MgSiF_{6}(l) + 2HCl (l) → MgCl_{2}(s) + CaSiF_{6}(s) + CO_{2}(g) + H_{2}O(l)

The resulting calcium hexafluorosilicate (CaSiF_{6}) is bonded to the surface of the marble. This is harder, more glossy and stain resistant compared to the original surface.

The other often used method of finishing marble is to polish with oxalic acid (H_{2}C_{2}O_{4}), an organic acid. The resulting reaction is as follows:

CaCO_{3}(s) + H_{2}C_{2}O_{4}(l) → CaC_{2}O_{4}(s) + CO_{2}(g) + H_{2}O(l)

In this case the calcium oxalate (CaC_{2}O_{4}) formed in the reaction is washed away with the slurry, leaving a surface that has not been chemically changed.

=== Microbial degradation ===
The haloalkaliphilic methylotrophic bacterium Methylophaga murata was isolated from deteriorating marble in the Kremlin. Bacterial and fungal degradation was detected in four samples of marble from Milan Cathedral; black Cladosporium attacked dried acrylic resin using melanin.

== Types and features ==
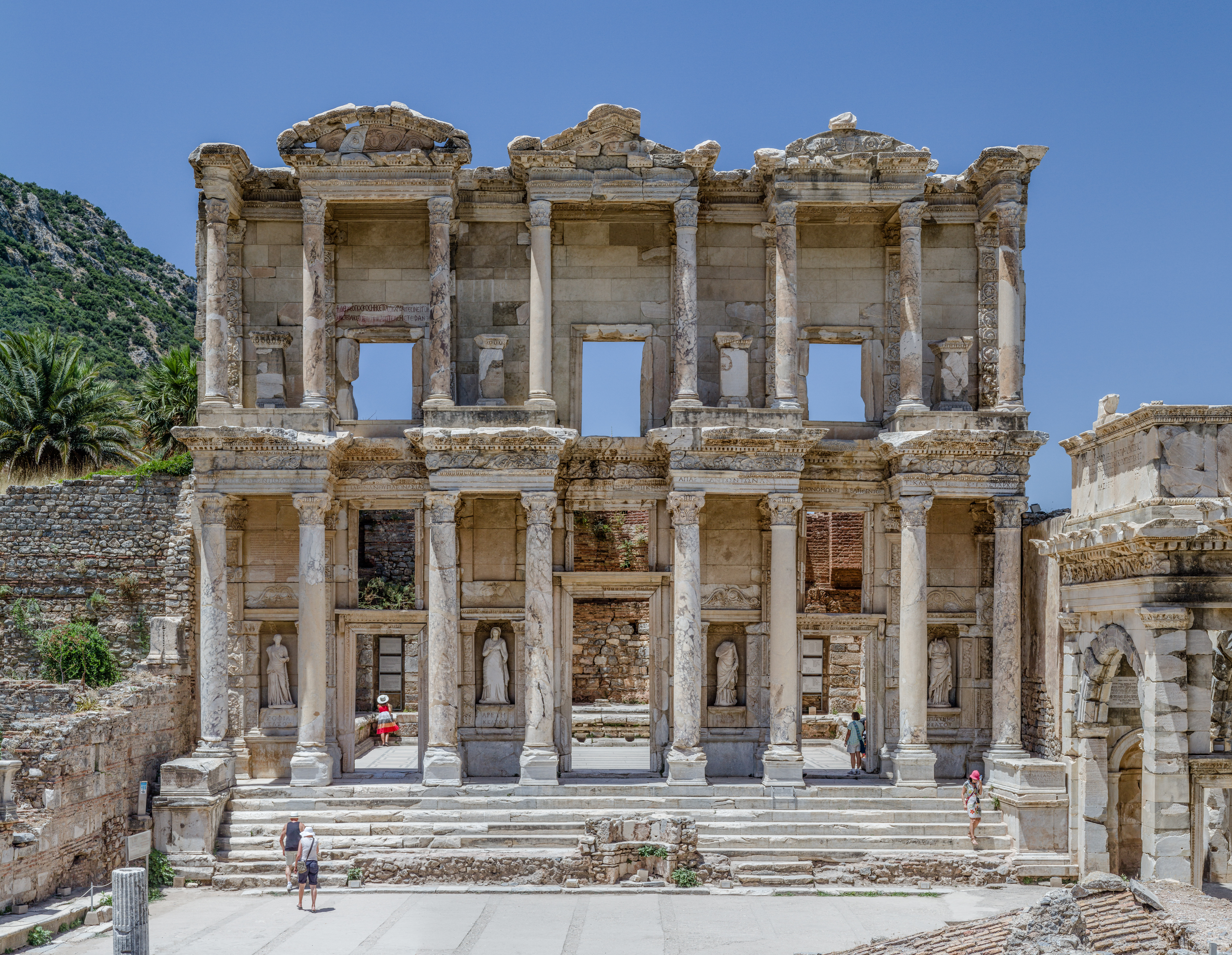
The Library of Celsus in Ephesus, Turkey. Turkey is the largest marble exporter in the world.

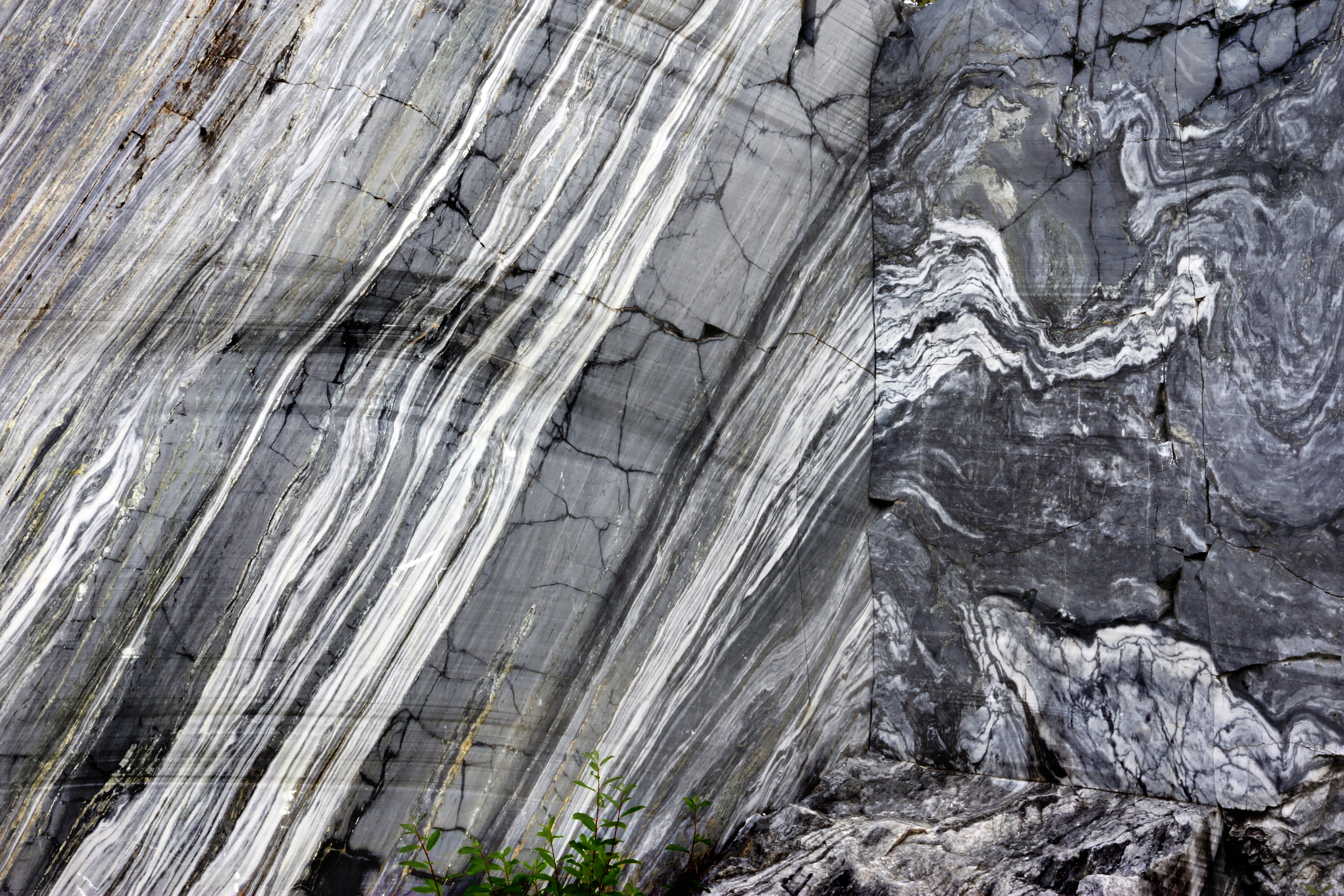
Marble wall of Ruskeala, Republic of Karelia, Russia

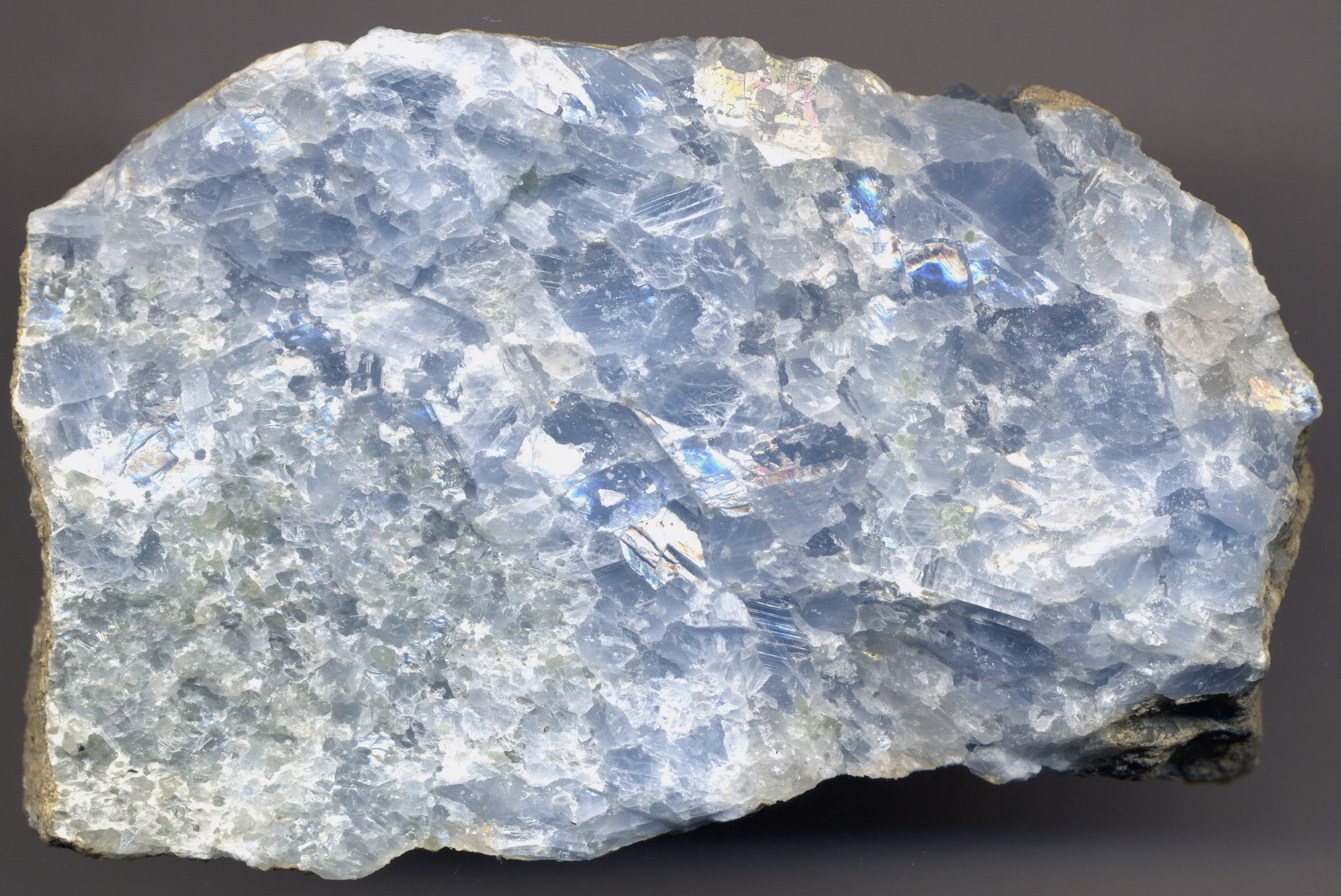
A piece of blue calcite marble from the Precambrian period in New York State, United States

=== Examples of notable marble varieties and locations ===
Marble	Color	Location	Country
Bianco Sivec	white	near Prilep (Прилеп), Pelagonia (Пелагониски)	North Macedonia
Carrara marble	white or blue-gray	Carrara, Tuscany	Italy
Statuario marble	white, golden, black	Carrara, Apuan Alps	Italy
Creole marble	white and blue/black	Pickens County, Georgia	United States
Etowah marble	pink, salmon, rose	Pickens County, Georgia	United States
Hanbaiyu marble	white	Quyang County, Hebei	China
Makrana marble	white	Makrana, Nagaur district, Rajasthan	India
Murphy marble	white	Pickens and Gilmer Counties, Georgia	United States
Nero Marquina marble	black	Markina-Xemein, Bizkaia, Basque County	Spain
Parian marble	pure-white, fine-grained	Island of Paros (Πάρος), South Aegean (Νοτίου Αιγαίου)	Greece
Pentelic marble	pure-white, fine-grained semitranslucent	Mount Pentelicus (Πεντελικό όρος), Attica (Ἀττική)	Greece
Prokonnesos marble	white	Marmara Island, Sea of Marmara	Turkey
Ruskeala marble	white	near Ruskeala (Рускеала), Karelia (Карелия)	Russia
Rușchița marble	white, pinkish, reddish	Poiana Ruscă Mountains, Caraș-Severin County	Romania
Swedish green marble	green	near Kolmården, Södermanland	Sweden
Sylacauga marble	white	Talladega County, Alabama	United States
Venčac marble	white	Venčac mountain near Aranđelovac	Serbia
Vermont marble	white	Proctor, Vermont	United States
Wunsiedel marble	white	Wunsiedel, Bavaria	Germany
Yule marble	uniform pure white	near Marble, Colorado	United States

=== Features ===
Marble is a rock composed of calcium and magnesium carbonate, mostly white and pink. Common marble varieties are granular limestone or dolomite. The hardness of marble is very high, because the internal structure of the rock is very uniform after long-term natural aging, and the internal stress disappears, so the marble will not be deformed due to temperature, and has strong wear resistance. It is a popular building material.

The following table is a summary of the features of marble.

Colour	White, Pink, Black etc
Texture	granular
Grain size	medium grained
Mineralogy	calcite
Hardness	hard
Other features	generally gritty to touch
Uses	building stone

== Uses ==
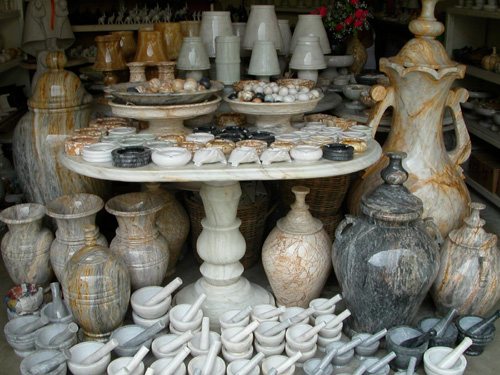
Marble products in Romblon, Philippines

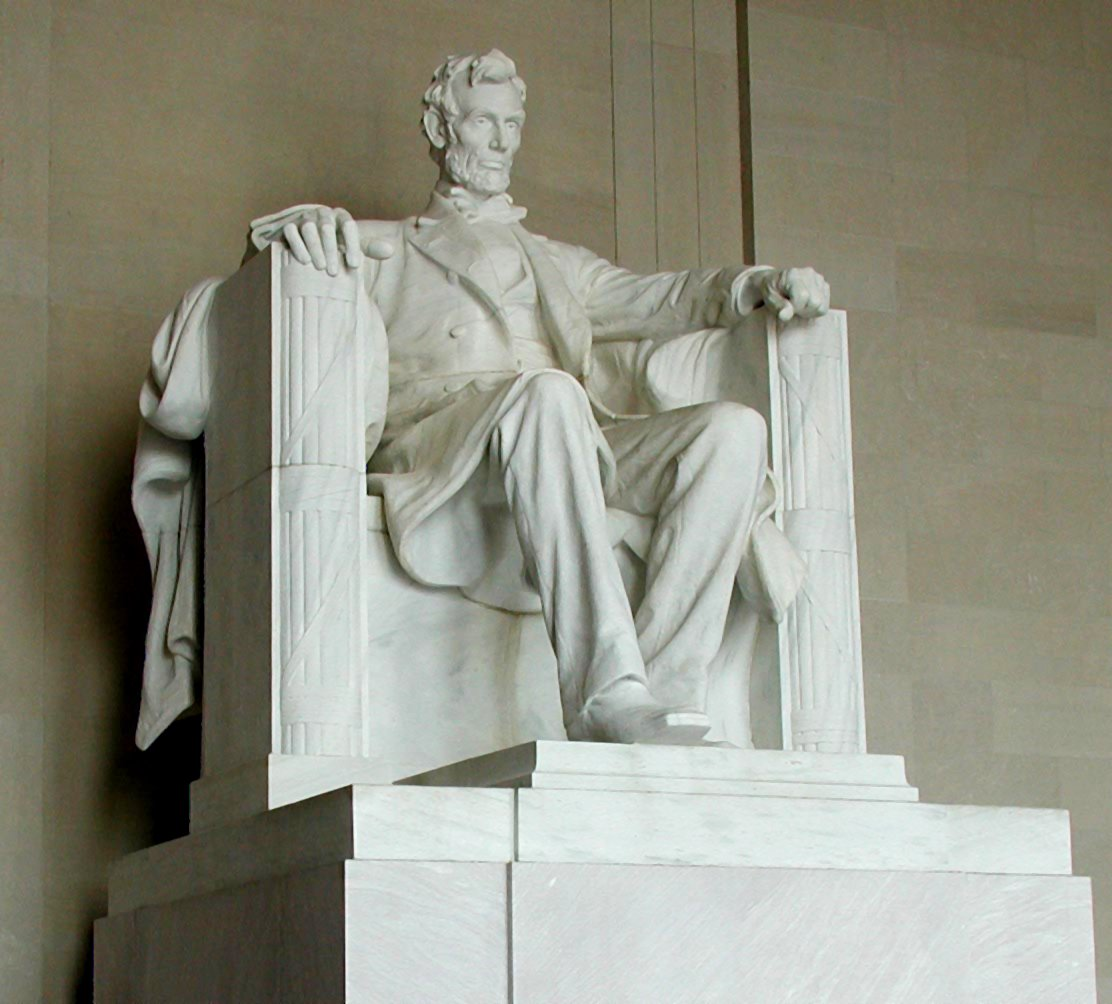
Statue of Abraham Lincoln (Lincoln Memorial) sculpted by Daniel Chester French from Georgia Marble in 1920

=== Sculpture ===
White marble has been prized for its use in sculptures since classical times. This preference has to do with its softness, which made it easier to carve, relative isotropy and homogeneity, and a relative resistance to shattering. Also, the low index of refraction of calcite allows light to penetrate 12.7 to 38 millimeters into the stone before being scattered out, resulting in the characteristic waxy look which brings a lifelike luster to marble sculptures of any kind, which is why many sculptors preferred and still prefer marble for sculpting the human form.

=== Construction ===
Construction marble is a stone which is composed of calcite, dolomite or serpentine that is capable of taking a polish. More generally in construction, specifically the dimension stone trade, the term marble is used for any crystalline calcitic rock (and some non-calcitic rocks) useful as building stone. For example, Tennessee marble is really a dense granular fossiliferous gray to pink to maroon Ordovician limestone, that geologists call the Holston Formation.

Ashgabat, the capital city of Turkmenistan, was recorded in the 2013 Guinness Book of Records as having the world's highest concentration of white marble buildings.

== Production ==
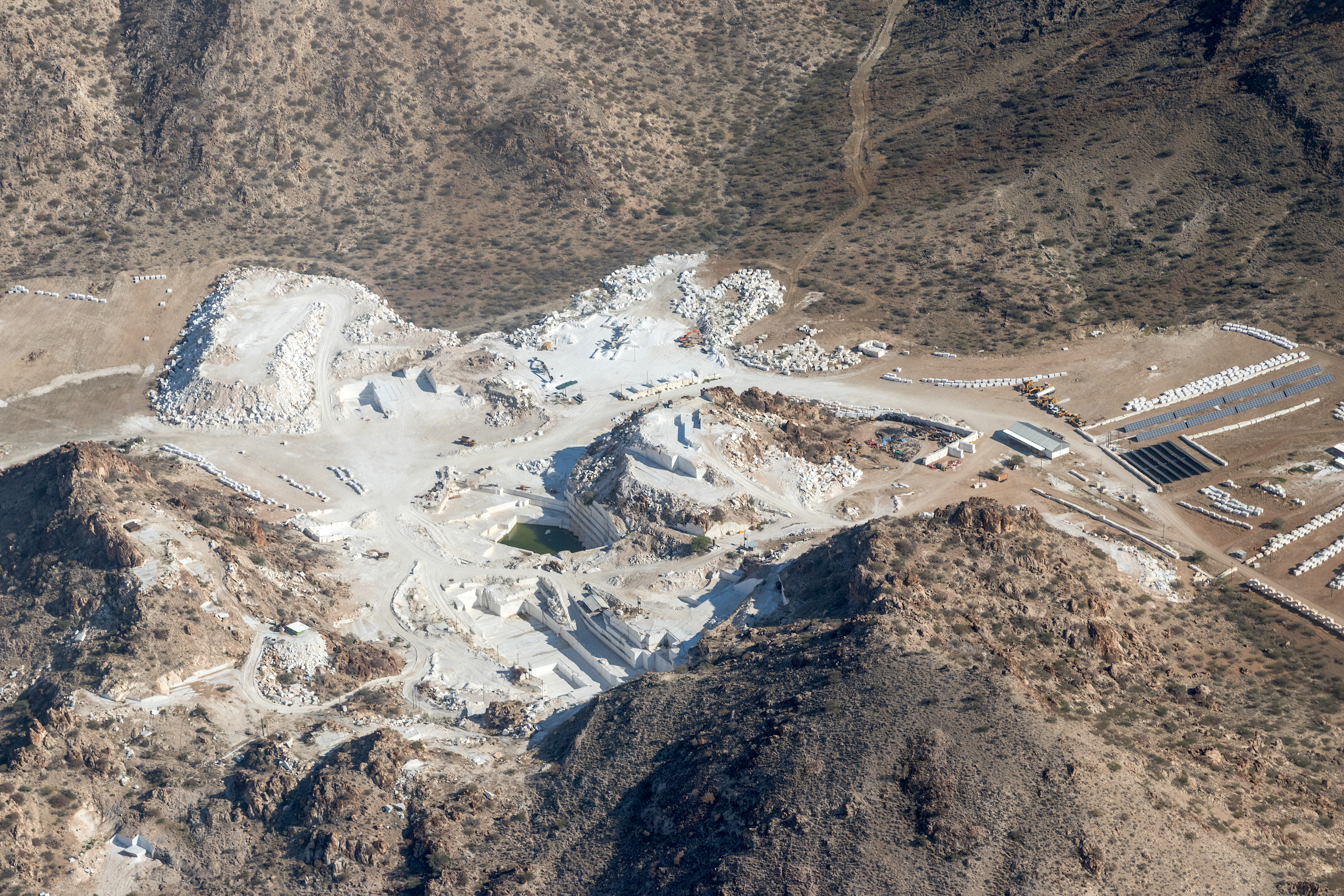
Mining of Karibib Marble (2018) 22°06′16″S 015°48′48″E

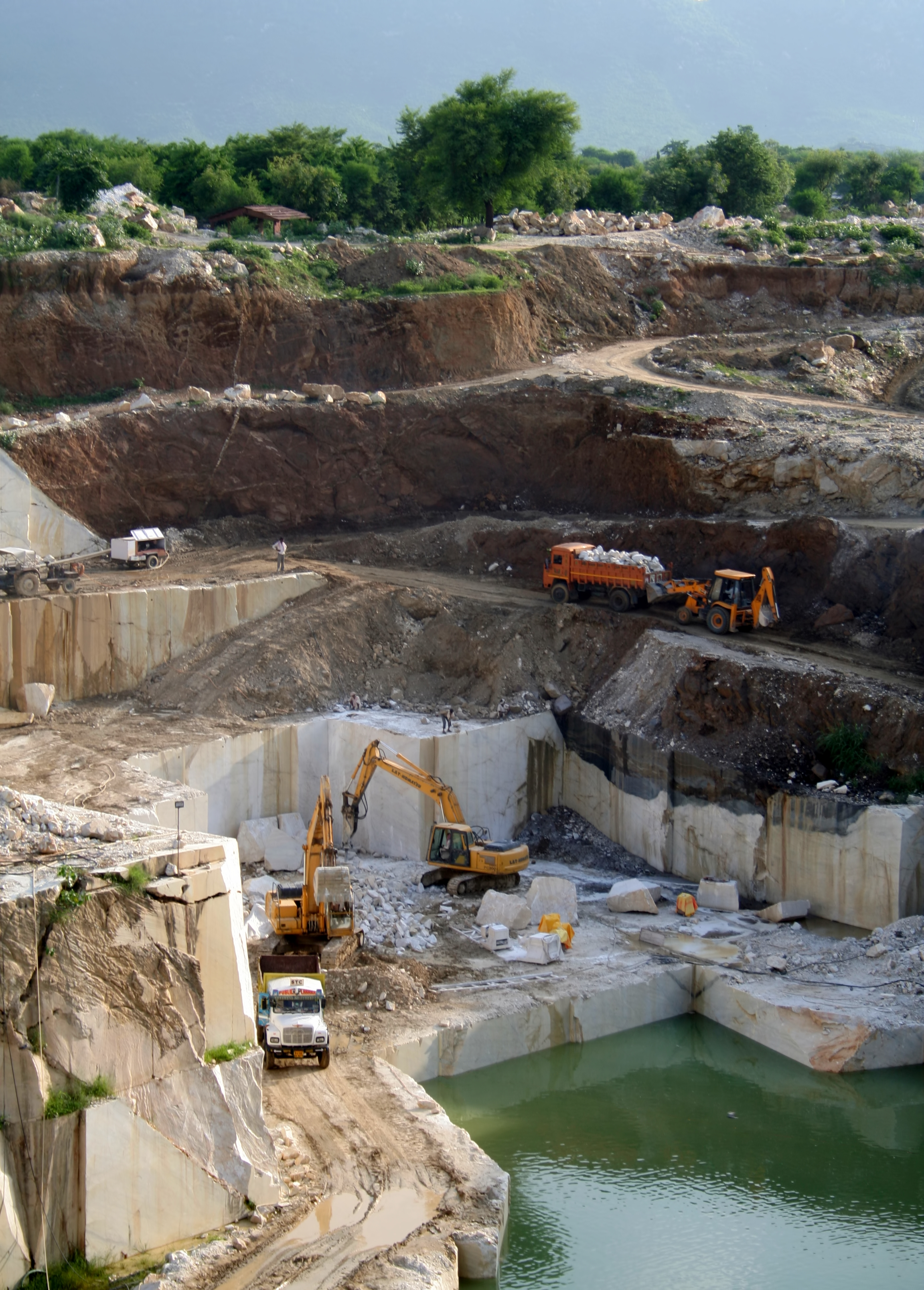
Marble quarry in Jaipur, India

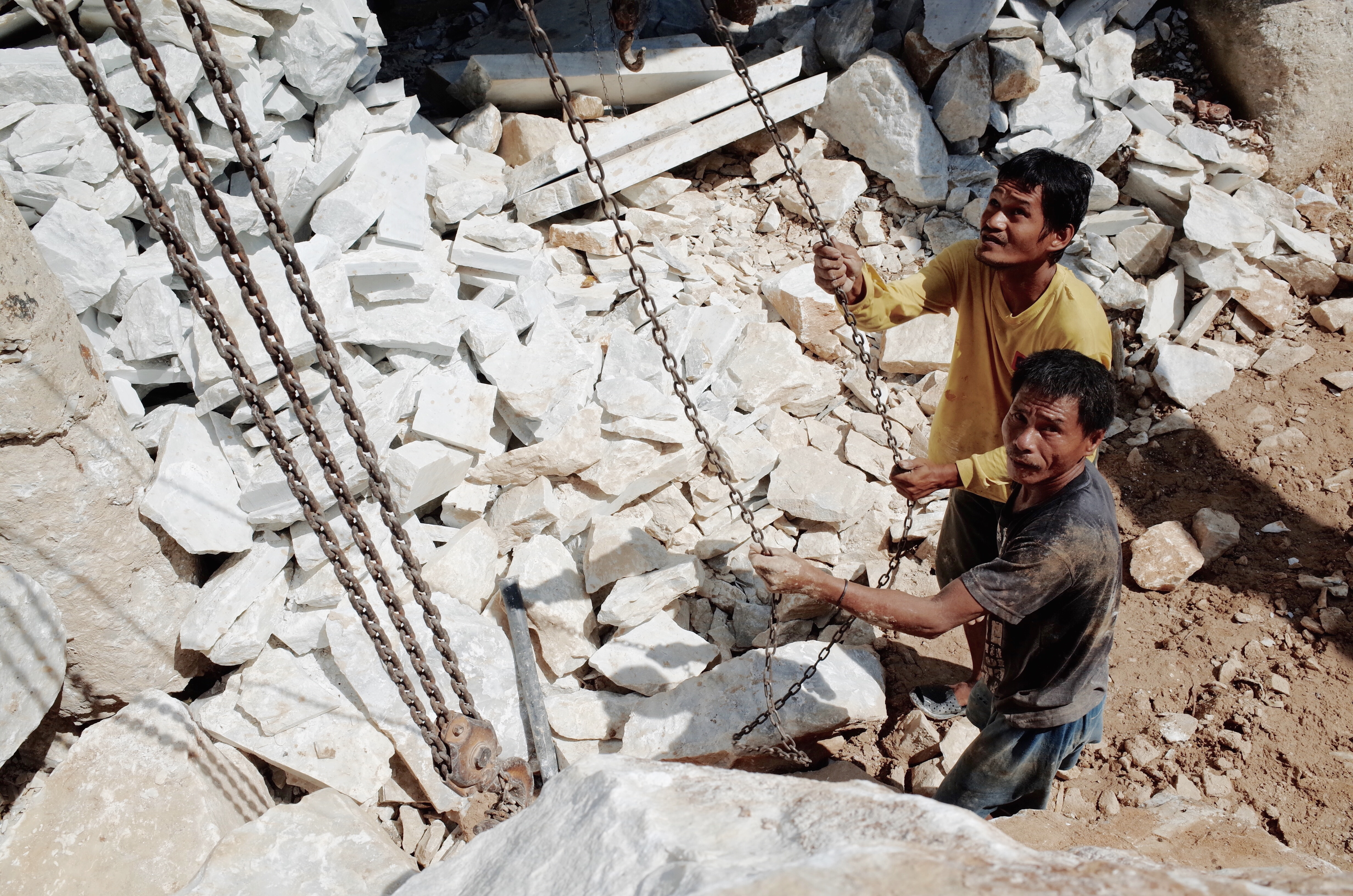
Marble plant workers in Romblon, Philippines

The extraction of marble is performed by quarrying. Blocks are favoured for most purposes, and can be created through various techniques, including drilling and blasting, water jet and wedge methods. Limestones are often commercially and historically referred to as marble, which differs from the geological definition.

=== Locations ===
Marble production was dominated by 4 countries that accounted for almost half of world production of marble and decorative stone. China and Italy were the world leaders, each representing 34% and 19% of world production respectively, followed by India and Spain produced 16% and 13% respectively.

In 2018 Turkey was the world leader in marble export, with 42% share in global marble trade, followed by Italy with 18% and Greece with 10%. The largest importer of marble in 2018 was China with a 64% market share, followed by India with 11% and Italy with 5%.

==== Ancient times ====
White marbles throughout the Mediterranean basin were widely utilized during the Roman period. Extraction centers were unevenly distributed across the Italian Peninsula, mainland Greece, the Aegean Islands, Asia Minor, and smaller hubs like those in the Iberian Peninsula. The need for extensive trade arose due to this imbalance, leading to the widespread exchange of marble objects, including building elements, sculptures, and sarcophagi. There was a significant increase in the distribution of white marble from the late 1st century BC to the end of the 2nd century AD. A gradual decline in distribution started in the third century AD.

==== United States ====
According to the United States Geological Survey, U.S. domestic marble production in 2006 was 46,400 tons valued at about $18.1 million, compared to 72,300 tons valued at $18.9 million in 2005. Crushed marble production (for aggregate and industrial uses) in 2006 was 11.8 million tons valued at $116 million, of which 6.5 million tons was finely ground calcium carbonate and the rest was construction aggregate. For comparison, 2005 crushed marble production was 7.76 million tons valued at $58.7 million, of which 4.8 million tons was finely ground calcium carbonate and the rest was construction aggregate. U.S. dimension marble demand is about 1.3 million tons. The DSAN World Demand for (finished) Marble Index has shown a growth of 12% annually for the 2000–2006 period, compared to 10.5% annually for the 2000–2005 period. The largest dimension marble application is tile.

=== Occupational safety ===
Particulate air pollution exposure has been found to be elevated in the marble production industry. Exposure to the dust produced by cutting marble could impair lung function or cause lung disease in workers, such as silicosis. Skin and eye problems are also a potential hazard. Mitigations such as dust filters, or dust suppression are suggested, but more research needs to be carried out on the efficacy of safety measures.

In the United States, the Occupational Safety and Health Administration (OSHA) has set the legal limit (permissible exposure limit) for marble exposure in the workplace as 15 mg/m^{3} total exposure and 5 mg/m^{3} respiratory exposure over an 8-hour workday. The National Institute for Occupational Safety and Health (NIOSH) has set a recommended exposure limit (REL) of 10 mg/m^{3} total exposure and 5 mg/m^{3} respiratory exposure over an 8-hour workday.

Dust, debris and temperature fluctuations from working marble can endanger the eye health of employees. For the staff involved in marble processing, it is necessary to provide eye protection equipment, and it is recommended to improve the education of all workers on occupational health risks and strengthen preventive measures.

== Cultural associations ==
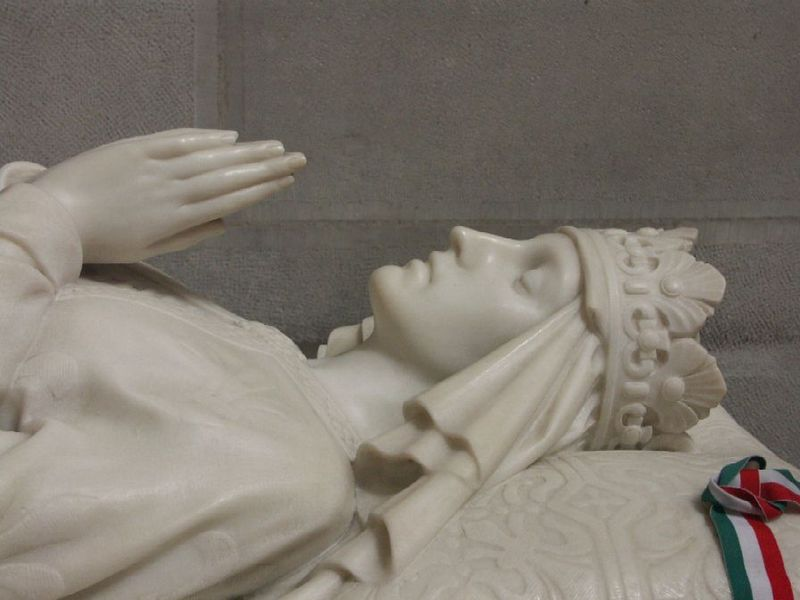
Jadwiga of Poland's sarcophagus by Antoni Madeyski, Wawel Cathedral, Kraków

As a favorite medium for Greek and Roman sculptors and architects (see classical sculpture), marble has become a cultural symbol of tradition and refined taste. Its varied and colorful patterns make it a decorative material.

Places named after the stone include Marblehead, Massachusetts; Marblehead, Ohio; Marble Arch, London; the Sea of Marmara; India's Marble Rocks; and the towns of Marble, Minnesota; Marble, Colorado; Marble Falls, Texas, and Marble Hill, Manhattan, New York.

A particularly famous set of large-scale marble sculptures comprises the Elgin Marbles from the Parthenon in Athens, now on display in the British Museum.

== Impact on the environment ==
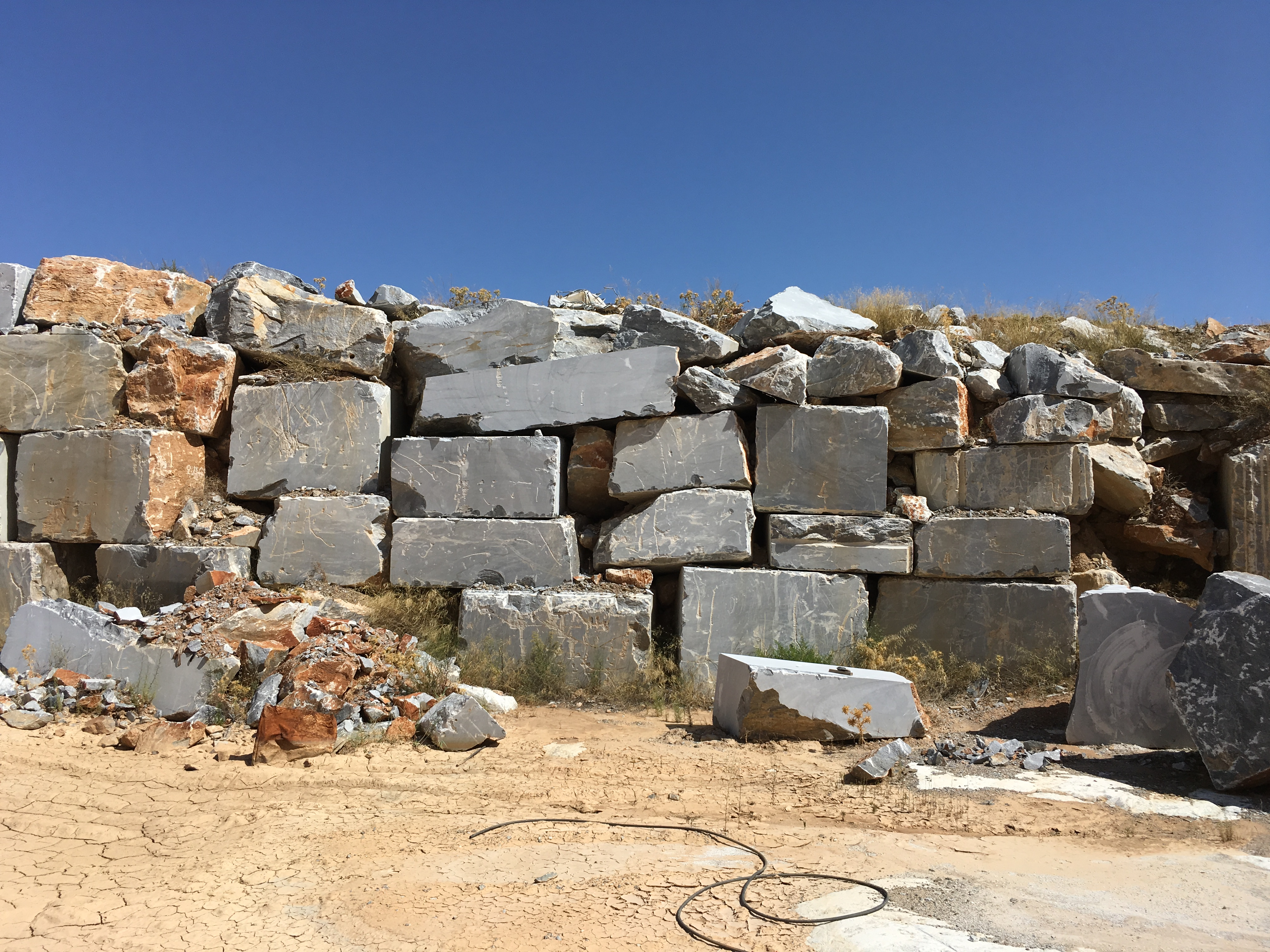
Marble waste in Aliveri.

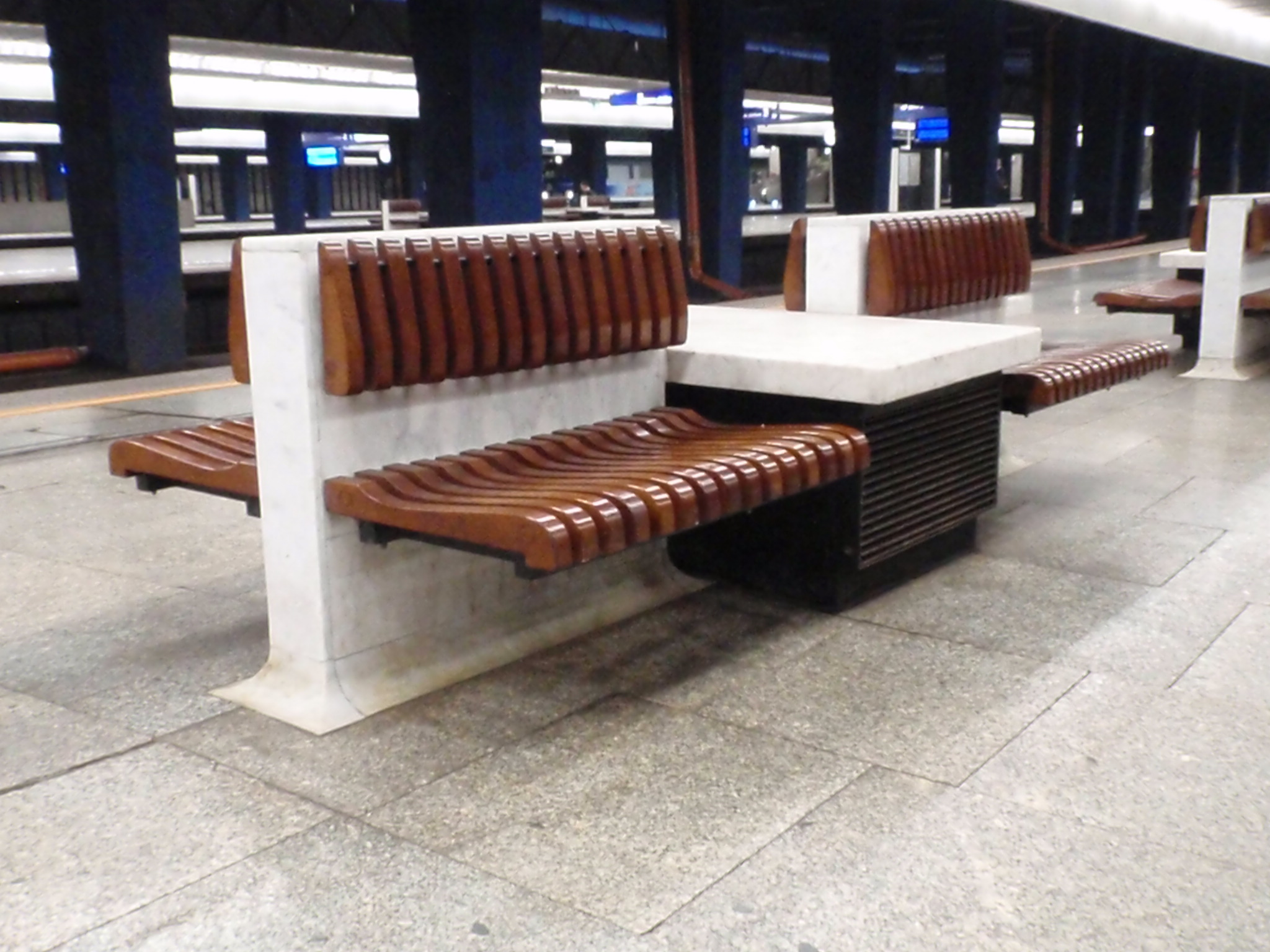
Marble bench in Warszawa Centralna railway station in Poland (1975).

Total world quarrying production in 2019 was approximately 316 million tonnes; however, quarrying waste accounted for 53% of this total production. In the process of marble mining and processing, around half of the excavated material will be waste, this is often then used as chips for flooring or wall finish, and uses for which high-calcium limestone is suitable.

== Sustainability ==
Marble sludge waste can be used as a mineral filler in water-based paints. Using ground calcium carbonate as a filler in paint production can improve the brightness, hiding power and application performance of paint, and can also replace expensive pigments such as titanium dioxide. Recycling of marble waste leads to a large amount of waste not being land-filled, reducing environmental pollution, thereby realizing the sustainability of marble. Converting waste to generate economic income and restore degraded soil can improve the environment.

== Cleaning and preservation ==
Marble is soft and porous, so it is easily scratched, and stained by colored liquids.

=== Preservation ===
- Marble surfaces are corroded by alcohol or acidic liquids.

=== Cleaning ===
- As a floor material, marble is easy to scratch. It can first be cleaned with a vacuum cleaner to suck away any grit and dust on the marble floor, and further cleaned with a steam cleaner.
- A mild, pH-neutral, non-abrasive soap is used for cleaning marble surfaces.

== Gallery ==
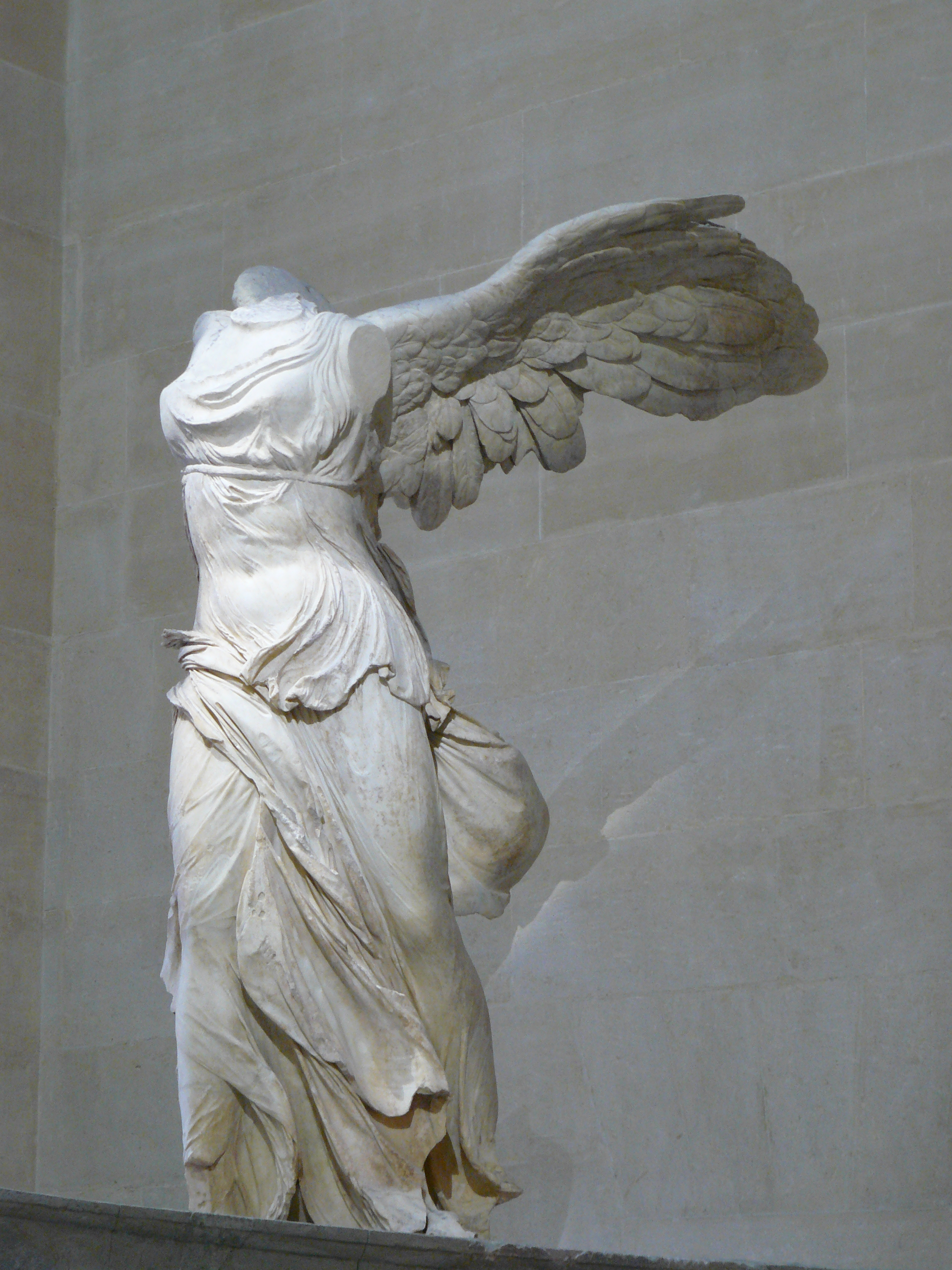
The Nike of Samothrace is made of Parian marble (c. 220–190 BC)

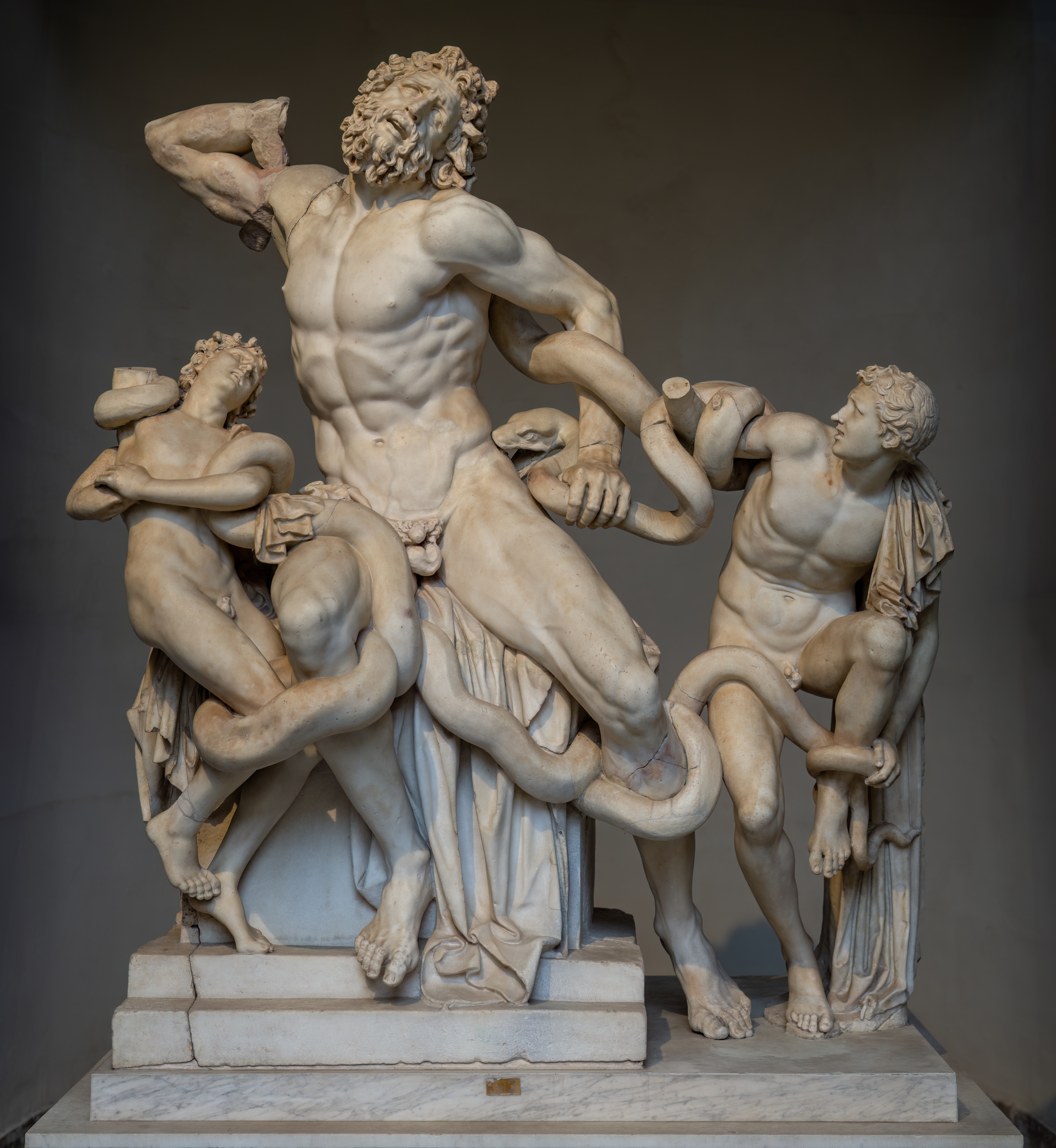
Laocoön and His Sons in the Vatican

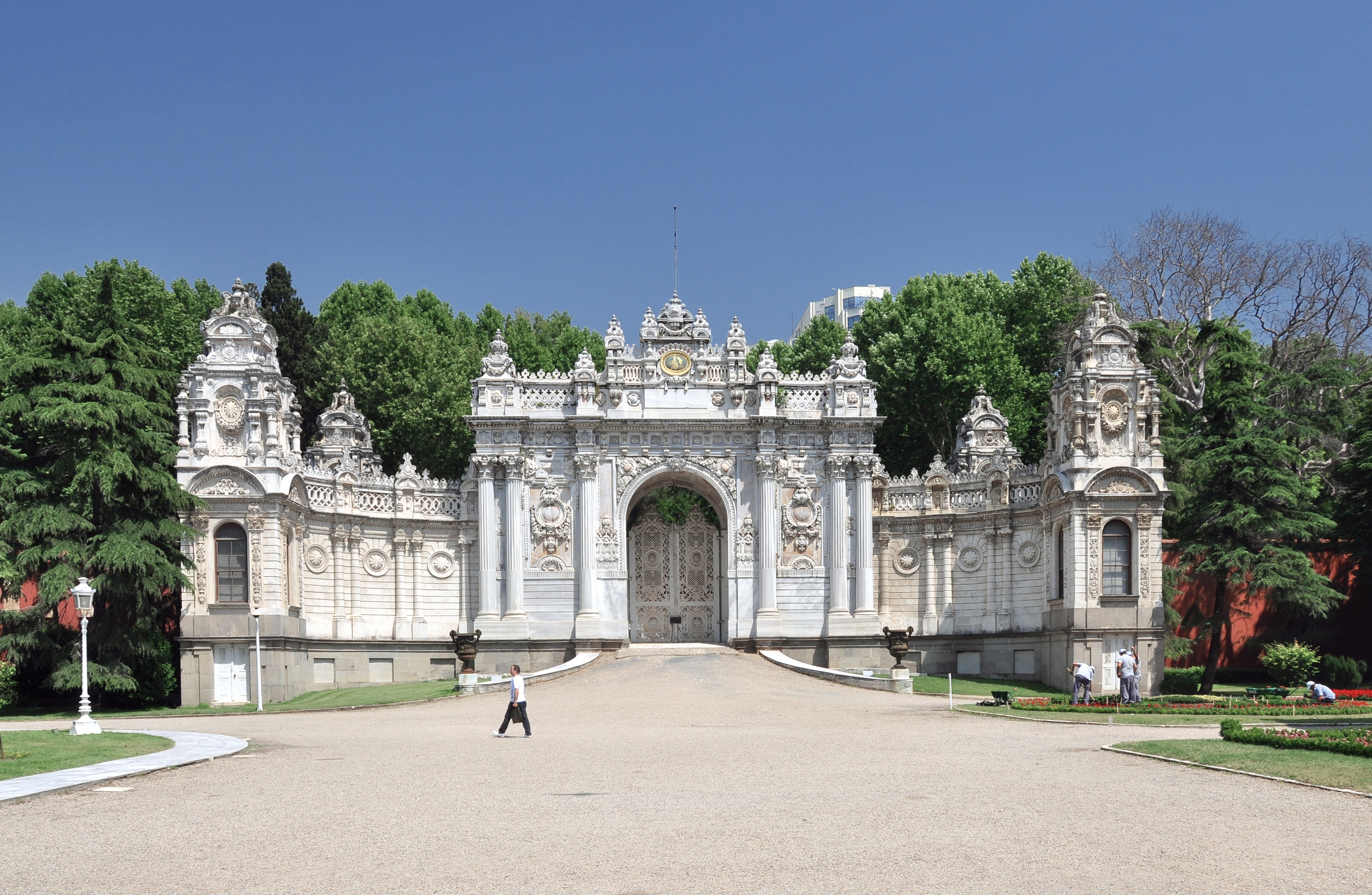
Dolmabahçe Palace in Istanbul

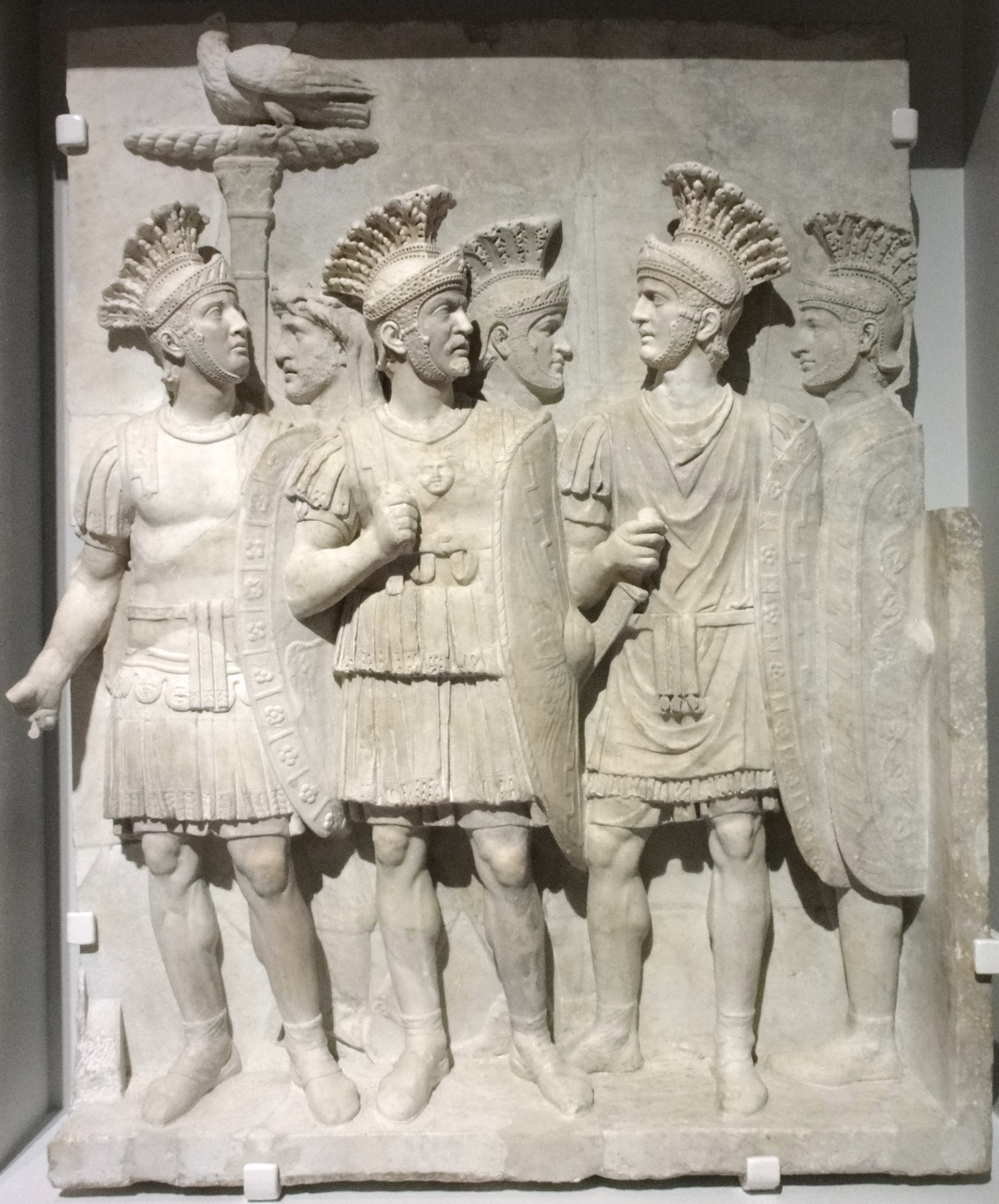
The Praetorians Relief, made from grey veined marble, c. 51–52 AD

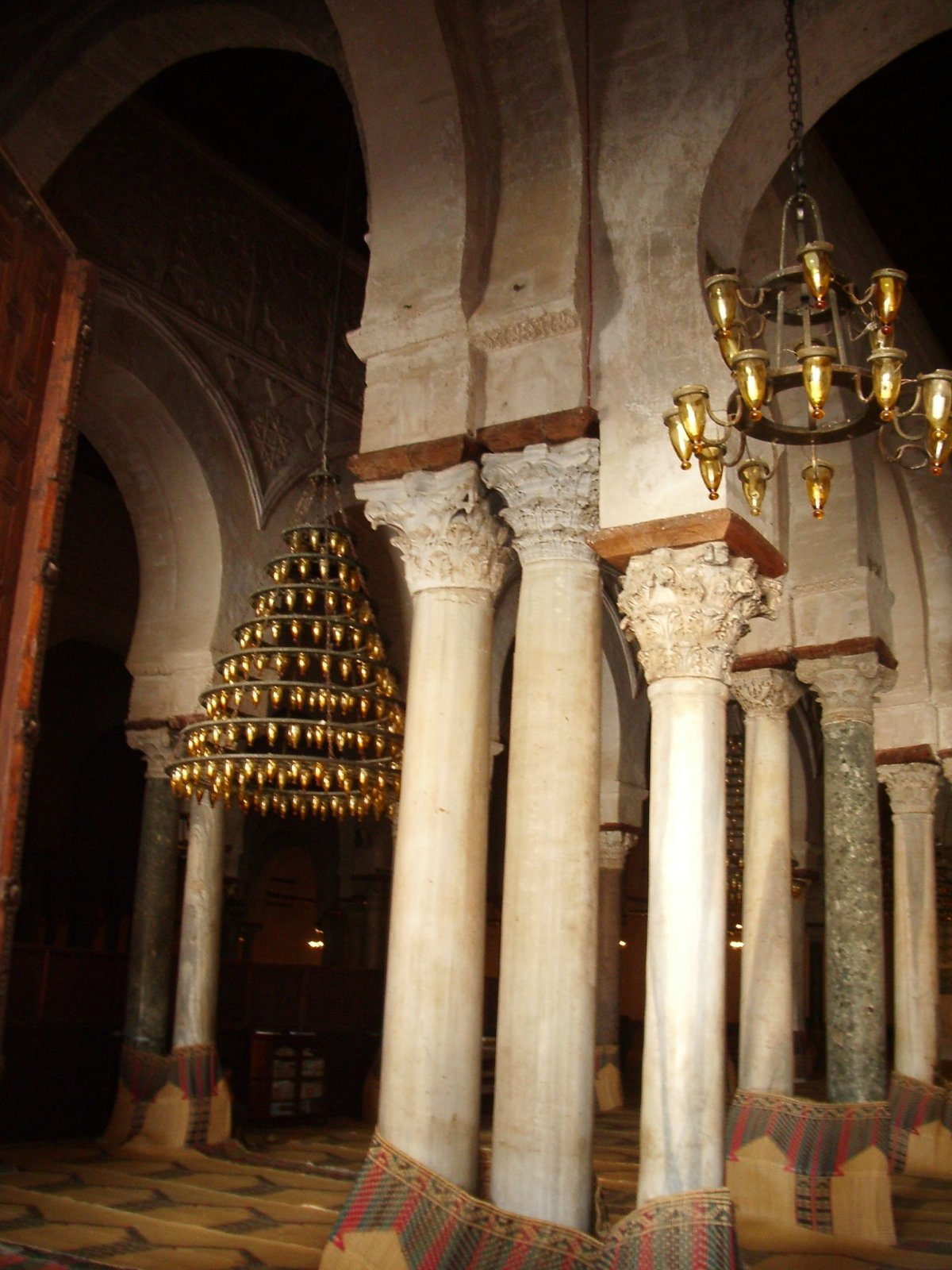
Ancient marble columns in the prayer hall of the Mosque of Uqba, in Kairouan, Tunisia

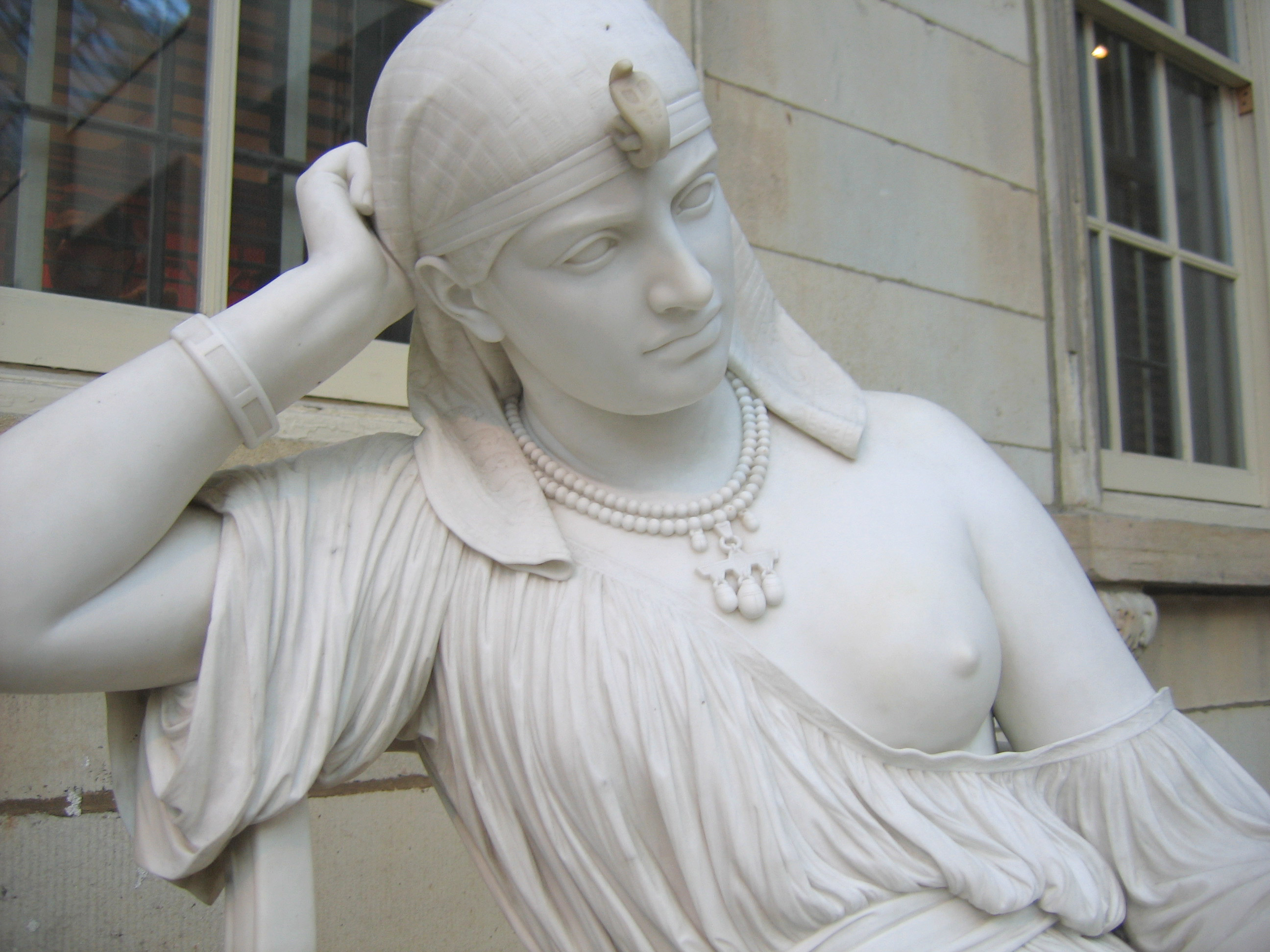
Cleopatra by William Wetmore Story was described and admired in Nathaniel Hawthorne's romance The Marble Faun, and is on display at The Metropolitan Museum of Art in New York City.

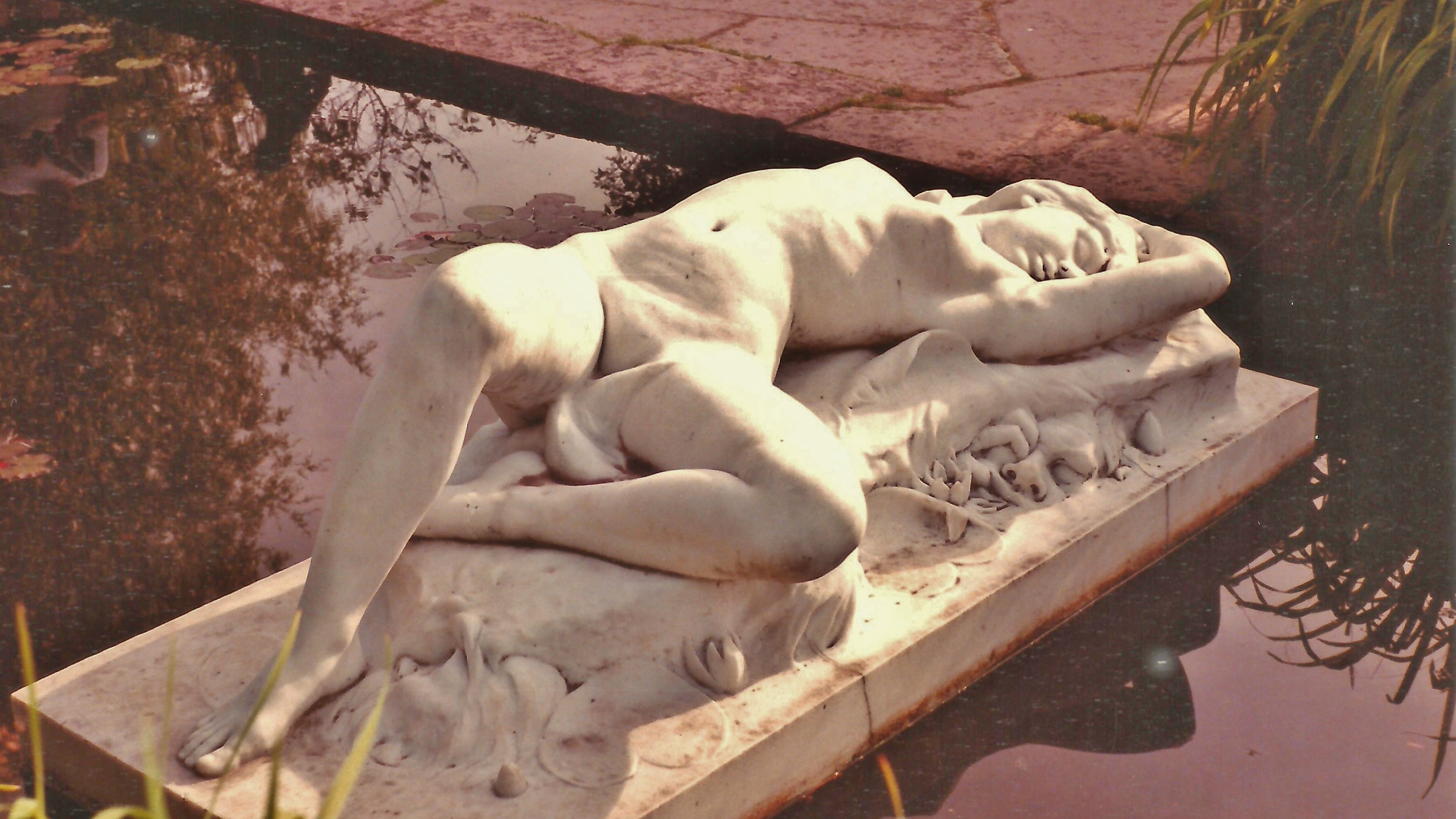
Näckrosen (Water Lily), Stockholm 1892, by Swedish sculptor Per Hasselberg (1850–1894). Here a copy from 1953 in marble by Giovanni Ardini (Italy) placed in Rottneros Park near Sunne in Värmland/Sweden.

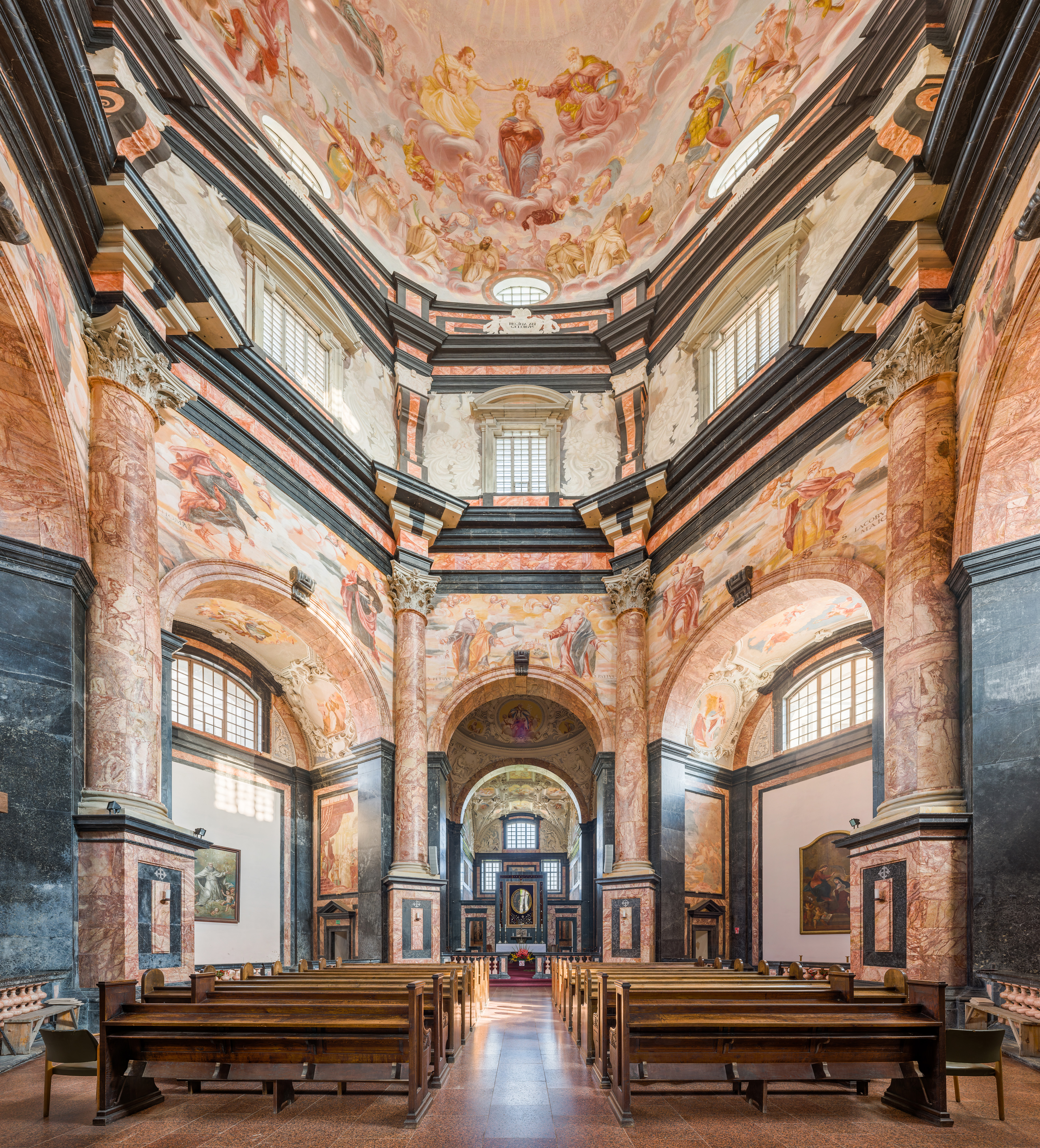
Pažaislis Monastery complex has the most marble-decorated Baroque church of the Grand Duchy of Lithuania

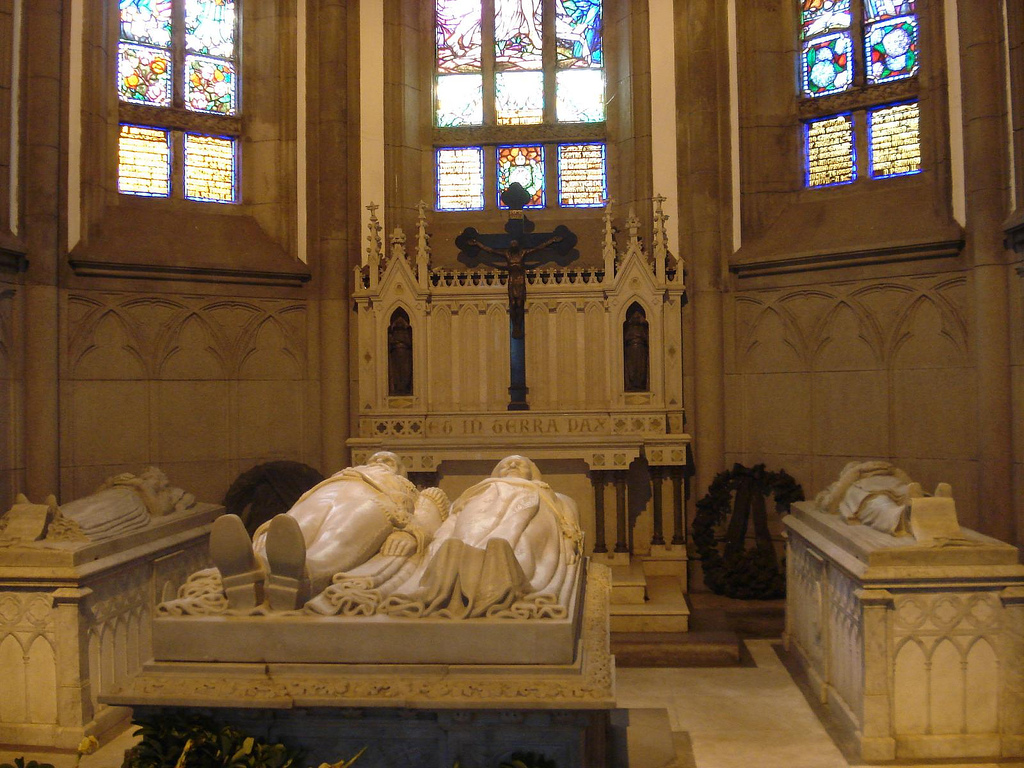
The Carrara marble tombs of Emperor Pedro II of Brazil and other members of the Brazilian imperial family in the Cathedral of Saint Peter of Alcantara in Petrópolis

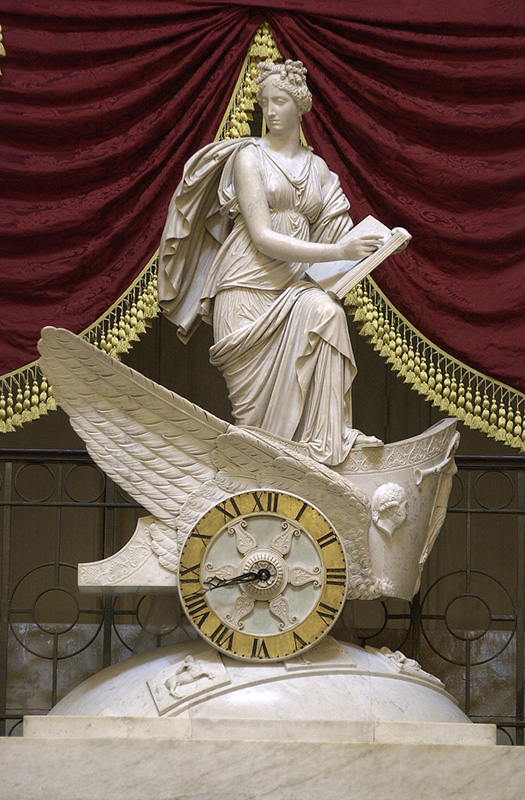
Carlo Franzoni's life-size sculptural marble chariot clock, the Car of History, depicting Clio, the Greek muse of history (National Statuary Hall, U.S. Capitol Building).

== See also ==
- Grand Antique marble
- Marble sculpture
- Marmorino
- Naxian marble
- Carrara marble
- Paper marbling
- Pietra dura, inlaying with marble and other stones
- Ruin marble, marble that contains light and dark patterns, giving the impression of a ruined cityscape
- Scagliola, imitating marble with plasterwork
- Verd antique, sometimes (erroneously) called "serpentine marble", and often confused with Connemara marble
