= Grand Antique marble =

Type of marble quarried in France

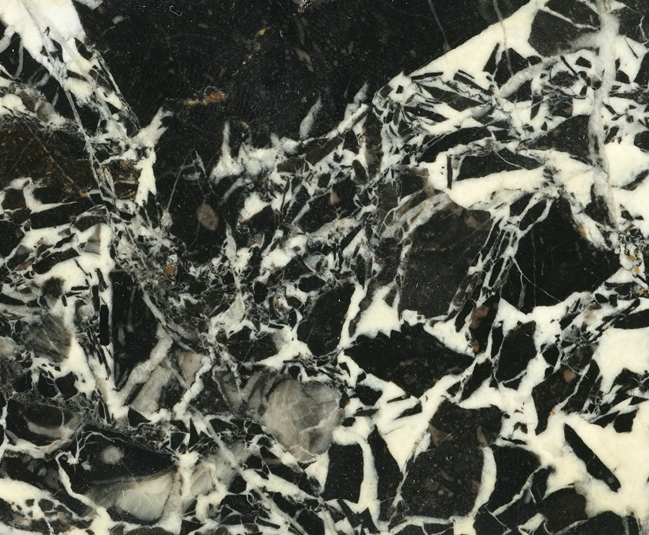
- also Celtic marble (Latin: marmor celticum); Grand Antique of Aubert

- Location within France
- Location: near Aubert-Moulis, France
- Coordinates: 42°57′43″N 1°05′30″E

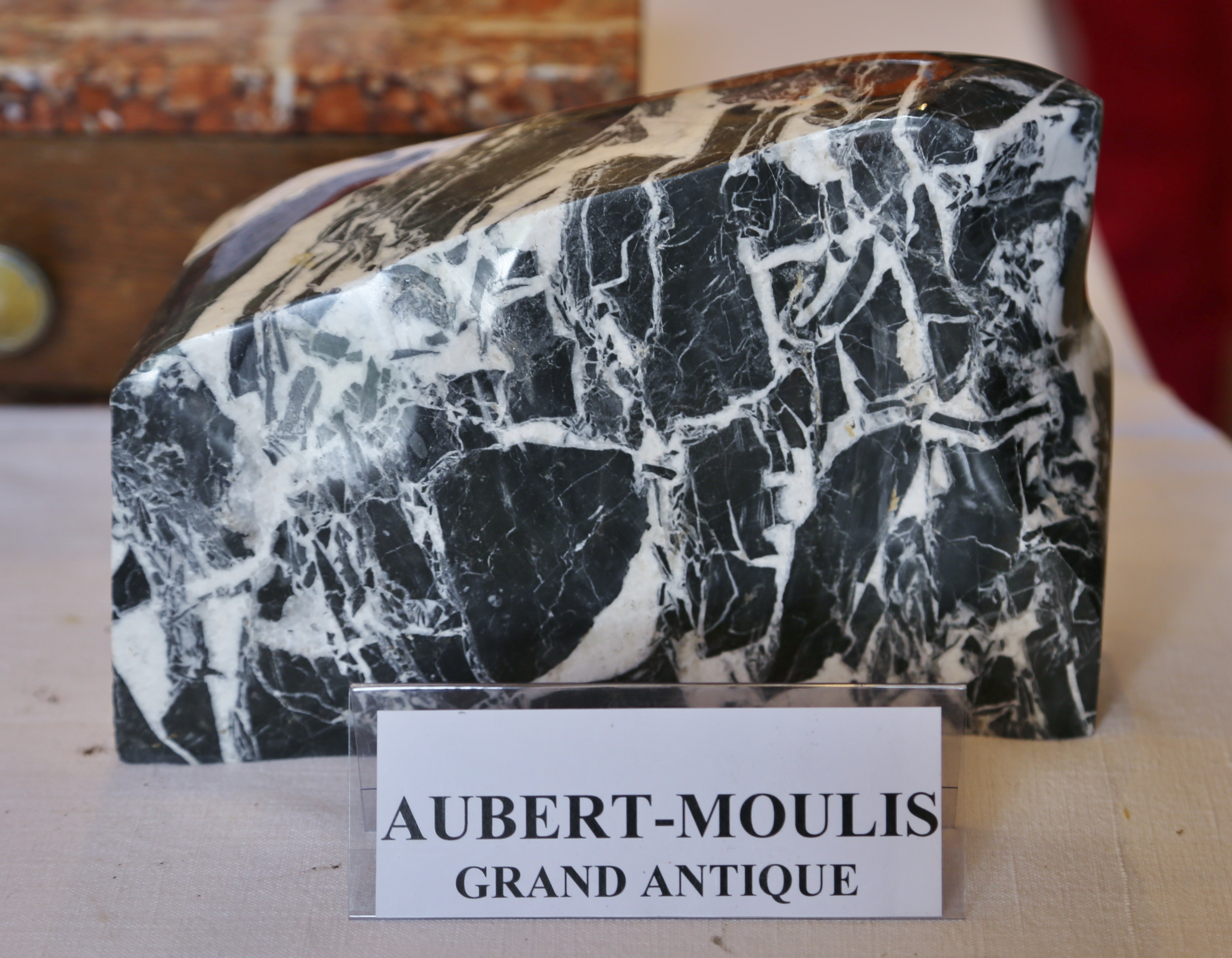

Grand Antique marble (also Celtic marble (Latin: marmor celticum), Grand Antique of Aubert, and known in Roman times as Marmor Aquitanicum), is a prestigious marble, composed of clasts of black limestone and white calcite, quarried near Aubert-Moulis in France. The fault breccia from which it is extracted was formed at the end of the Cretaceous period, following the corrugation that affected the Northern Pyrenean area about 65 million years ago.

The marble was first quarried by the Romans in the third or fourth century and was exported in large quantities to Rome and Constantinople, primarily for decorative columns. Roman examples include the ciborium in Santa Cecilia and the candelabra of the Paschal candle in Santa Maria Maggiore. In Byzantium, the marble was used for decorative panels in Hagia Sophia.

The quarry was subsequently closed, and the blocks already extracted were utilized for several churches, including St Peter's Basilica in Rome, St Mark's Basilica in Venice, and Westminster in London. The marble was widely used by Émile-Jacques Ruhlmann for fireplaces. Examples are also found in the Les Invalides, for the columns on the altar in the chapel and the tomb of Joseph Napoleon, and at Versailles. More recently, this marble had also been extensively used in New York during the 1920s on the exterior facade of the Roosevelt Hotel, as well as on the recent extension of the Museum of Modern Art for interior decoration.

Exploited intermittently and then closed in 1948, the quarry was reopened in 2012 when the Italian company Escavamar purchased the operating rights with the goal of providing high-quality marble in measured quantities to a luxury and high-end clientele. In 2015, Escavamar officially registered the trademark "Grand Antique d'Aubert".

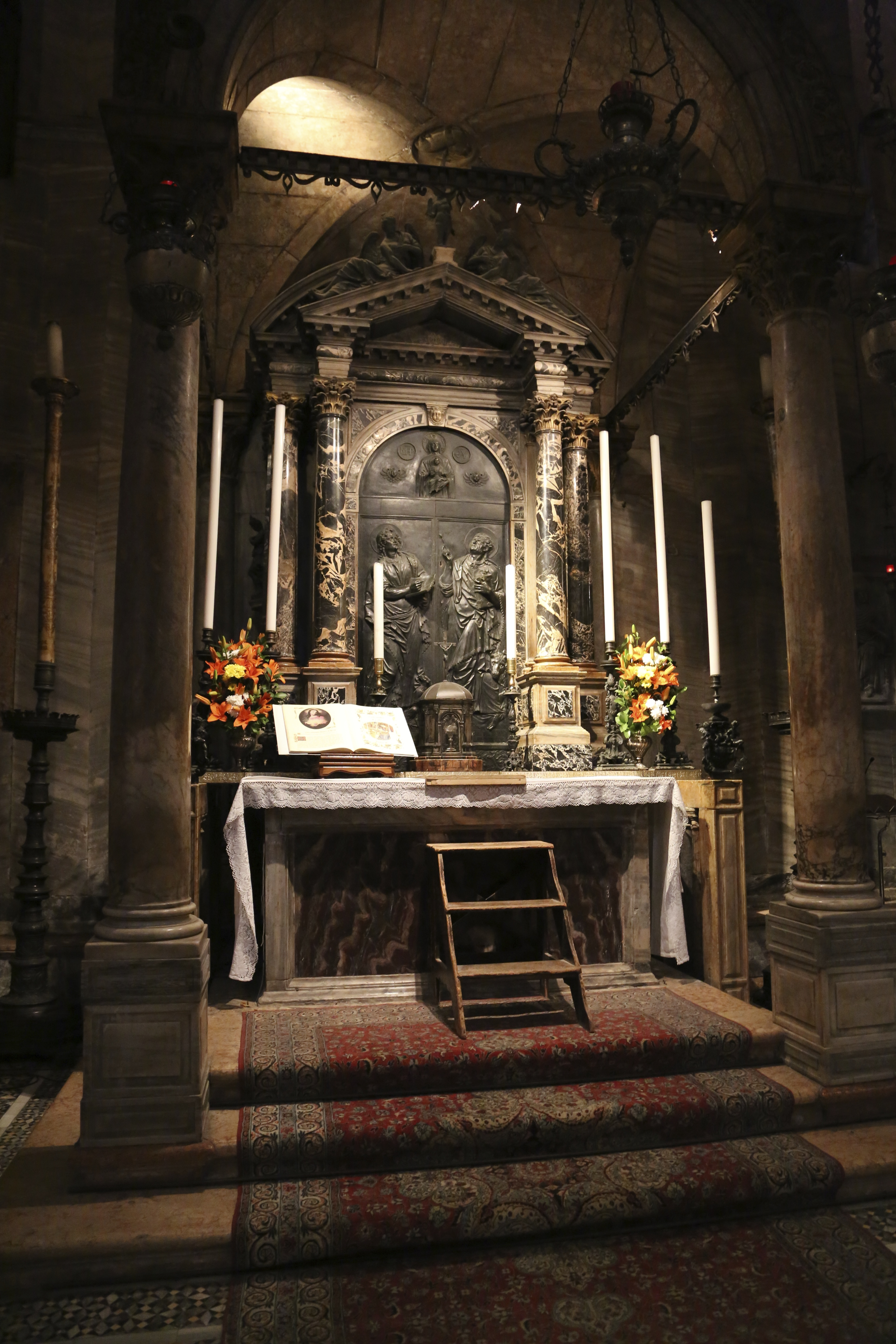
Altar of the Madonna Nicopeia
(St Mark's Basilica)

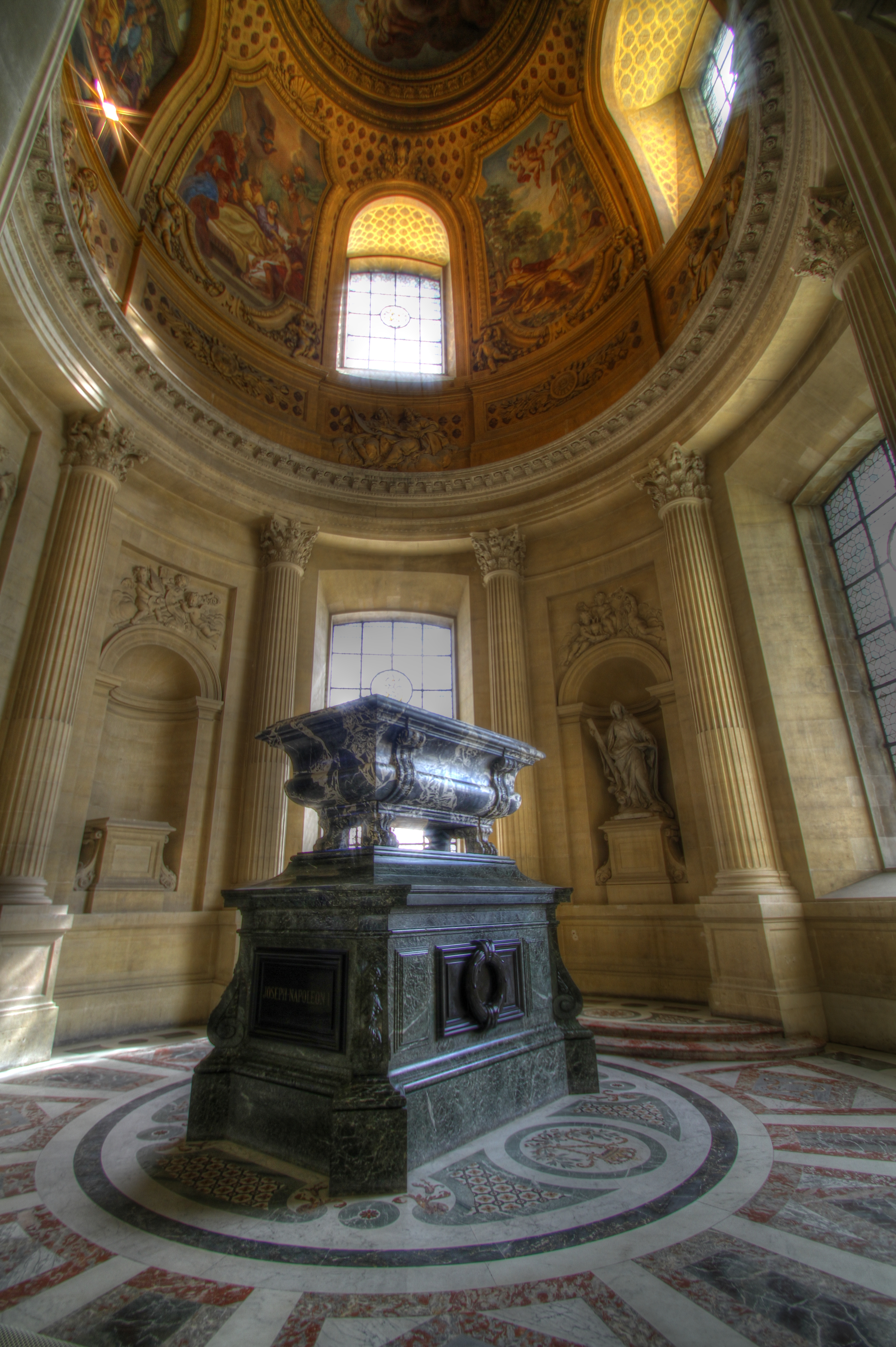
Tomb of Joseph Napoleon
(Les Invalides)

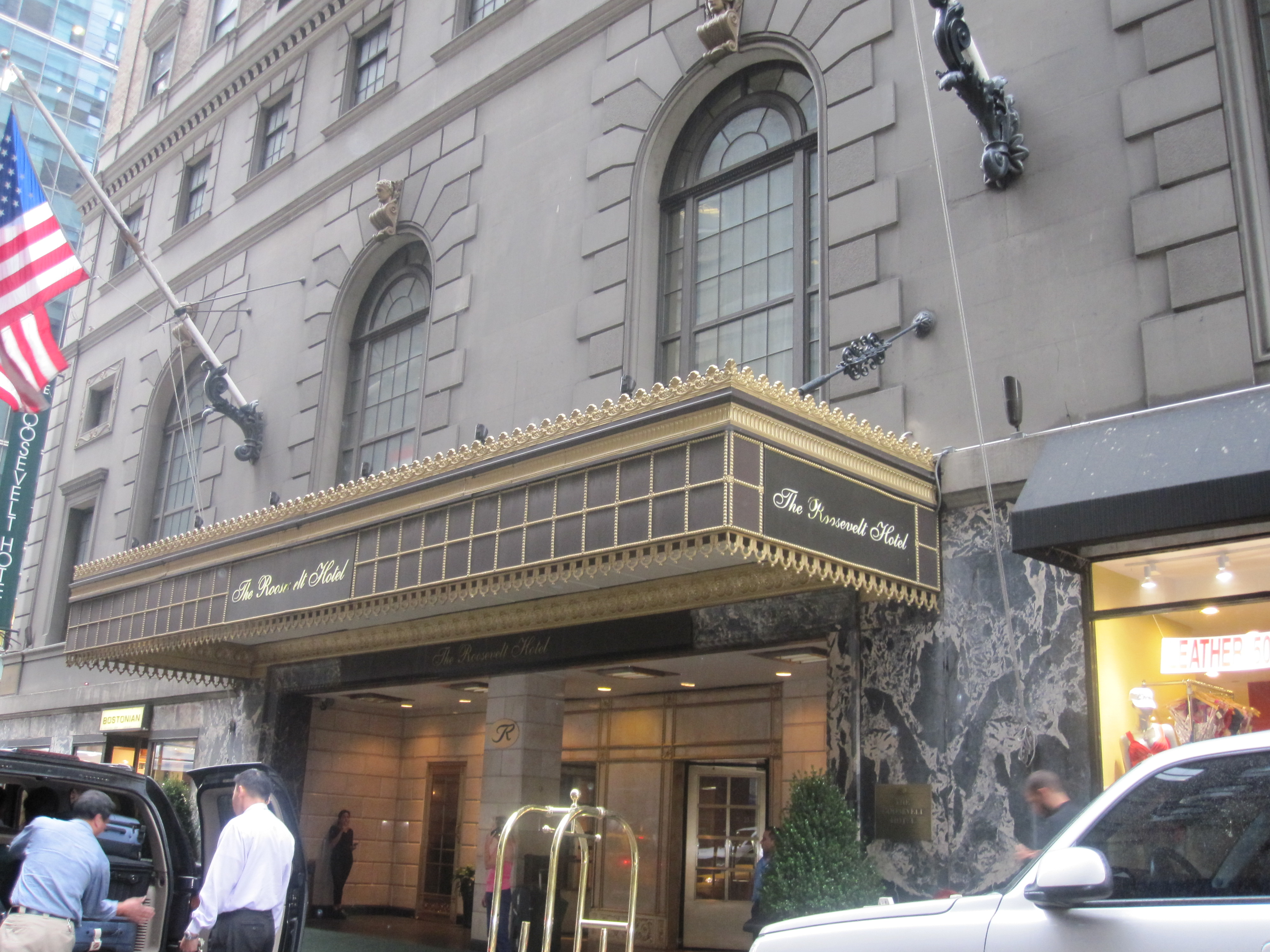
Roosevelt Hotel in New York City
