= Moulis, Ariège =

Commune in Occitanie, France

Moulis
- Commune
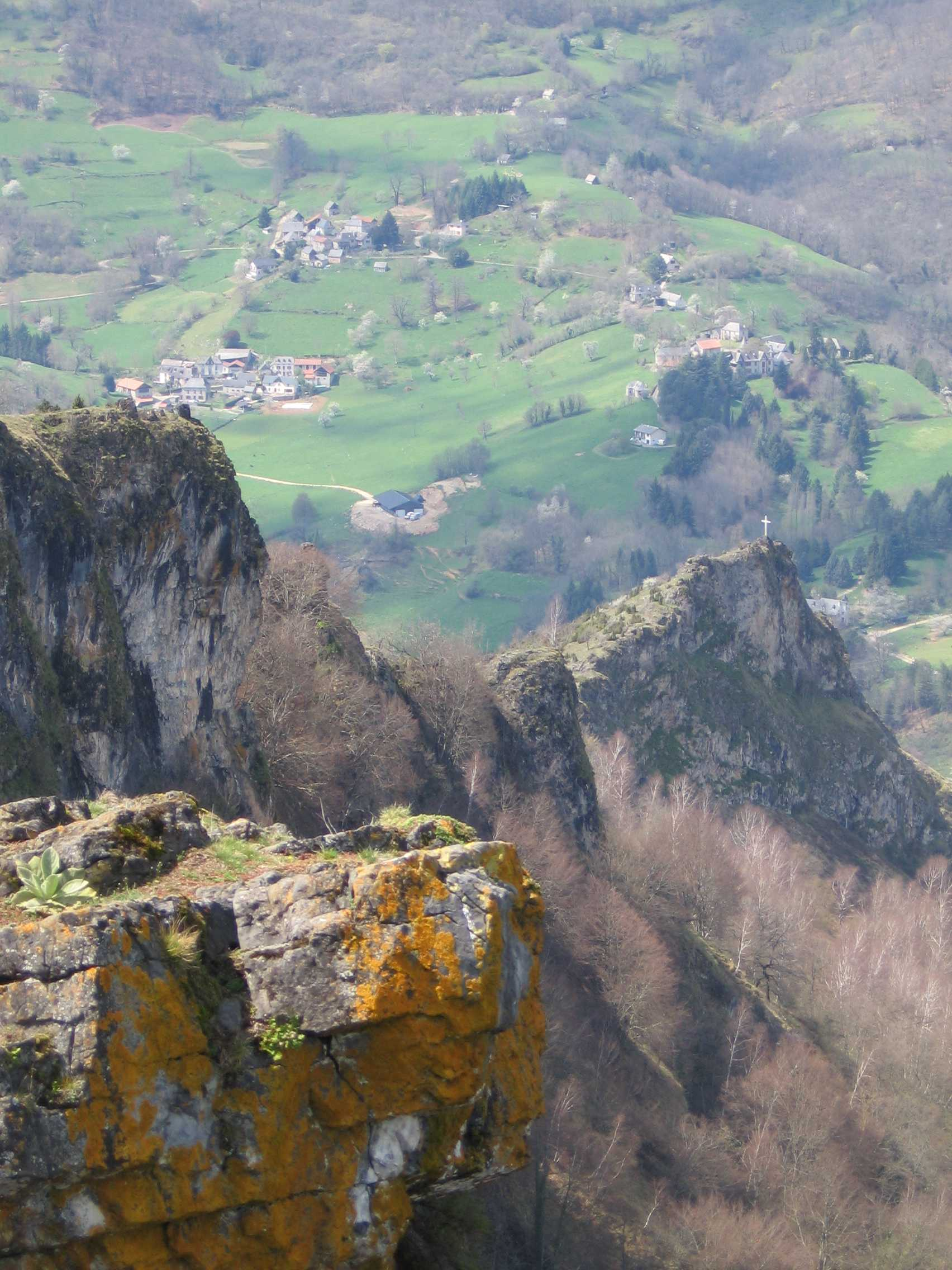
- Looking across the Lez valley from the Cap de la Pène
- Location of Moulis
- Location within France Location within Occitanie
- Coordinates: 42°57′43″N 1°05′30″E
- Country: France
- Region: Occitania
- Department: Ariège
- Arrondissement: Saint-Girons
- Canton: Couserans Ouest

Government
  - Mayor (2020–2026): Damien Souque
- Area^{1}: 36.55 km^{2} (14.11 sq mi)
- Elevation: 432 m (1,417 ft)
- Highest elevation: 1,608 m (5,276 ft)
- Lowest elevation: 412 m (1,352 ft)
- Population (2023): 794
  - Density: 21.7/km^{2} (56.3/sq mi)
- Time zone: UTC+01:00 (CET)
  - Summer (DST): UTC+02:00 (CEST)
- INSEE/Postal code: 09214 /09200
- ^{1} French Land Register data, which excludes lakes, ponds, glaciers > 1 km^{2} (0.386 sq mi or 247 acres) and river estuaries.

Moulis is a commune in the Ariège department in southwestern France.

== Geography ==
Moulis is situated on the D618 road, which follows the Lez river valley from Castillon-en-Couserans to Saint Girons. Either side of the Lez valley, the land surface of the commune rises steeply to forested mountains, giving a height difference of 1200 m between the lowest point of the commune and the highest.

== Population ==
The inhabitants of Moulis are known as Moulisiens in French. Much of the population is grouped in the villages of Moulis, Luzenac, Aubert and Pouech, all of which are in the Lez valley. The rest of the population is dispersed in small hamlets or isolated farms across the commune.

Historical population
Year	Pop.	±% p.a.
1968	1,013	—
1975	847	−2.52%
1982	828	−0.32%
1990	798	−0.46%
1999	759	−0.56%
2007	794	+0.57%
2012	793	−0.03%
2017	761	−0.82%
2023	794	+0.71%
Source: INSEE

== See also ==
- Communes of the Ariège department
