= Herbstein =

- Town
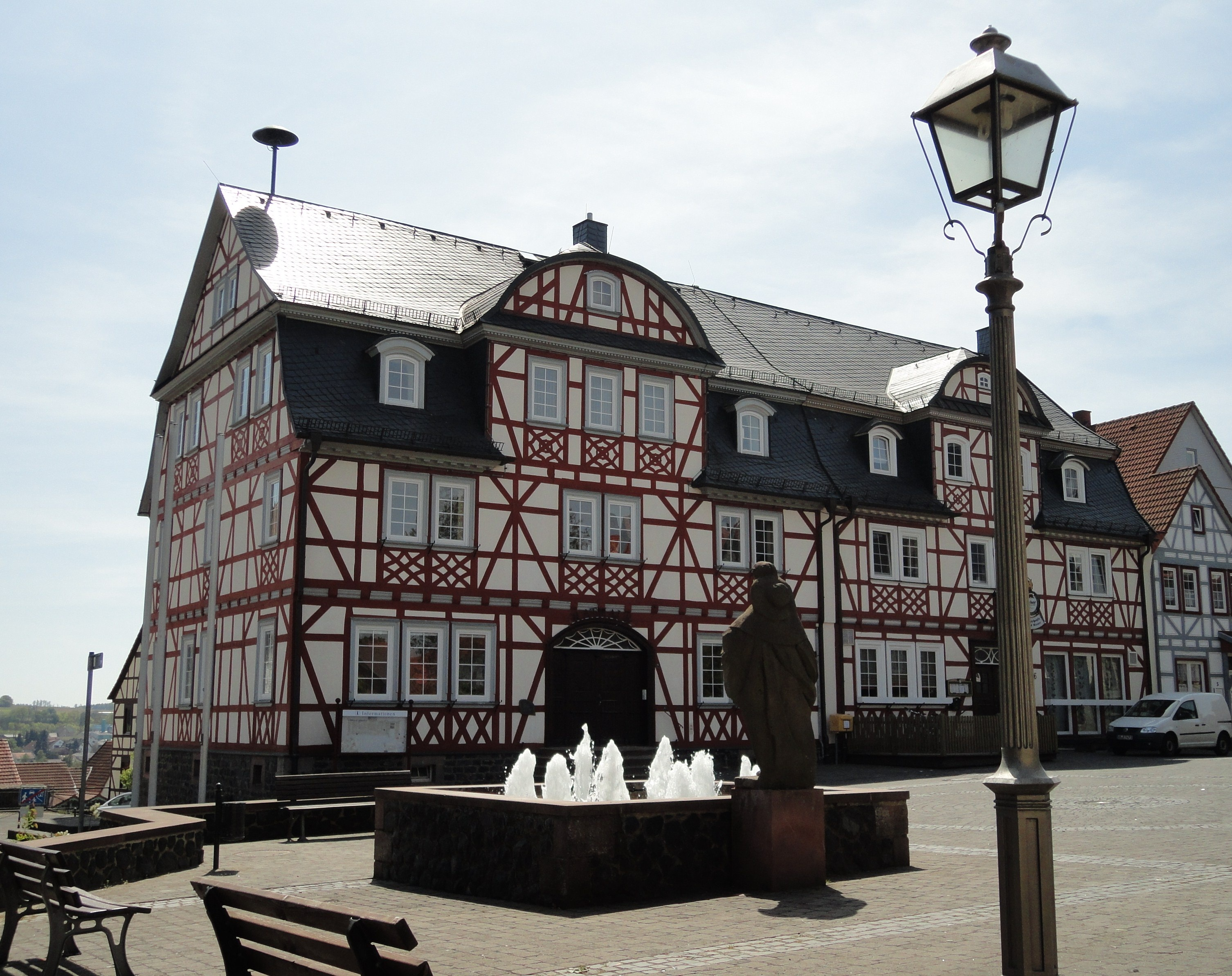
- Town hall

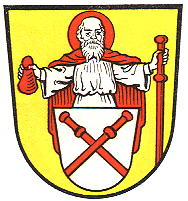
- Coat of arms

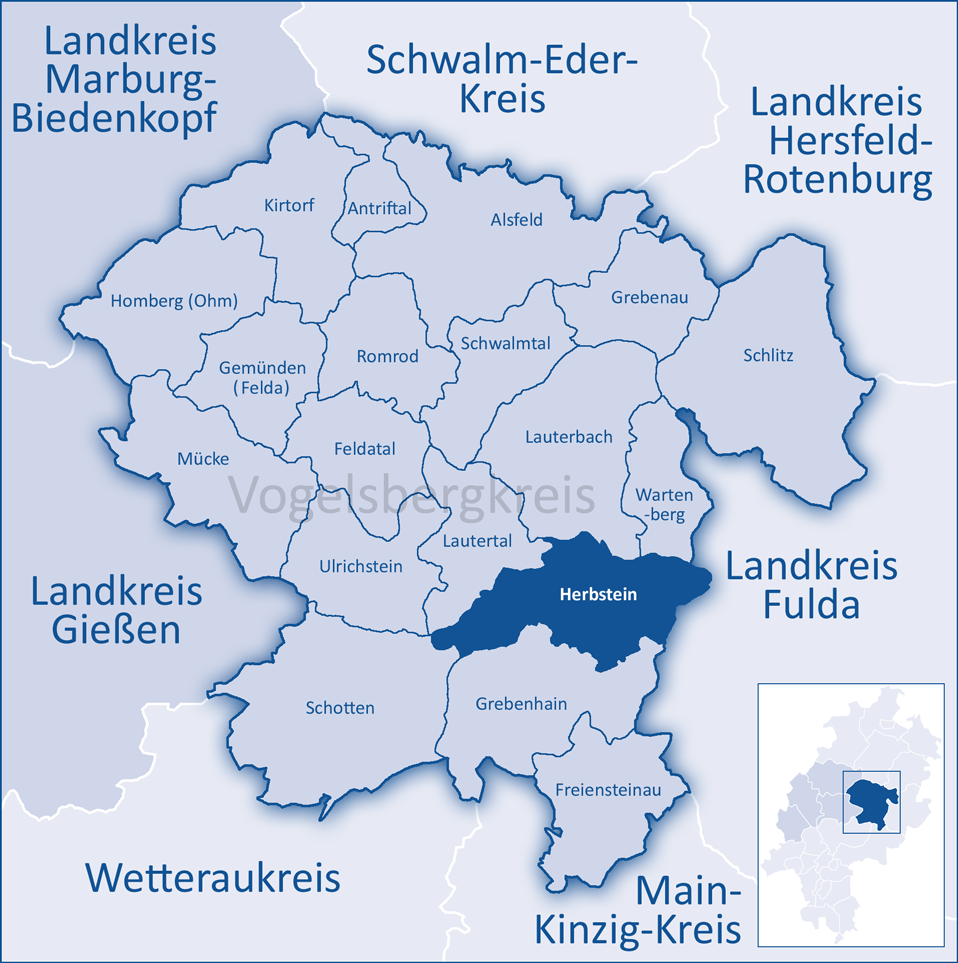
- Location of Herbstein within Vogelsbergkreis district
- Interactive map of Herbstein
- Location within Germany Location within Hesse
- Coordinates: 50°33′N 09°21′E
- Country: Germany
- State: Hesse
- Admin. region: Gießen
- District: Vogelsbergkreis

Government
  - Mayor (2023–29): Astrid Staubach (Ind.)

Area
  - Total: 79.98 km^{2} (30.88 sq mi)
- Elevation: 461 m (1,512 ft)

Population (2025-12-31)
  - Total: 4,527
  - Density: 56.60/km^{2} (146.6/sq mi)
- Time zone: UTC+01:00 (CET)
  - Summer (DST): UTC+02:00 (CEST)
- Postal codes: 36358
- Dialling codes: 06643, 06647
- Vehicle registration: VB
- Website: www.herbstein.de

Herbstein (German pronunciation: [ˈhɛʁpˌʃtaɪn]) is a small town in the Vogelsbergkreis in Hesse, Germany.

== Geography ==
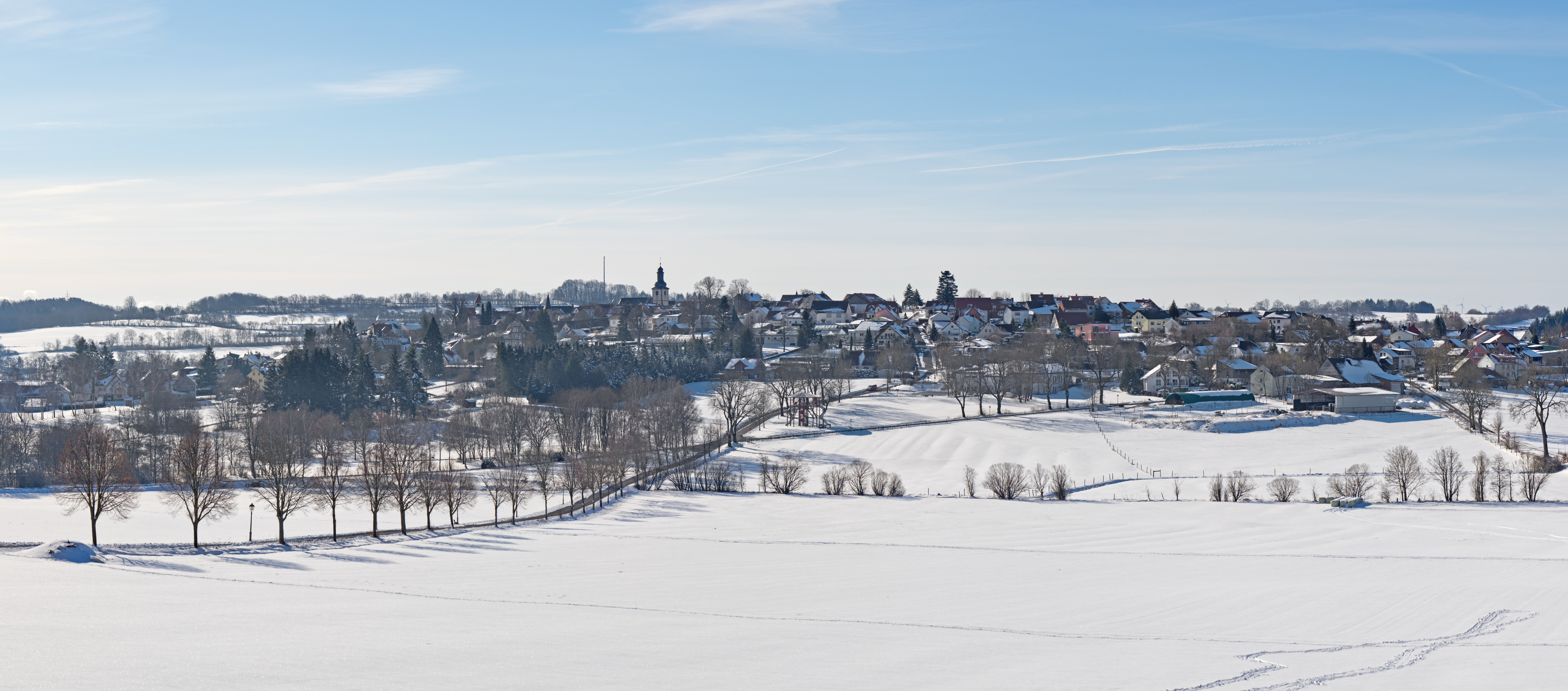
Herbstein

=== Location ===
The spa town of Herbstein lies on the eastern slope of the Vogelsberg Mountains. in Germany.

=== Neighbouring municipalities ===
Herbstein borders in the north on the municipality of Lautertal and the municipality of Wartenberg, in the east on the municipalities of Großenlüder and Hosenfeld (both in Fulda district), in the south on the municipality of Grebenhain, and in the west on the town of Schotten.

=== Constituent municipalities ===
The town consists of the main town of Herbstein and also the outlying centres of Altenschlirf, Lanzenhain, Schlechtenwegen, Steinfurt, Rixfeld, Schadges and Stockhausen.

The last name of the municipality, Stockhausen, is particularly old, having had its first documentary mention in 882 when it was identified as a fief of the Fulda Abbey. It is believed, however, to date back much further than that.

== History ==
Herbstein had its first documentary mentioned in 1011 in a donation document from the monastery at Fulda. In 1262, Herbstein was granted town rights. Until 1802 the town belonged to the Princely Abbey (Fürstabtei) of Fulda. There followed a short time of changing leadership until the town passed to the Grand Duchy of Hesse in 1810.

As part of Hesse's municipal reforms, the formerly independent municipalities of Altenschlirf, Lanzenhain, Schlechtenwegen and Steinfurt were amalgamated into the town of Herbstein with effect on 31 December 1971. Rixfeld, Schadges and Stockhausen followed on 1 August 1972.

== Politics ==
=== Town council ===
The municipal elections on 11 March 2011 yielded the following results:

- CDU 9 seats
- SPD 7 seats
- FW (citizens' coalition) 7 seats

=== Coat of arms ===
Herbstein's civic coat of arms in its present form seems to have originated in the 17th century. Before that, the arms were a simple cross from the arms of the Fulda Abbey. The figure in the arms is Saint James the Elder, and the two crossed staffs on the inescutcheon are symbols associated with him – he was beaten to death with clubs. The arms were conferred on Herbstein in 1952.

=== Partnerships ===
The town of Herbstein maintains partnerships with the following places:

- Oelegem (part of Ranst) near Antwerp, Belgium, since 1968
- Hévíz, Hungary, since 1995.

== Economy and infrastructure ==
Ever since a thermal spring was bored in 1976, the town has been increasingly gearing its activities towards running a spa. In 1980, a thermal orthopaedic bath (of a kind known in German as a Bewegungsbad – "movement bath") opened in Herbstein and in the year 1994 the Kurmittelhaus – a place offering treatments for various complaints – was dedicated. In 2000 these efforts were at last crowned when the town had the title "Heilbad" – "Healing Bath" – bestowed upon it.

== Sundry ==
Within Herbstein's bounds lay the geographical centre point of the old West Germany.

== See also ==
- Herbstein (surname)
