= Herbstein (surname) =

Herbstein is a surname. Notable people with the surname include:

- Gaby Herbstein (born 1969), Argentine visual artist and photographer
- Manu Herbstein (born 1936), South African writer and awarded author

== See also ==
- Herbstein, small town in the state of Hesse, in central western Germany
