= Hévíz =

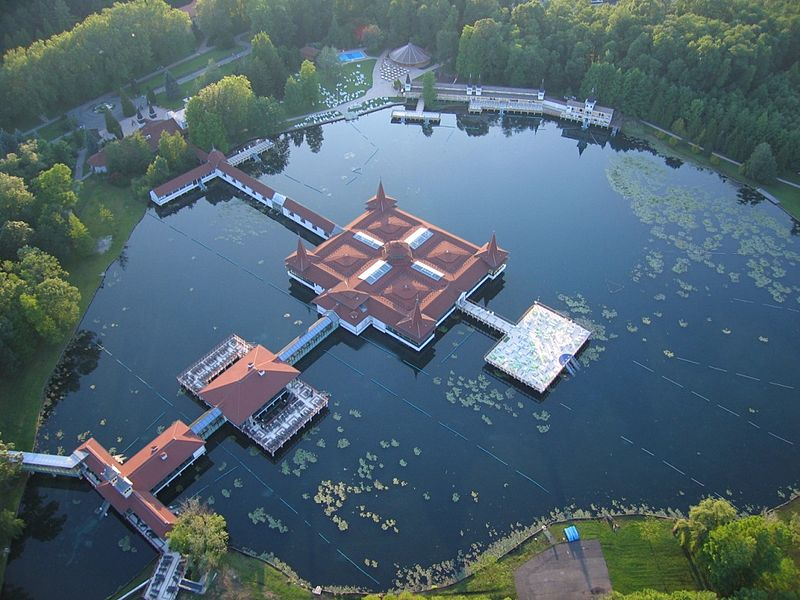
- Lake Hévíz

- Flag Coat of arms

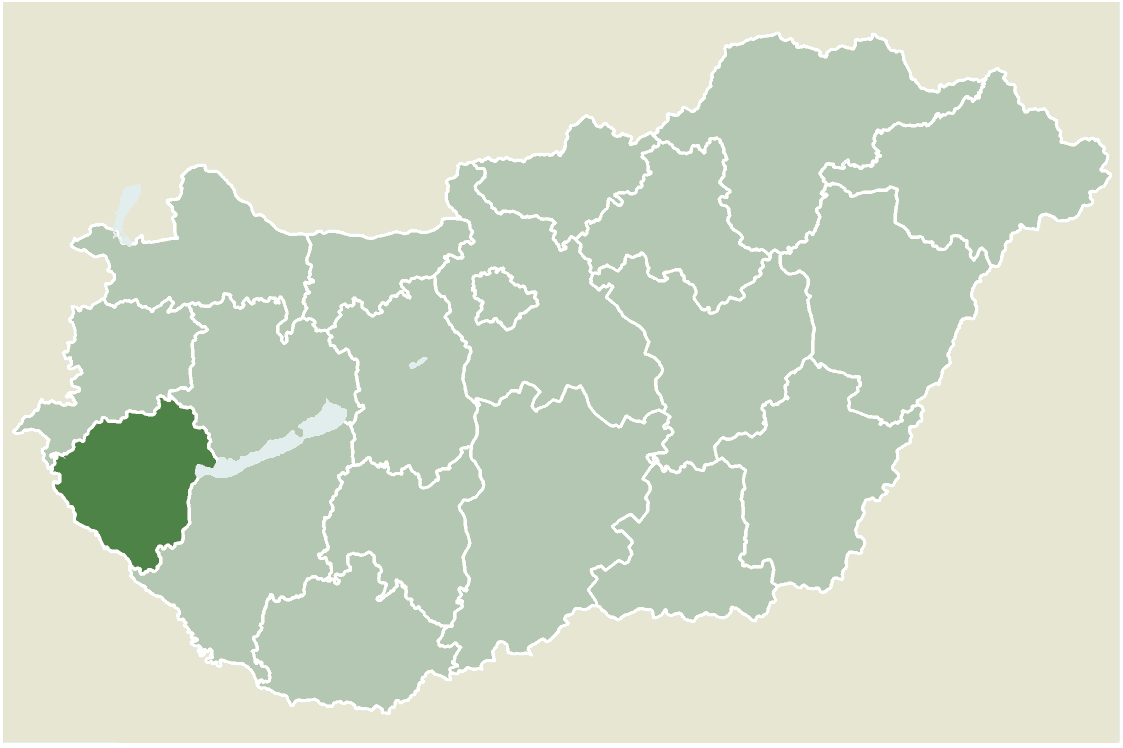
- Location of Zala county in Hungary

- Location of Hévíz
- Coordinates: 46.79234°N 17.18497°E
- Country: Hungary
- County: Zala

Area
  - Total: 8.31 km^{2} (3.21 sq mi)

Population (2015)
  - Total: 4,634
  - Density: 558/km^{2} (1,440/sq mi)
- Time zone: UTC+1 (CET)
  - Summer (DST): UTC+2 (CEST)
- Postal code: 8380
- Area code: 83

Hévíz (Hungarian pronunciation: [ˈheːviːz]) is a spa town in Zala County, Hungary, about 8 kilometres (5 miles) from the city of Keszthely.

== The lake ==
The town is located near Lake Hévíz, Europe's largest thermal lake, and a biologically active natural lake. Its temperature is affected by the combination of hot and cold spring waters, coming from 38 metres (125 feet) underground. The water breaks out from a spring cave, at approximately 500 liters per second, with a temperature of 40 °C (104 °F). The biological stability of the lake is shown by the temperature of the water, which has been similar for years and even on the coldest winter days does not drop below 24 °C (75 °F). That makes bathing possible in the lake year round. In the summer, the water temperature can reach 37 °C (99 °F).

== History ==
The lake's healing properties may have been known for centuries to the people who lived here, as far back as the end of the Stone Age, but were first mentioned in writing as recently as 1731 by Matthias Bel. The city and the bath began developing significantly in the 18th century, related to the Festetics family, who started scientific research about using the water for healing.

== Attractions ==
The town provides facilities for visitors seeking to use the medicinal waters of the lake, including entertainment, hotels, parks, and sports.

- Dr. Schulhof Vilmos Promenade
- Pedestrian Zone
- Building of the City-hall
- Church from the Arpadian age
- Heart of Jesus church
- Holy Spirit Catholic Church
- Calvinist church
- Art Cinema
- Local collections - museum
- Cafeterias
- Egregy Wine Cellars
- Museum of Egregy
- Tomb of the Roman soldier
- Roman ruin garden
- Farmers' market of Hévíz
- Calvary in Egregy
- Water lily nature trail and treetop walkway

== See also ==
- Hévíz Spa
- Lake Hévíz
- Sármellék International Airport, aka Hévíz-Balaton Airport

== Gallery ==
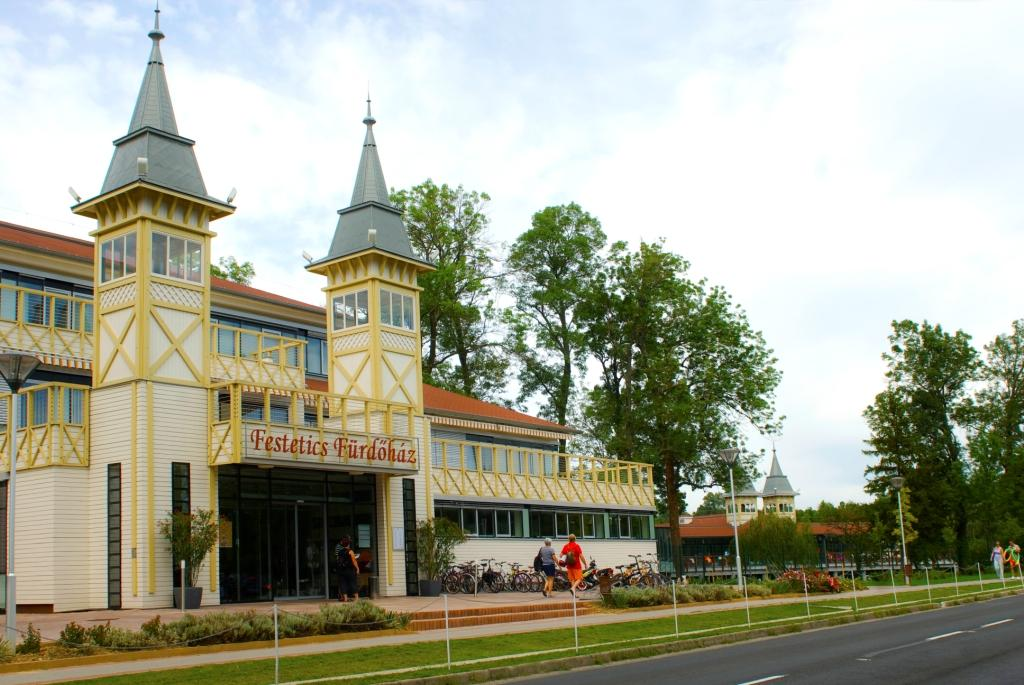

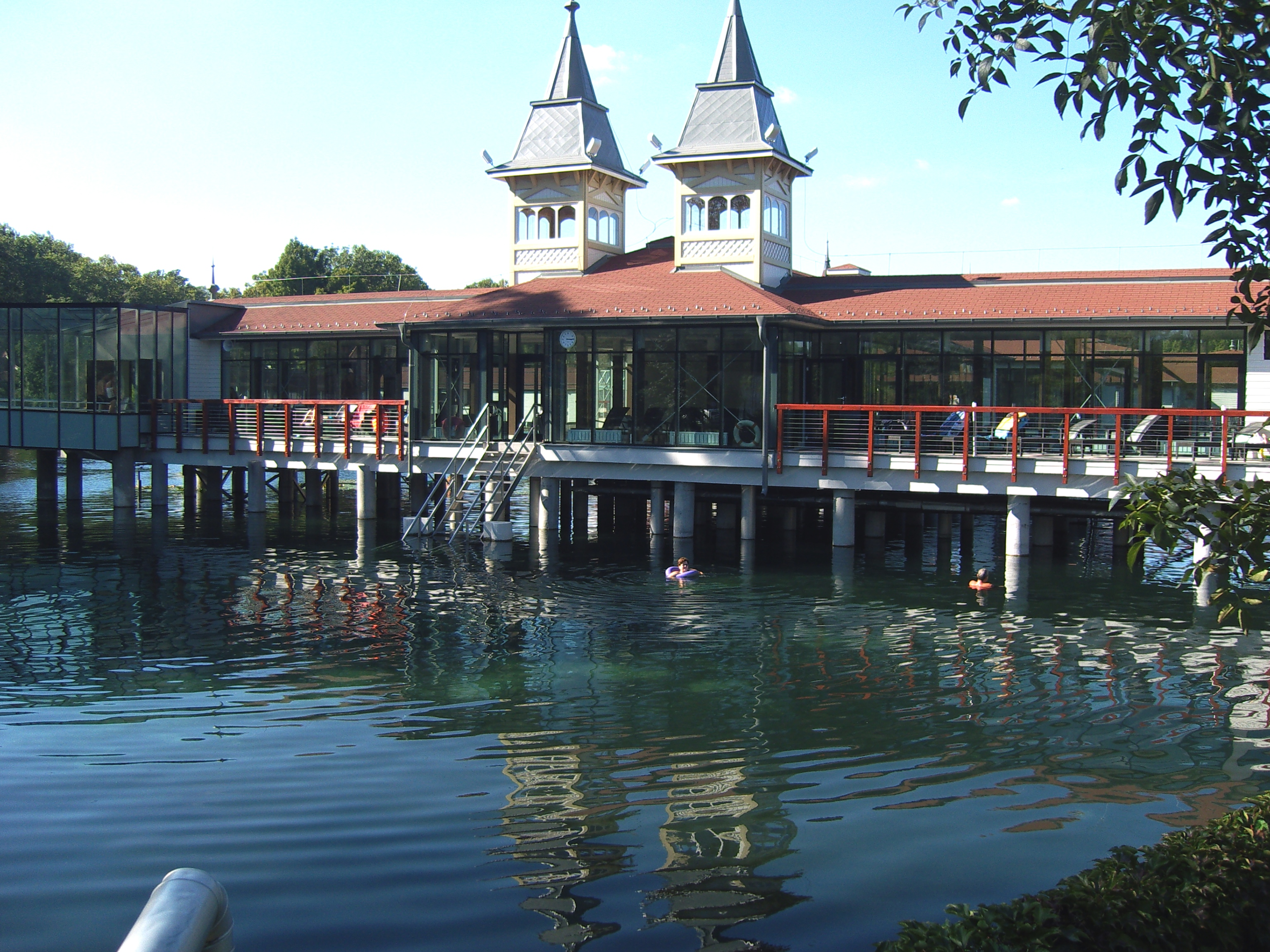

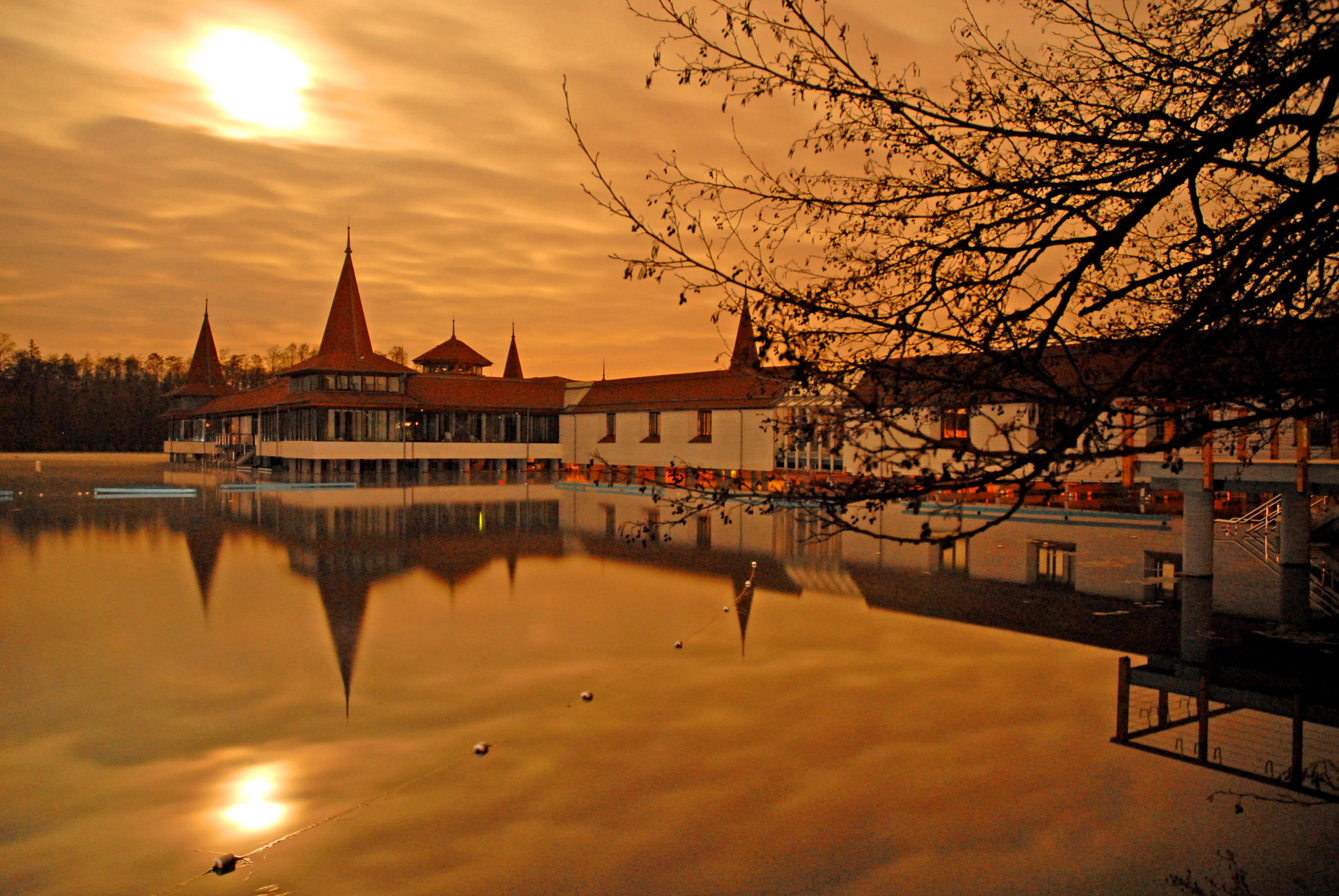

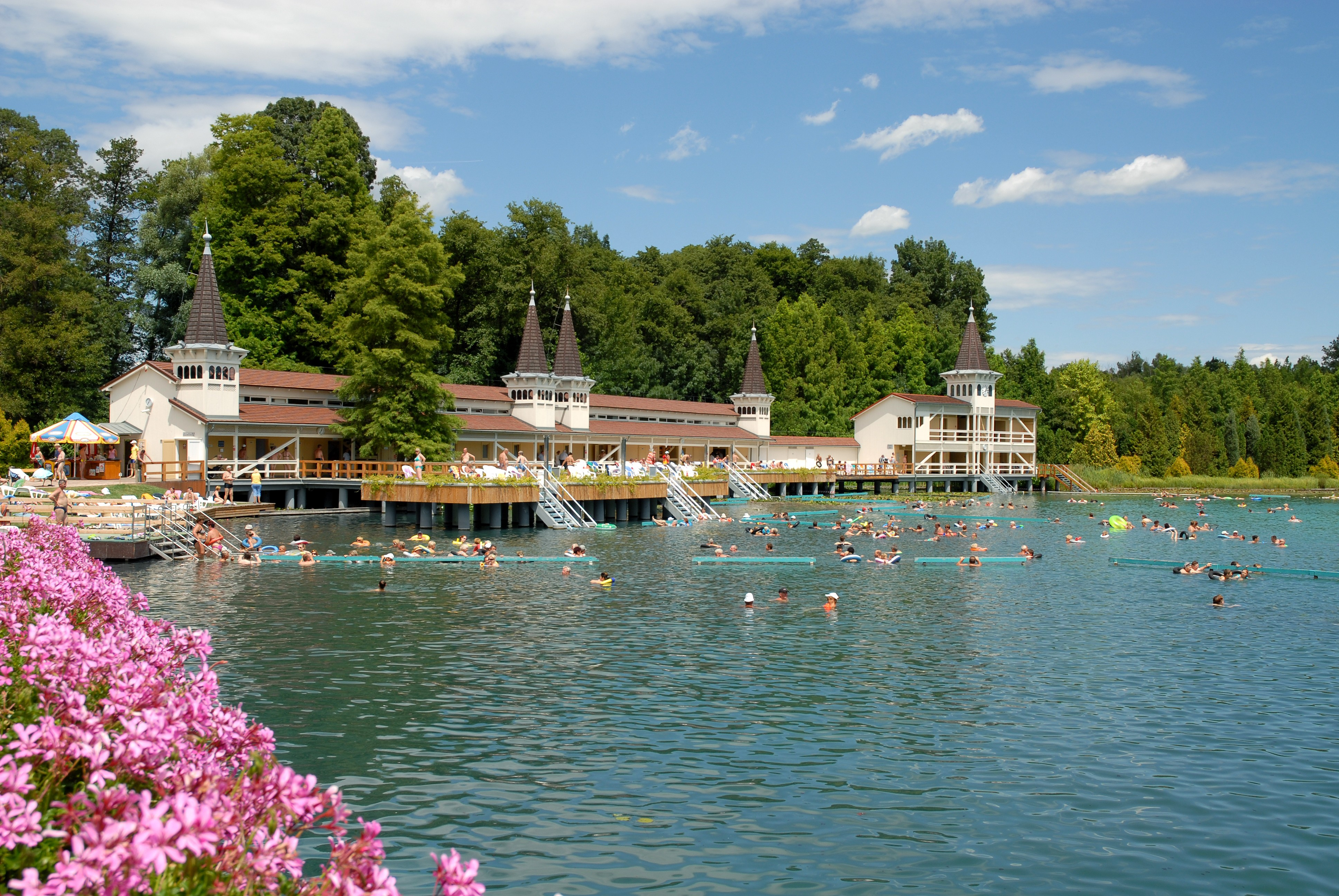

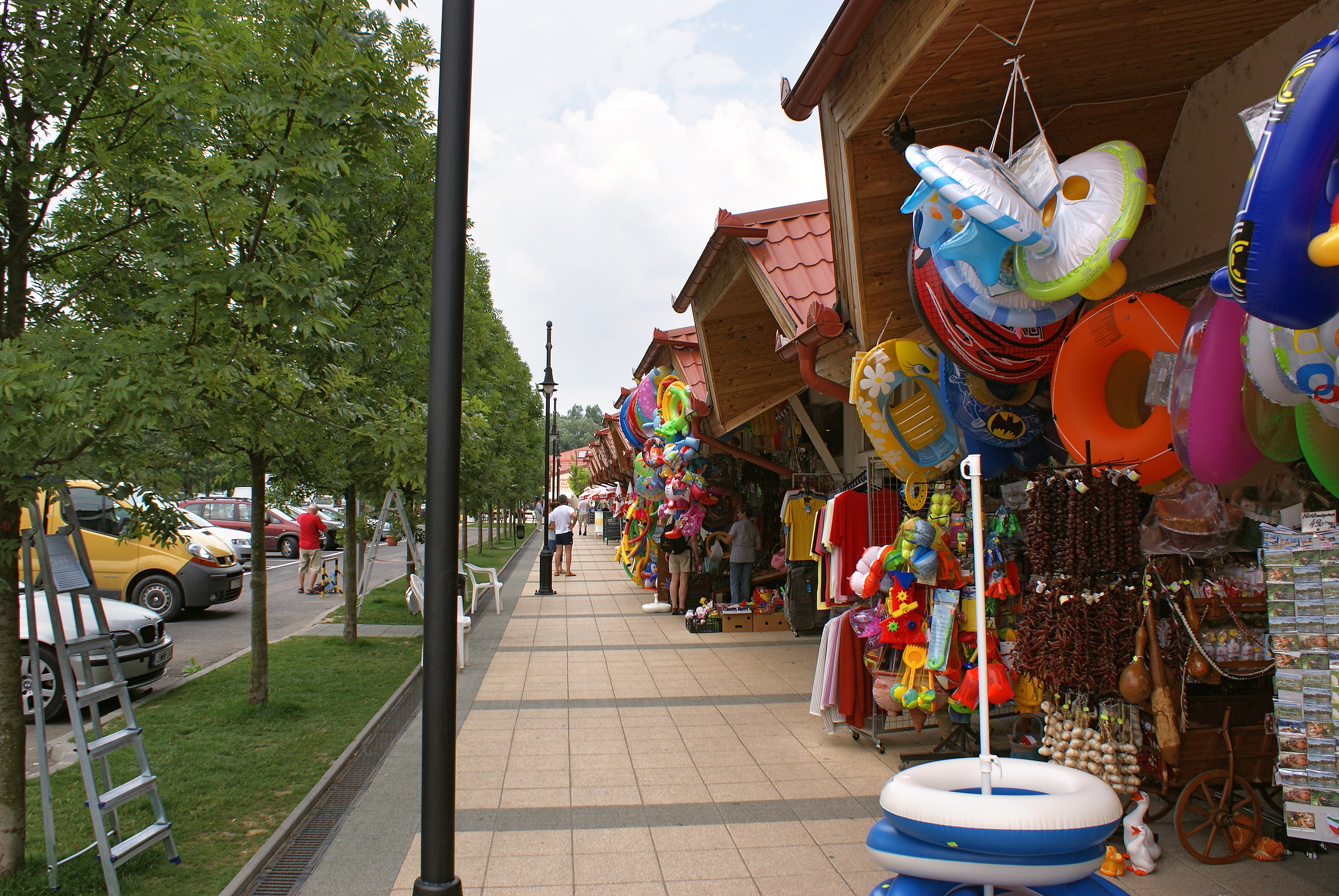

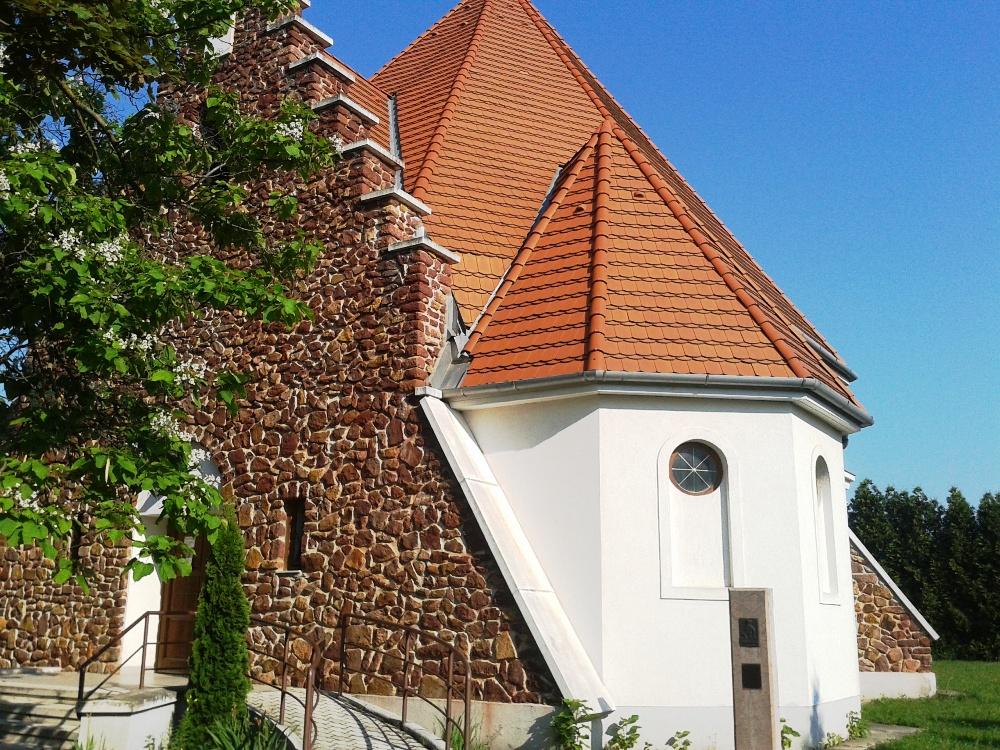

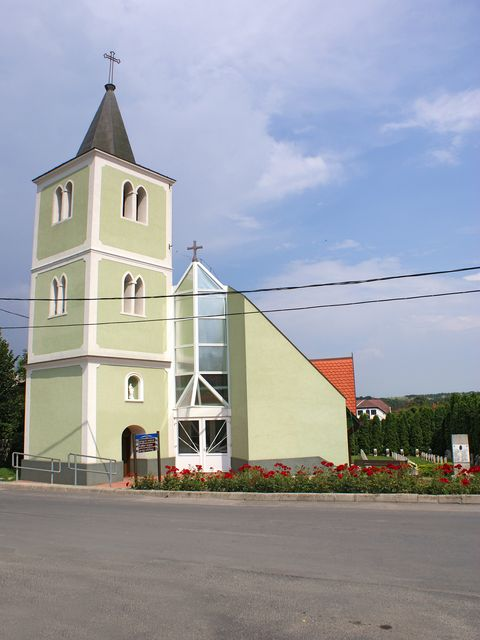

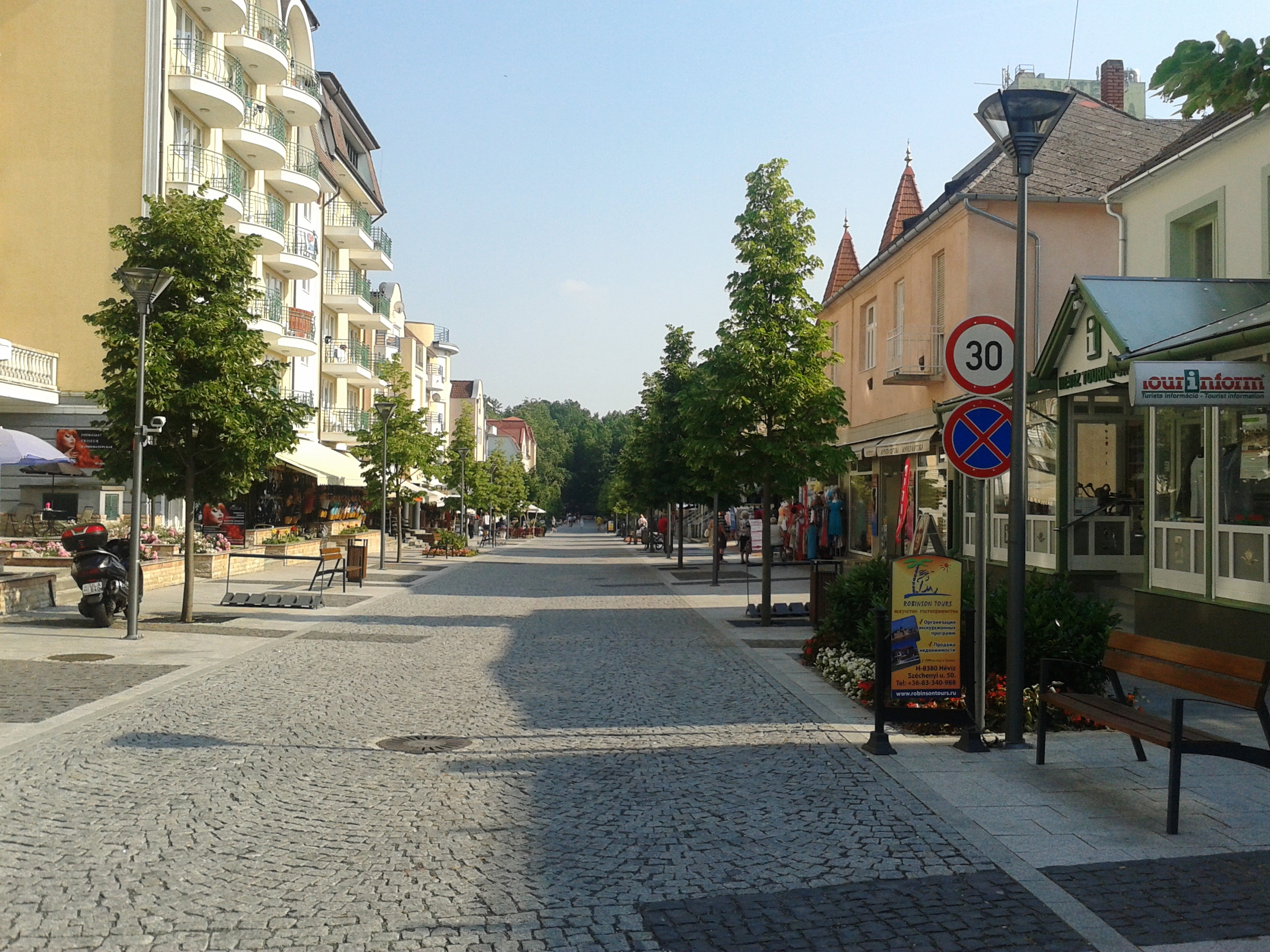

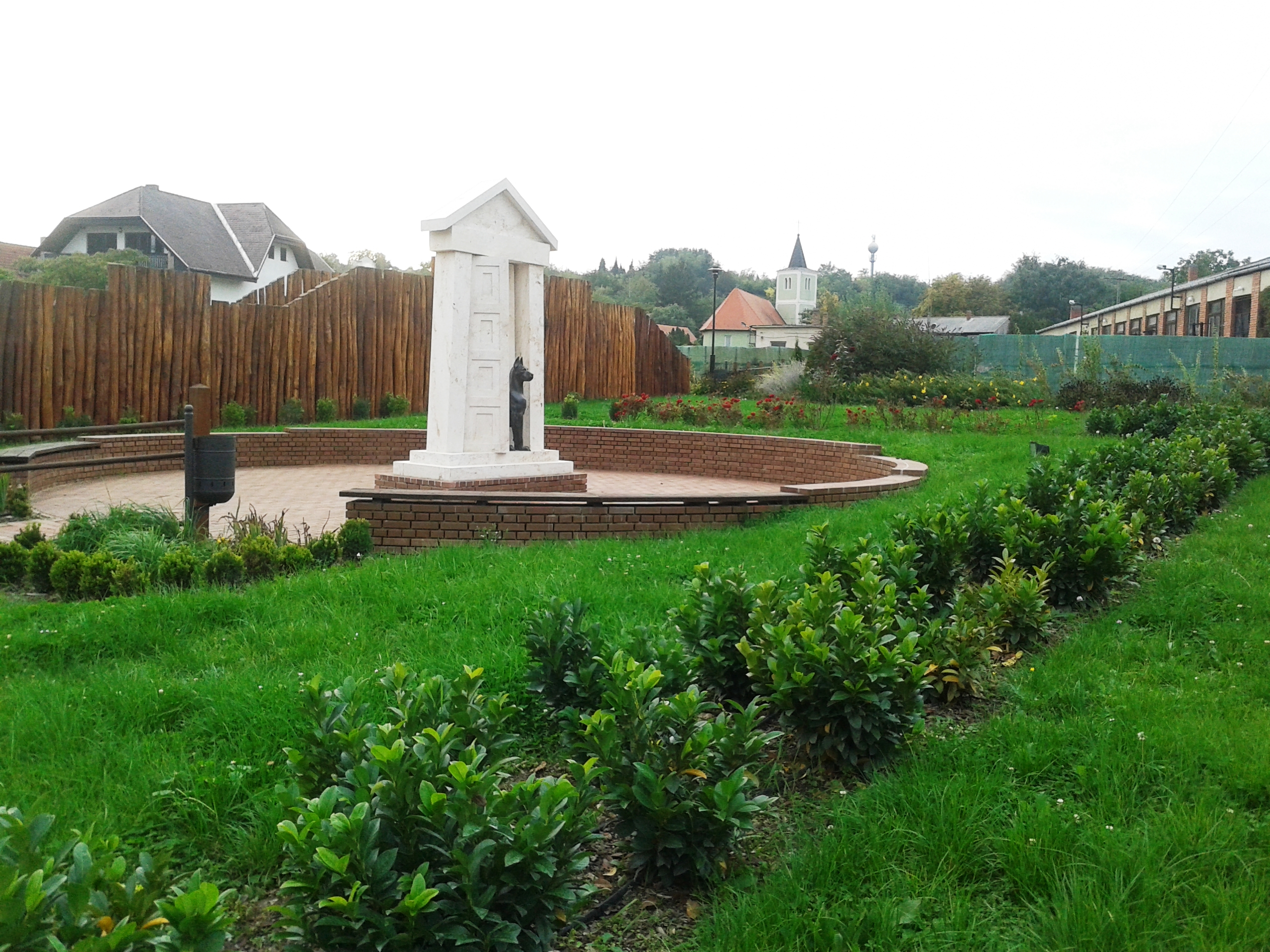

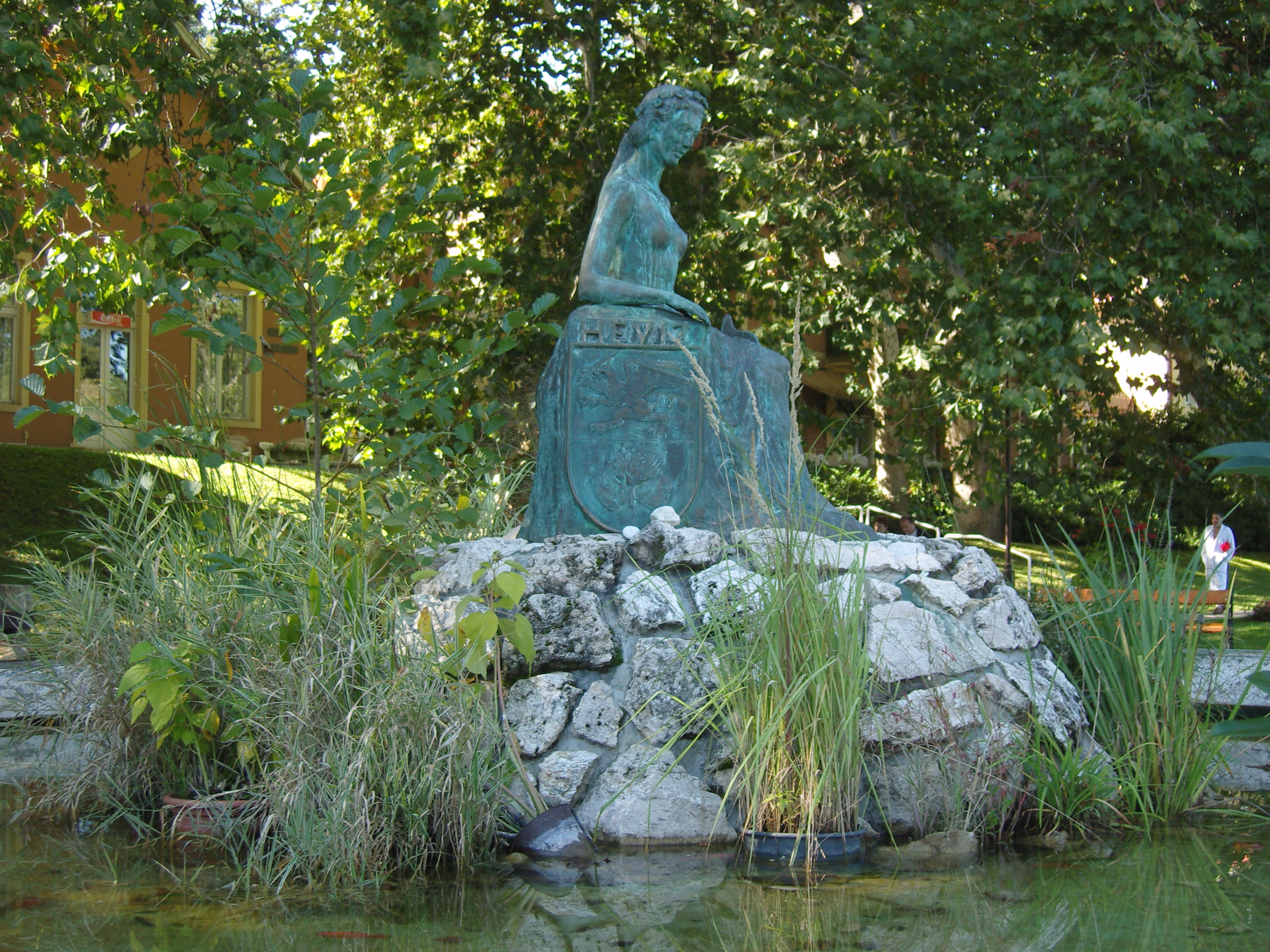
