= Lake Hévíz =

Lake in Hévíz, Zala County, Hungary

- Location within Hungary

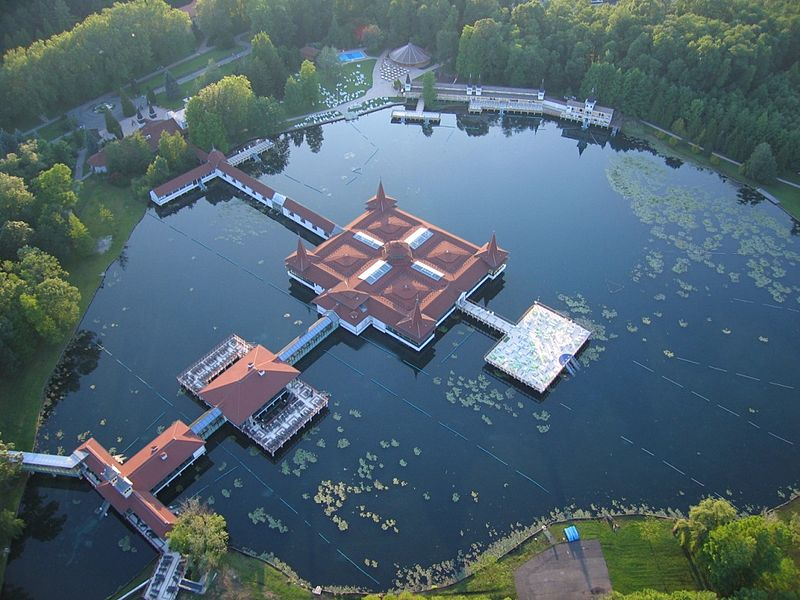
- Medicinal Bath of Hévíz
- Location: Hévíz
- Coordinates: 46°47′14″N 17°11′35″E
- Type: Oligotrophic lake
- Primary inflows: 500 L/s (6,600 imp gal/min)
- Primary outflows: Canal Hévízi-csatorna, Canal Páhoki-patak, Zala River
- Basin countries: Hungary
- Surface area: 47,500 m^{2} (511,000 sq ft)
- Max. depth: 38 m (125 ft)
- Residence time: 3.5 days
- Surface elevation: 109.39 m (358.9 ft)

Lake Hévíz is located in Hévíz, Hungary, near the western end of Lake Balaton, 8 kilometres (5 mi) from Keszthely. Hévíz means 'hot water'.

It is the largest swimmable European thermal lake, with its waters originating from two springs in a 38 m (125 ft) deep cave. The flow of water is very strong and the water in the lake is completely replenished every three and a half days. The springs are the last in a south-west line of karst waters stretching along the Transdanubian Mountains. According to the town's official website, the lake is 2 to 38 m deep and formed about 20,000–22,000 years ago, at about the same time as Lake Balaton; analyses suggest that the cold water from its spring is about 8,000 years old and the hot medicinal water about 12,000 years old.

== Ecology ==
The main source spring provides 90% of volume and is warmer at 41 °C (106 °F) with the remainder of the water coming from a 26 °C (79 °F) spring. The usual lake temperature is between 33 to 35 °C (91 to 95 °F) in the summer and down to 22 °C (72 °F) in the winter, where a mist may form above the surface. The lake is oligotrophic as its waters have a low nutrient content. In the early 1980s the Transdanubian karst water level was lowered due to local bauxite mines and the flow rate of the Hévíz thermal spring decreased substantially causing concern. However the closure of the relevant mines allowed the water flow to recover. Embankment reconstruction was undertaken in 2011 aiming to enhance the water supply to dependent wetland habitats, but this did temporarily disturb the lake ecosystem. It has a peat bed, up to 8 m (26 ft) thick.

=== Flora and fauna ===
The fauna and flora are unique in Lake Hévíz due to the temperature and chemical composition of the water, which contains carbonic acid, calcium, magnesium, hydrogen carbonate, reduced sulfuric compounds as well as oxygen in solution. Several species have so far been found only in this lake.

Water lilies are a major tourist draw since Nymphaea rubra was introduced by Lovassy Sándor in 1898 with multiple species and varieties being now found in the lake and its outflow. Because of the warmth the water lily pests Galerucella nymphaeae and Rhopalosiphum nymphaeae are a major challenge, causing the lily leaves to go brown, and be smaller than otherwise, making regular pest control practices necessary. The plant parts above the lake surface are cut down when infected strongly, removed to shore where when covered with black plastic, the heat kills the pests.

=== Microscopic organisms of the lake ===
Most common Cyanobacteria are filamentous blue-green algae (Oscillatoria princeps, O. tenuis, O. jasoruensis, O. chlorina, Spirulina major). Half of the blue species are thermophile, stenoterm ones. There are two thermophile blue green alga species (Pseudanabaena papillaterminata, Pseudanabaena crassa) of which Lake Hévíz is the only Hungarian habitat.

Bacterial tektons are typical of the lake. The deepest part of the lake is covered mostly by Thiothrix sp. and Beggiatoa sp. from a depth of 1.5 m (4 ft 11 in) to the opening of the springcave. These together with the bacterium species play an important role in the lake's sulfur cycle.

Actinomycetes (Streptomyces sp., Micromonospora sp.) also occur in the lake. Micromonospora heviziensis, for instance, a very powerful protein and cellulose decomposer, is known only from this lake. Microbispora amethystogenes on the other hand, which accumulates iodine in its cells, is to be found in only few lakes in the world. This latter species has not been found in the lake since the 1980s as a result of excessive mining. Changing environment affected other bacteria as well. Micromonospora carbonacea and M. chalcea were not detected in the 1990s. Actinomycetes communities have become dominated by Micromonospora purpureochromogenes, while M. heviziensis was suppressed. Antibiotic-secreting Streptomyces are likely to be present.

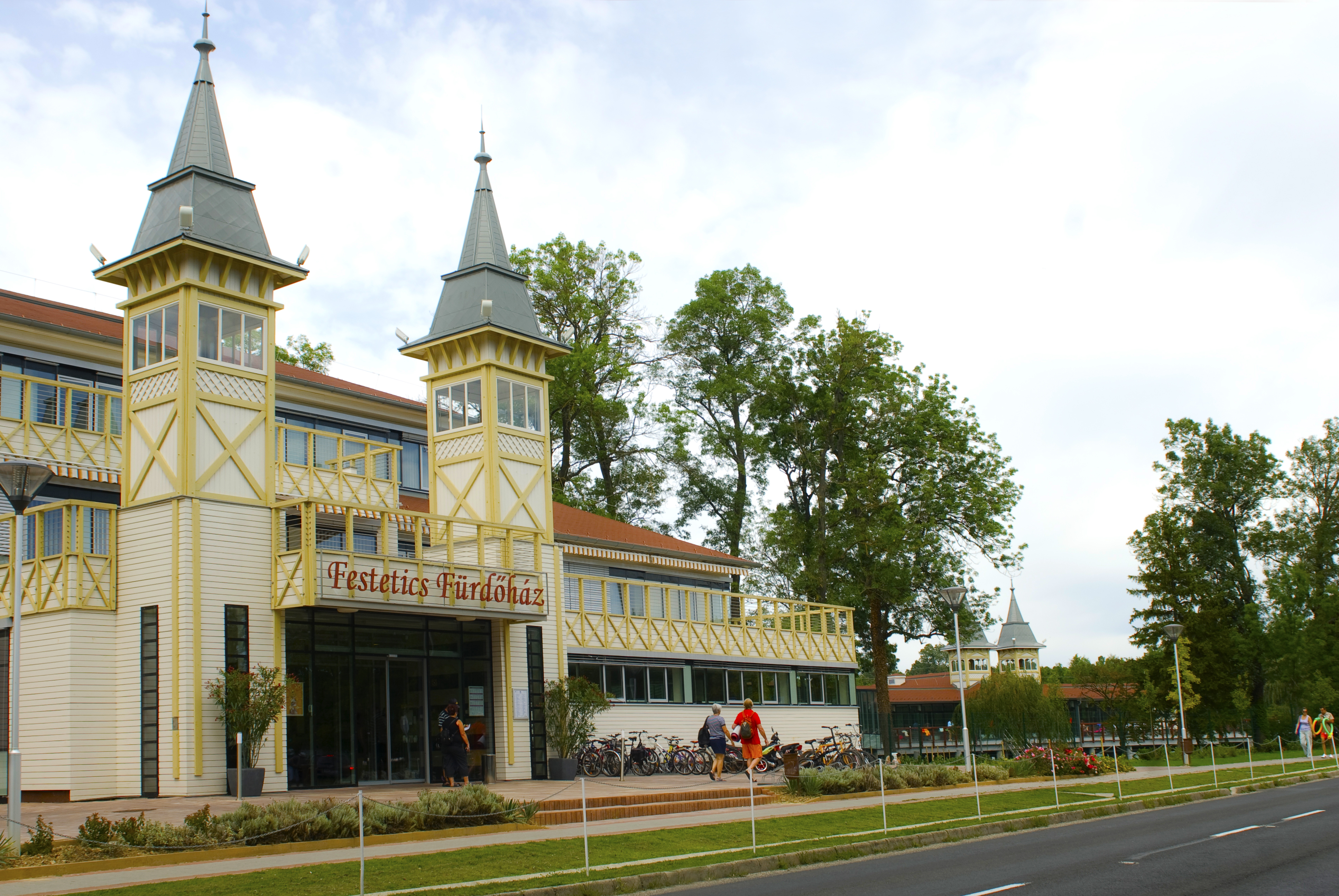

More recently Actinobacteria, Chloroflexi, Cyanobacteria, Thiobacillus and class Alpha-, Beta- and Gamma-proteobacteria have been confirmed.

== Medicinal properties ==
The waters are reported to be beneficial to patients with rheumatic diseases and locomotor disorders, among others. The mud from the peat bed may also have beneficial health properties. There is a health tourism industry based on balneotherapy in the area.

== See also ==
- Hévíz Spa
