= Hévíz Spa =

Hospital

Coordinates: 46.7860867°N 17.19116°E

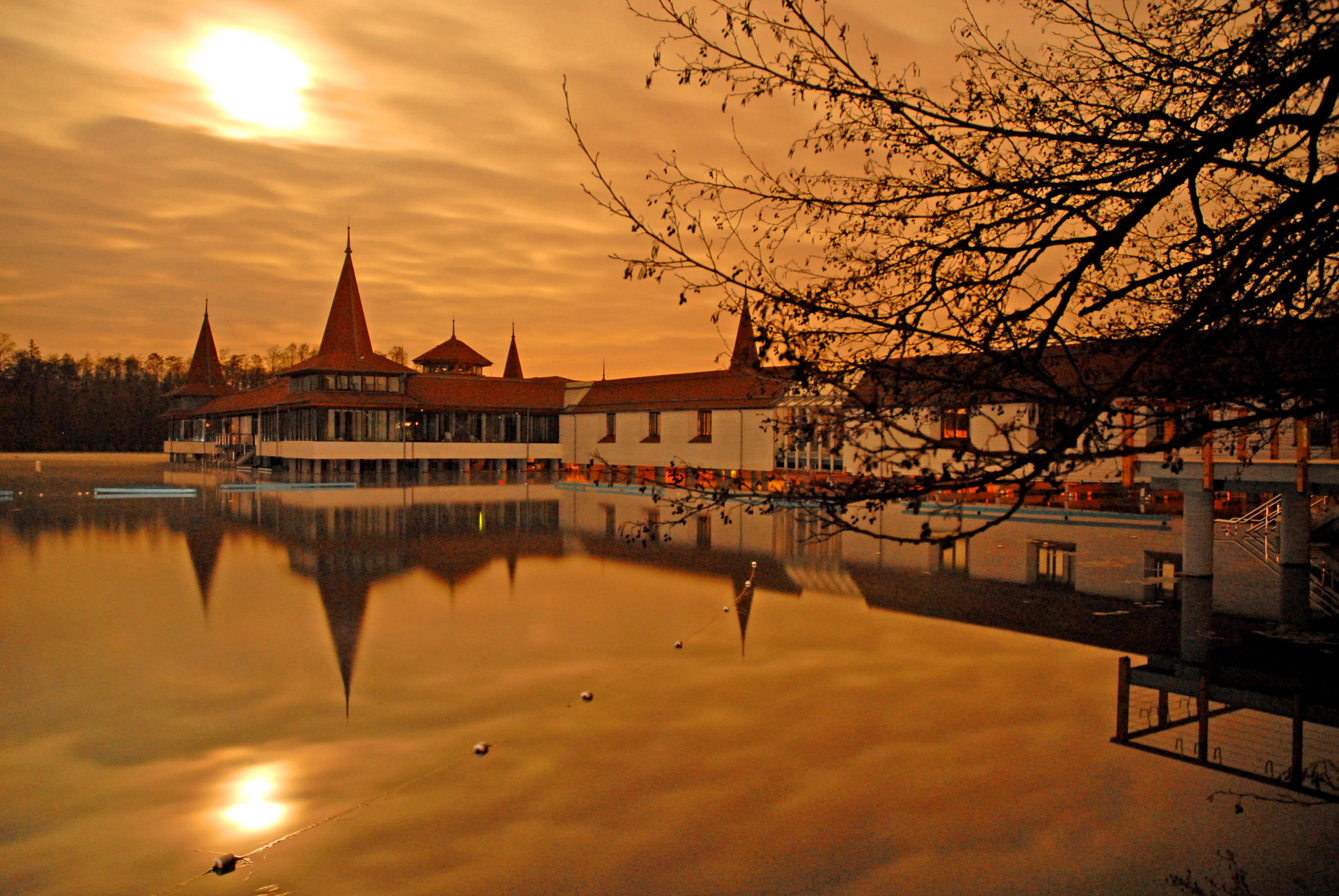
Hévíz - autumn

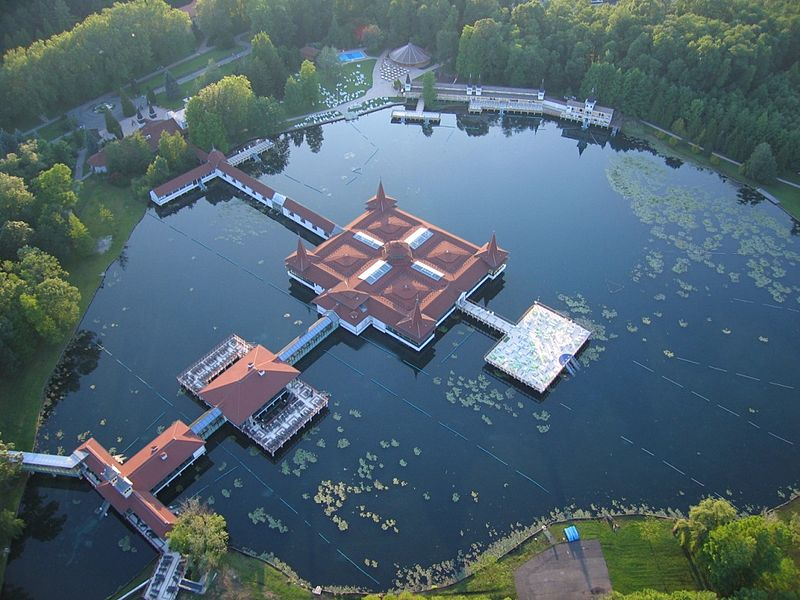
Medicinal Bath Hévíz

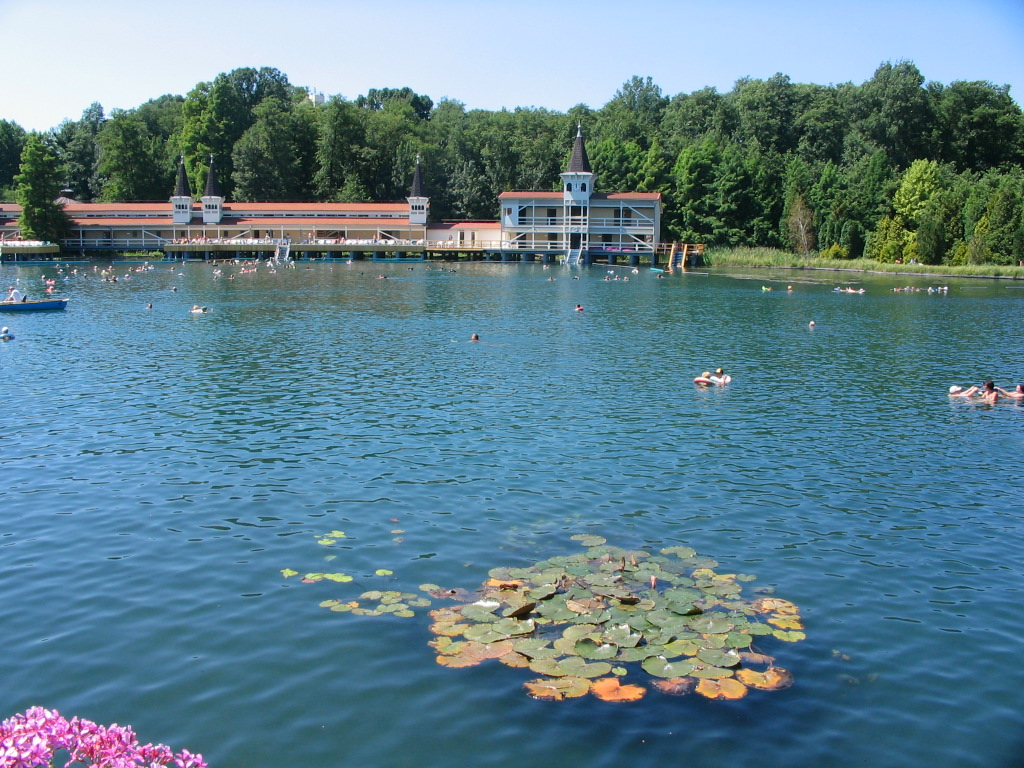
Lake Hévíz, summer 2006.

Hévíz Spa and the Szent András Hospital, Hévíz (English: St. Andrew's State Hospital for Rheumatology and Rehabilitation) is a destination spa in Hungary. It is located in Hévíz, on the shores of the lake of the same name. Hévíz–Balaton Airport is approximately 12 km (7 mi) from the town. Hévíz means 'hot water'.

== History ==
The first archeological evidence is from 7500 years ago. The Romans had villas in Hévíz, have left an altar stone, sacred to Jupiter, cemeteries, and used the lake to manufacture leather. Discoveries from the Migration Period (c. 300 to 600 AD), suggest that the migrant German and Slavic population used the lake as well. A document from 1259, mentions Alsópáhok, a neighbouring settlement to Hévíz associated with dealing with leather. In 1328 the name “Hévíz” first appears in a document mentioning a swamp called mud, a place for fishing and the spelling Hewyz. After 1566 while the Ottoman Empire occupied the area of south of Lake Balaton, its water level rose making the area more swampy and difficult to access.

In 1731 Matthias Bel, was the first to mention health treatment related to the lake. Ferenc Szláby, a graduated doctor and physician of county Zala, made a scientific description of the composition of the lake in 1769 at the direction of Queen Maria Theresa.

The lake and its surroundings became the property of the Festetics family in the middle of the 18th century, who started its development as a spa. Earl György (I.) Festetics (between 1795 and 1797) built a thermal wooden bathing house on a float over the outflow. After the earl's death in 1819 the development of Hévíz stopped. In March 1868, György (II.) Festetics began building the bathing resort suitable for guests. The bath looked more or less as it does today. In 1866 the mirrorbath was built.

In 1905 Vencel Reischl, a brewery owner from Keszthely, became the tenant of the bath and remained so for 35 years. Reischl replaced the hotels, restaurants, and buildings, and the entrance of the bath was finished in 1911 together with the Zander Institution. The number of visitors increased significantly, and the facilities expanded considerably as more doctors moved to the site to practice various forms of therapy.

Between 1944 and 1946 the buildings were used as a hospital, first by the German then by the Soviet army. In 1948 it fell under state ownership; the State Medicinal Bath, Hévíz, was established by the Ministry of Health on 1 January 1952. The number of visitors tripled then quadrupled, and the machinery of the hospital and the treatments were modernised with a covered pool as the most modern facility of its time constructed in 1968. On 3 March 1986, the central buildings of the bath (in the lake) burnt down. In September 1989 the reconstruction of the destroyed parts was completed.

Further reconstruction of the park and buildings continued up to 2008. Today the area of the institution is 620,000 square metres, although some is closed for renovation.

== See also ==
- Lake Hévíz
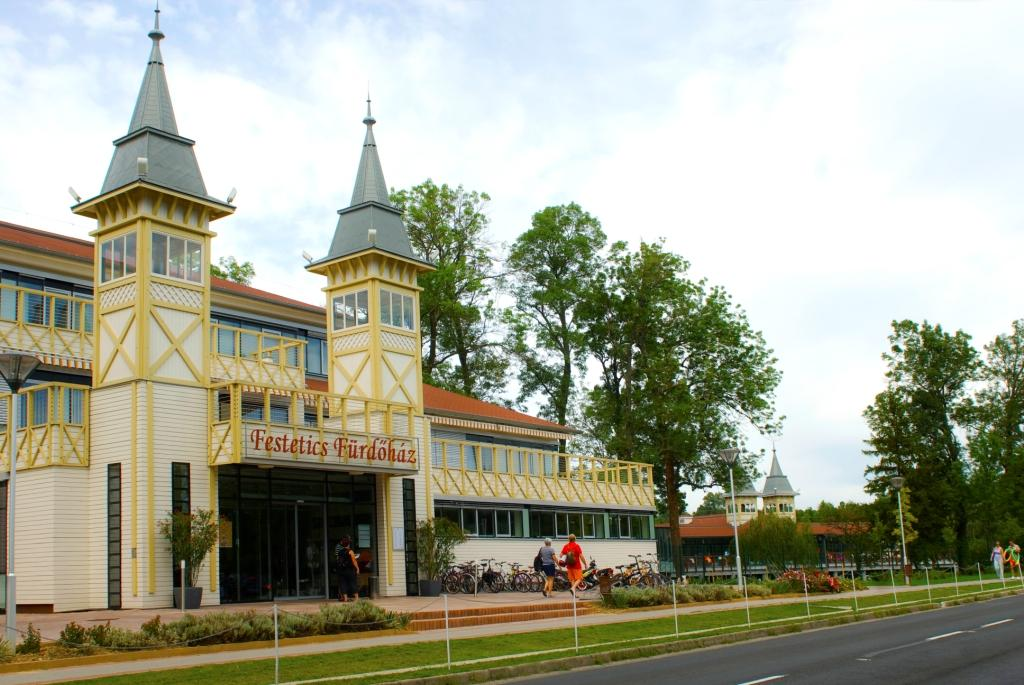

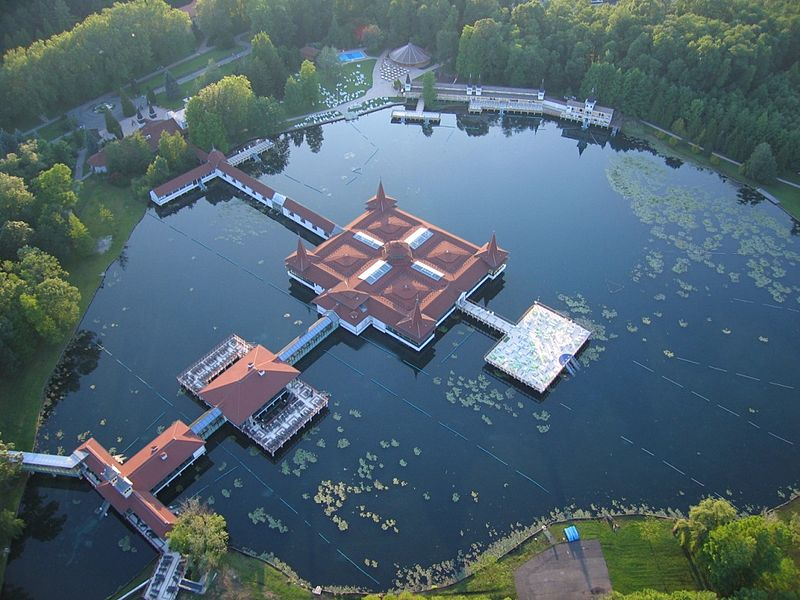

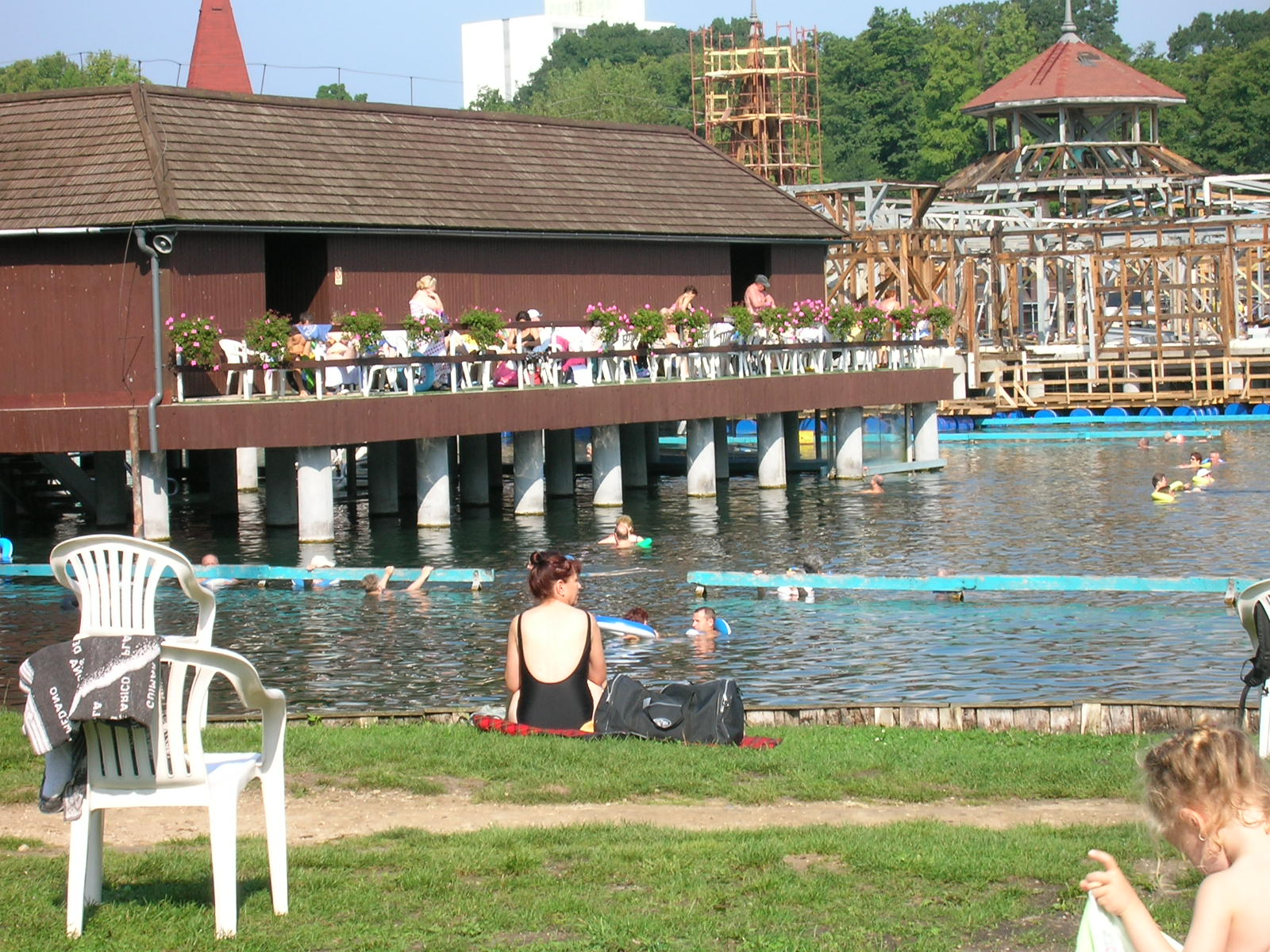

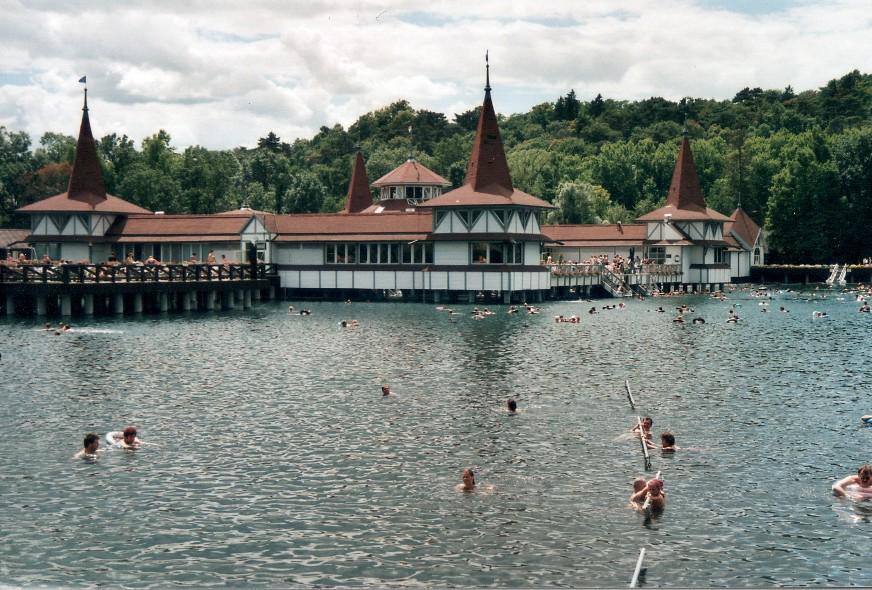

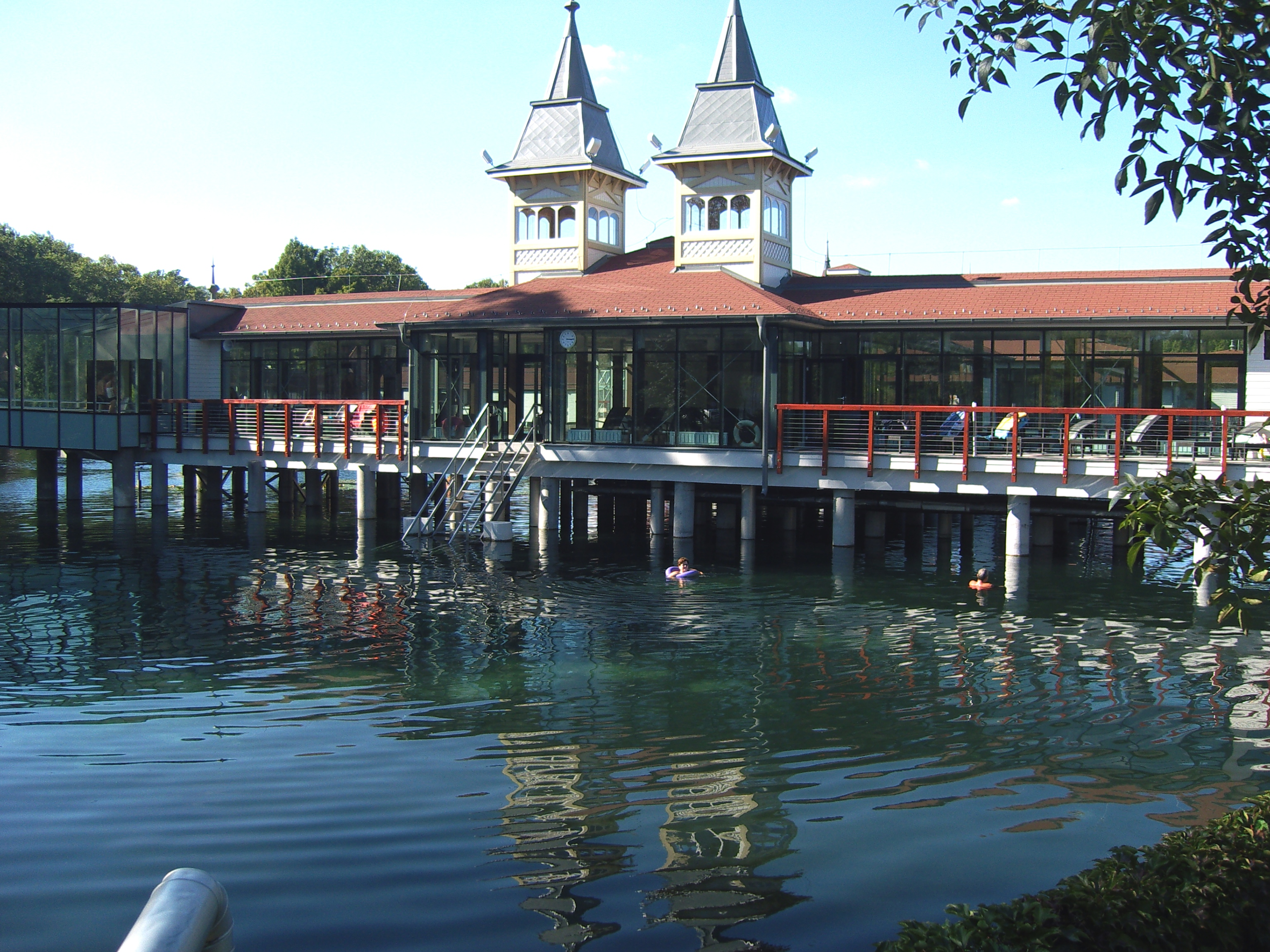

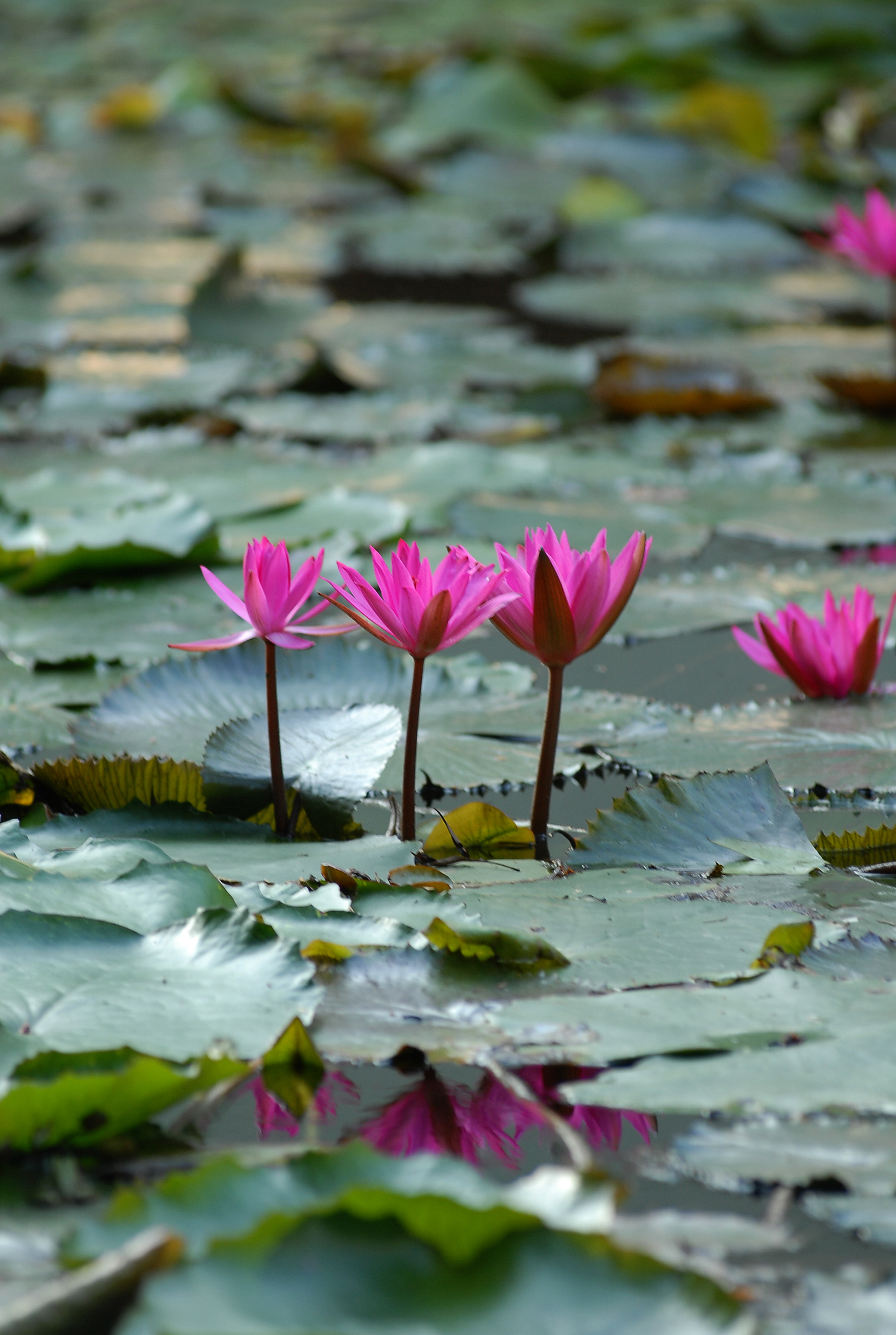

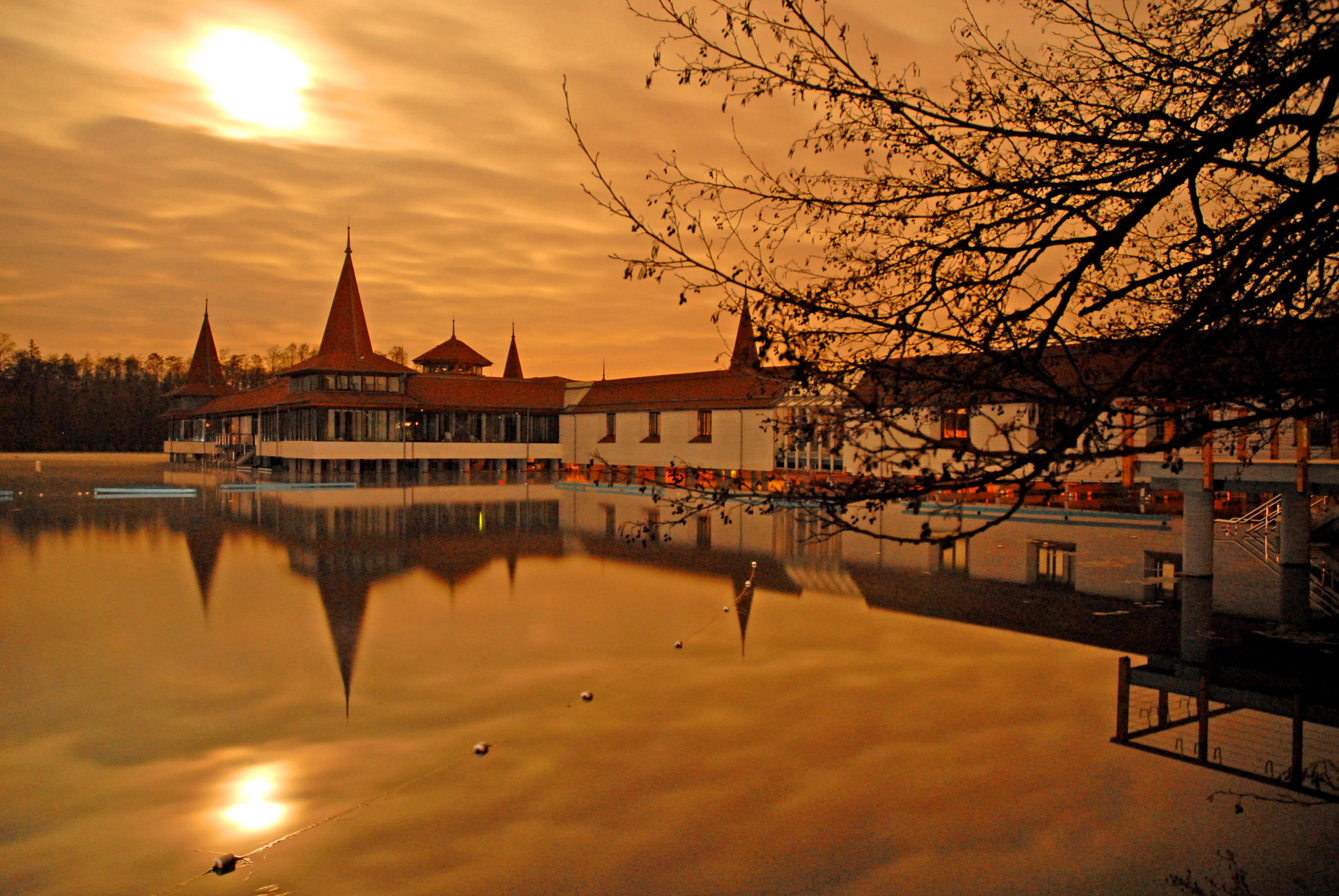

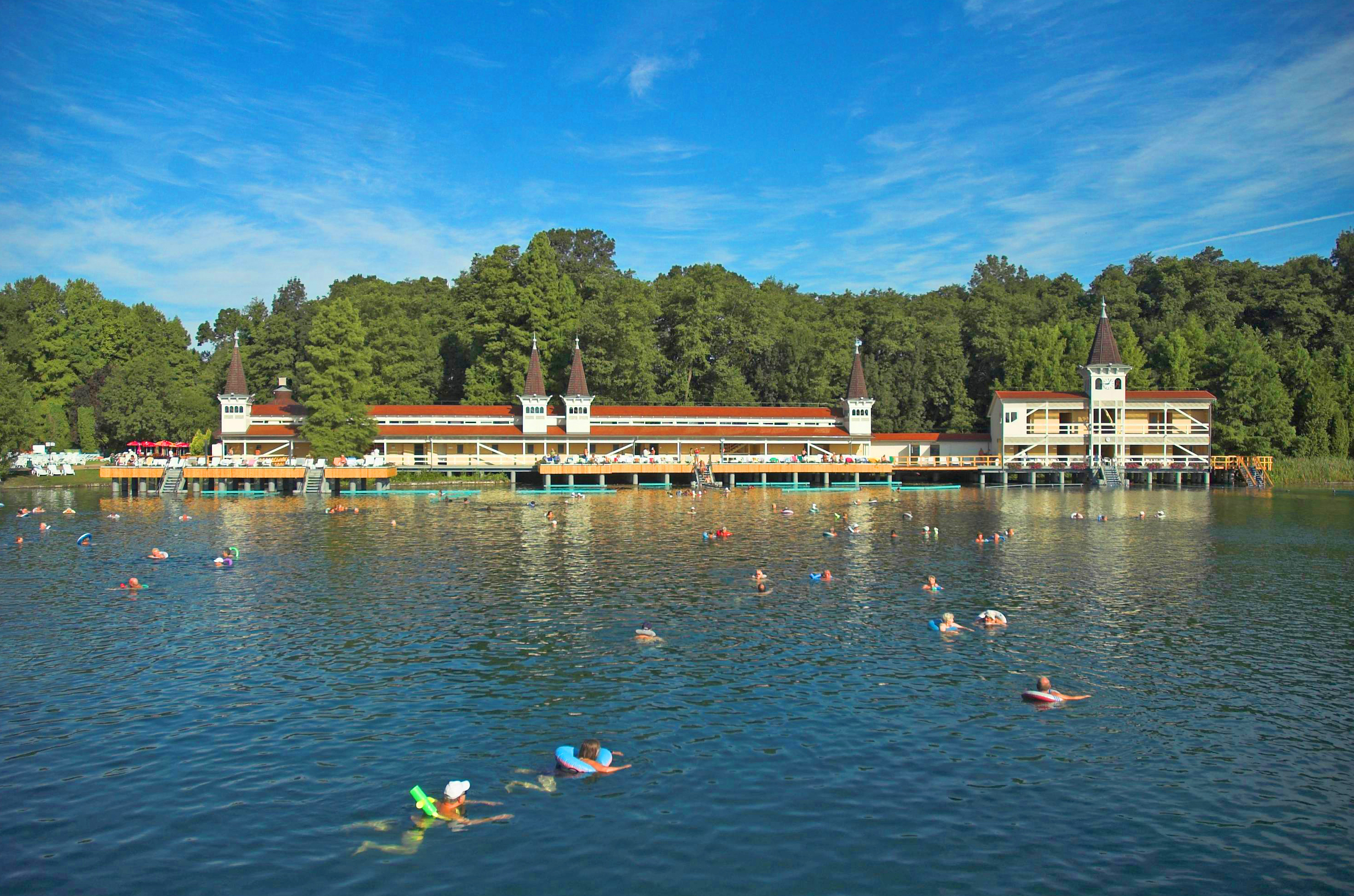

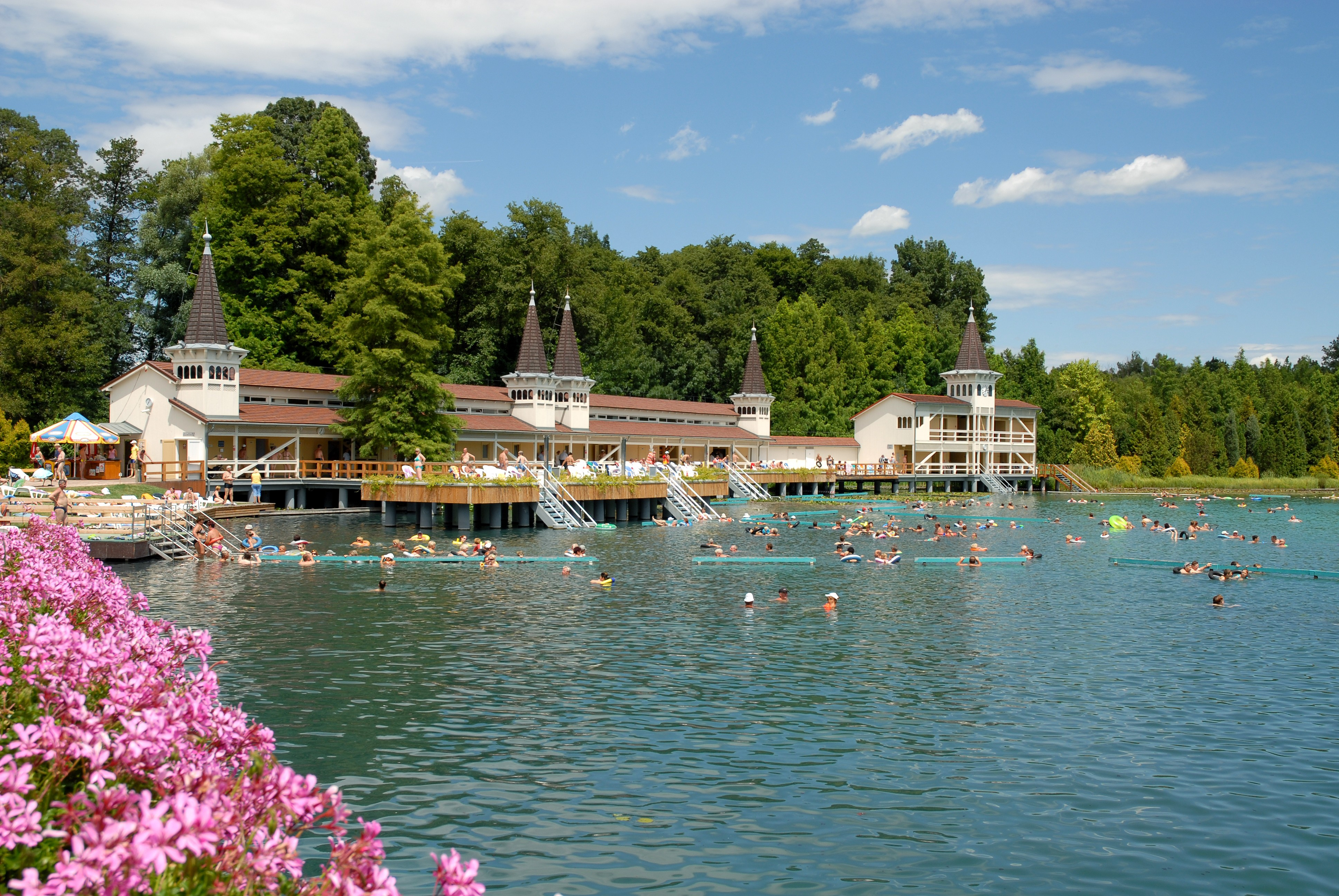
