= Methylophaga thiooxydans =

Scientific classification
- Domain: Bacteria
- Kingdom: Pseudomonadati
- Phylum: Pseudomonadota
- Class: Gammaproteobacteria
- Order: Thiotrichales
- Family: Piscirickettsiaceae
- Genus: Methylophaga
- Species: M. thiooxydans

Binomial name
- Methylophaga thiooxydans (Boden et al. 2011)

Type strain
- DSM 22068^{T}

Species of bacterium

Methylophaga thiooxydans is a methylotrophic bacterium that requires high salt concentrations for growth. It was originally isolated from a culture of the algae Emiliania huxleyi, where it grows by breaking down dimethylsulfoniopropionate from E. hexleyi into dimethylsulfide and acrylate. M. thiooxydans has been implicated as a dominant organism in phytoplankton blooms, where it consumes dimethylsulfide, methanol and methyl bromide released by dying phytoplankton. It was also identified as one of the dominant organisms present in the plume following the Deepwater Horizon oil spill, and was identified as a major player in the breakdown of methanol in coastal surface water in the English Channel.

== Metabolism ==
M. thiooxydans is a chemolithoheterotroph. Emiliania huxleyi produces dimethylsulfoniopropionate as an osmolyte to allow it to grow at the elevated salt concentrations in seawater, which is broken down by bacteria in the mixed-culture to release dimethylsulfide and acrylate - some bacteria can use the former as a carbon and energy source - taking some of the carbon up into biomass and mineralising the remainder into carbon dioxide and sulfate or thiosulfate. Most bacteria that degrade dimethylsulfide (including some Methylophaga strains) as a source of carbon leave the sulfur behind in the fully oxidised form of sulfate, whereas Methylophaga sulfidovorans forms thiosulfate as the end-product of growth. M. thiooxydans performs an additional step, using the cytochrome c-linked thiosulfate dehydrogenase to dimerise thiosulfate into tetrathionate, which yields electrons that can be transferred to the respiratory chain and used to produce ATP. The same is true for both the endogenous thiosulfate formed in this way or exogenous thiosulfate from the environment - in both cases, electrons from the thiosulfate dehydrogenase reduce cytochrome c and are then transferred to a cbb_{3}-type cytochrome c oxidase, from which they are transferred to molecular oxygen, which - as the terminal electron acceptor is reduced to water. The respiratory chain of this species contains a bc_{1} complex, unlike Escherichia coli and the flavoprotein succinate dehydrogenase, which is not always present in methylotrophic or autotrophic bacteria since they do not have the complete Krebs cycle, and instead have the partial cycle dubbed Smith's horseshoe - in the case of Methylophaga species, the fumarase and succinate dehydrogenase that are often missing are present and permit growth on a limited range of carbohydrates rather than just one-carbon compounds such as methanol or dimethylsulfide, which are metabolised not via Krebs cycle but via the ribulose monophosphate pathway (RuMP pathway, also known as the Quayle pathway). This species has a somewhat restricted range of carbon sources, including methanol, dimethylsulfide and thiophene-3-carboxylate

== Research ==
The genome sequence was completed in 2011 and was the first genome sequence of a marine methylotroph. The genome is around 3MBp in length, and has a G+C fraction of 45.9 mol%.

== History ==
M. thiooxydans was isolated in 2010 from a culture of the coccolithophore Emiliania huxleyi after enrichment culture using dimethylsulfide as the sole source of carbon and the sole electron donor, with molecular oxygen as the terminal electron acceptor.
