= Methylophaga muralis =

Scientific classification
- Domain: Bacteria
- Kingdom: Pseudomonadati
- Phylum: Pseudomonadota
- Class: Gammaproteobacteria
- Order: Thiotrichales
- Family: Piscirickettsiaceae
- Genus: Methylophaga
- Species: M. muralis

Binomial name
- Methylophaga muralis Doronina et al., 2011

Type strain
- Kr3; VKM B-2303; NCIMB 13993

Synonyms
- Methylophaga murata Doronina et al. 2005

Species of bacterium

Methylophaga muralis is a species of Pseudomonadota. It is capable of surviving in saline and alkaline environments and can obtain its carbon from methanol. This species was originally discovered in crumbling marble in the Moscow Kremlin; it has also been found in a soda lake in Buryatia.

== Taxonomic history and etymology ==
This species was discovered in scrapings from deteriorating marble monuments in the crypts of the Moscow Kremlin. It was originally named M. murata in its 2005 species description by Russian Academy of Sciences microbiologist Yury Alexandrovich Trotsenko and colleagues, but was renamed in 2011 to M. muralis. The type strain, Kr3, was deposited in the All-Russia Collection of Microorganisms (VKM) and the National Collection of Industrial and Marine Bacteria (NCIMB) culture collections.

The specific epithet muralis is a Latin adjective meaning "of or belonging to a wall". Its original specific epithet, murata, means "surrounded by walls".

== Distribution and habitat ==
The type strain Kr3 was extracted in Moscow from marble with a pH of 9.1. M. muralis is an example of an endolith, being able to live on rock. Another strain, named Bur 1, was isolated from a soda lake in Khilganta, Buryatia, Russia.

The bacteria grows in temperatures of 0–42 °C (32–108 °F), a pH of 6–11, and a sodium chloride concentration of 0.05–3 moles per liter; although the optimal habitat is a temperature of 20–32 °C (68–90 °F), a pH of 8–9, and a sodium chloride concentration of 0.5–1.5 mol/L. It can survive being heated to 70 °C (158 °F), being frozen, or being freeze-dried. As this species is adapted to saline and alkaline environments, it is considered both halophilic and alkaliphilic.

== Description and biology ==
M. muralis cells are rod-shaped, with a width of 0.7 μm and a length of 1.7–2.0 μm. Each cell has a flagellum at one of its poles.

This species is methylotrophic, meaning it can utilize carbon from one-carbon molecules like methanol and methylamine, although it also obtains carbon from trimethylamine, and fructose. It is an aerobic organism; in addition to requiring oxygen, it also needs vitamin B_{12} and sodium ions to grow. It is gram-negative, like all Pseudomonadota. Reproduction is done via binary fission; it does not make spores.

Its main fatty acids are palmitic acid, palmitoleic acid, and octadecanoic acid. The main phospholipids are phosphatidylethanolamine, phosphatidylglycerol, and cardiolipin. Ectoine, glutamate, and, to a lesser extent, sucrose act as osmoprotectants.

== Phylogeny ==
Plymouth University microbiologist Rich Boden, using the Tamura–Nei model, has argued on the basis of 16S ribosomal RNA that M. muralis, M. alcalica, and M. lonarensis form a clade to the exclusion of other Methylophaga species including type species of the genus, M. marina. In 2013, INRS microbiologist Richard Villemur and colleagues added their newly described species M. nitratireducenticrescens and M. frappieri to this clade based on 16S rRNA analysis as well. All of the species in this clade are alkaliphilic.
