= Cycloclasticus pugetii =

Scientific classification
- Domain: Bacteria
- Kingdom: Pseudomonadati
- Phylum: Pseudomonadota
- Class: Gammaproteobacteria
- Order: Thiotrichales
- Family: Piscirickettsiaceae
- Genus: Cycloclasticus
- Species: C. pugetii

Binomial name
- Cycloclasticus pugetii Dyksterhouse et al. 1995

Species of bacterium

Cycloclasticus pugetii is a species of bacterium found in marine sediments. It is notable for being able to break down aromatic hydrocarbon, including naphthalene, phenanthrene, anthracene and toluene. It is an aerobic, gram-negative, rod-shaped bacterium from the family Piscirickettsiaceae, and it is motile by means of single polar flagellum. Strain PS-1 is its type strain. It was named in honor of Peter Puget.
