= Siberica =

Siberica may refer to:

== Species ==
- Scilla siberica, species of flowering plant
- Thiomicrospira sibirica, species of bacteria

== Other uses ==
- Natura Siberica, Russian organic cosmetics company
