= Thiomicrospira aerophila =

Scientific classification
- Domain: Bacteria
- Kingdom: Pseudomonadati
- Phylum: Pseudomonadota
- Class: Gammaproteobacteria
- Order: Thiotrichales
- Family: Piscirickettsiaceae
- Genus: Thiomicrospira
- Species: T. aerophila

Binomial name
- Thiomicrospira aerophila (Sorokin et al. 2001) Boden et al. 2017

Species of bacterium

Thiomicrospira aerophila (basonynm: Thioalkalimicrobium aerophilum) is an obligately alkaliphilic and obligately chemolithoautotrophic sulfur-oxidizing bacterium that was previously the type species of Thioalkalimicrobium prior to reclassification in 2017. It was first isolated from soda lakes in northern Russia.
