= Methylophaga thalassica =

Scientific classification
- Domain: Bacteria
- Kingdom: Pseudomonadati
- Phylum: Pseudomonadota
- Class: Gammaproteobacteria
- Order: Thiotrichales
- Family: Piscirickettsiaceae
- Genus: Methylophaga
- Species: M. thalassica

Binomial name
- Methylophaga thalassica Janvier et al. 1985

Species of bacterium

Methylophaga thalassica is an obligately methylotrophic, Gram-negative, strictly aerobic, motile, rod-shaped bacteria. Its type strain is ATCC 33146 (= NCMB 2163).
