= Francisella orientalis =

Scientific classification
- Domain: Bacteria
- Kingdom: Pseudomonadati
- Phylum: Pseudomonadota
- Class: Gammaproteobacteria
- Order: Thiotrichales
- Family: Francisellaceae
- Genus: Francisella
- Species: F. orientalis

Binomial name
- Francisella orientalis (Ottem et al. 2009) Ramirez-Paredes et al 2020

Synonyms
- Francisella orientalis subsp. orientalis

Species of bacterium

Francisella orientalis is a species of gram-negative, rod-shaped bacterium from the family Francisellaceae. It is a pathogen of fish and is particularly associated with francisellosis in Nile tilapia (Oreochromic niloticus). The species has been reported from freshwater and marine fish in several regions of the world.

== Taxonomy ==
The organism was initially described in 2009 as Francisella noatuensis subsp. orientalis, a subspecies of Francisella noatunesis. Its type strain, Ehime-1, had been isolated from three-line grunt (Parapristipoma trilineatum) in Ehime Prefecture, Japan. The specific name "orientalis" means "from the east", referring to the location where the type strain was isolated.

A 2020 taxonomic study re-examined fish-pathogenic Francisella using whole-genome sequencing, DNA-DNA hybridization, and metabolic characterization. Isolates then classified as F. noatunensis subsp. orientalis formed a genetically and phenotypically distinct group, leading to the reclassification of the bacterium to the separate species F. orientalis.

== Characteristics ==
Francisella orientalis is a fastidious bacterium and can be difficult to grow using routine bacteriological culture methods. The optimal growth temperature of F. orientalis is approximately 28-29 °C. Colonies on cystine heart agar supplemented with hemoglobin are greenish-grey. The bacterium can use several carbohydrates, including glucose, fructose, and mannose. F. orientalis can assimilate acetic acid, glycerol, and glucose-6-phosphate.

F. orientalis is capable of forming biofilms.

== Francisellosis ==
Francisella orientalis causes piscine francisellosis, particularly in warm-water fish. Infection is systemic and commonly produces granulomas, which appear as small white nodules in organs such as the spleen and kidney.

== Host range ==
Francisella orientalis has broad geographic distribution and has been associated particularly with tilapia aquaculture. Infections in farmed tilapia have been reported from many countries including, Brazil, China, Costa Rica, Indonesia, Taiwan, Thailand, United States, and United Kingdom. Although tilapia are important hosts, the F. orientalis is not restricted to this species. The type strain was isolated from three-line grunt, and other isolates have been recovered from hybrid striped bass and ornamental cichlids.
