= Thiomicrospira =

Scientific classification
- Domain: Bacteria
- Kingdom: Pseudomonadati
- Phylum: Pseudomonadota
- Class: Gammaproteobacteria
- Order: Thiotrichales
- Family: Piscirickettsiaceae
- Genus: Thiomicrospira; Kuenen and Veldkamp 1972 (Approved Lists 1980)

Type species
- Thiomicrospira pelophila Kuenen and Veldkamp 1972 (Approved Lists 1980)

Species
- Thiomicrospira aerophila (Sorokin et al. 2001) Boden et al. 2017; Thiomicrospira cyclica (Sorokin et al. 2002) Boden et al. 2017; Thiomicrospira microaerophila (Sorokin et al. 2007) Boden et al. 2017; Thiomicrospira pelophila Kuenen and Veldkamp 1972 (Approved Lists 1980); Thiomicrospira sibirica (Sorokin et al. 2001) Boden et al. 2017; Thiomicrospira thyasirae corrig. (Wood and Kelly 1995) Wood and Kelly 1995

Synonyms
- Thialkalimicrobium Sorokin et al. 2001; Thioalkalimicrobium corrig. Sorokin et al. 2001

Genus of bacteria

Thiomicrospira is a genus of bacteria in the class Gammaproteobacteria. In 2017, all 4 species of the genus Thioalkalimicrobium were reclassified to Thiomicrospira.
