= Piscirickettsia =

Scientific classification
- Domain: Bacteria
- Kingdom: Pseudomonadati
- Phylum: Pseudomonadota
- Class: Gammaproteobacteria
- Order: Thiotrichales
- Family: Piscirickettsiaceae
- Genus: Piscirickettsia; Fryer et al. 1992

Species
- Piscirickettsia salmonis

Genus of bacteria

Piscirickettsia is a genus of bacteria in the order Thiotrichales. As of 2026, it is a monotypic genus with Piscirickettsia salmonis being the only accepted species. A draft genome for a second species with the suggested name Piscirickettsia litoralis was published in 2016 but could not progress to become an accepted species.
