= Piscirickettsia salmonis =

Scientific classification
- Domain: Bacteria
- Kingdom: Pseudomonadati
- Phylum: Pseudomonadota
- Class: Gammaproteobacteria
- Order: Thiotrichales
- Family: Piscirickettsiaceae
- Genus: Piscirickettsia
- Species: P. salmonis

Binomial name
- Piscirickettsia salmonis Fryer et al. 1992

Species of bacterium

Piscirickettsia salmonis is the bacterial causative agent of piscirickettsiosis, an epizootic disease in salmonid fishes. It has a major impact on salmon populations, with a mortality rate of up to 90% in some species. The type strain, LF-89, is from Chile, but multiple strains exist, and some are more virulent than others. P. salmonis and piscrickettsiosis are present in various geographic regions from Europe to Oceania to South America, but the Chilean salmon farming industry has been particularly hard-hit. Different strategies of controlling the disease and farm-to-farm spread have been the subject of much research, but a significant amount is still unknown.

== History ==
The disease caused by Piscirickettsia salmonis, piscirickettsiosis, was first identified in Chile in 1989 as coho salmon syndrome, although observations of the illness date to at least 1981. P. salmonis was first described in 1992, when it was identified as the causative agent of the disease and classified as a member of the family Rickettsiaceae before it was reclassified as a member of family Piscirickettsiaceae in 2003.

When piscirickettsiosis was first reported in 1989, it was one of the greatest threats to salmon aquaculture in Chile, with some infection coho salmon populations experiencing mortality rates of 90%. Economic loss in 1989 due to the disease was US$10 million; by 1995, the loss was US$49 million. Impacts decreased in the early 2000s due to improved management practices and a shift in farmed populations from highly vulnerable coho salmon to more resistant Atlantic salmon, although the disease was still considered to be one of the largest problems facing the Chilean salmon farming industry. In 2007, the infectious salmon anemia crisis devastated the industry and other infectious diseases became relatively less important, but piscirickettsiosis had re-emerged as one of the primary challenges for salmon aquaculture by 2014. It continues to present challenges today, and infected farms typically lose 30-35% of their stock, although that number can be as high as 90%.

Much is still unknown about P. salmonis and piscirickettsiosis. Due to these research gaps, in 2018 an advisory committee identified a list of 52 research questions about the disease and the bacterium that causes it to be addressed moving forward.

== Piscirickettsia salmonis ==
Piscirickettsia salmonis is a gram-negative, non-motile bacterium. It is generally coccoid, with a diameter of 0.5-1.5 μm. It is most often found in pairs or ring-shaped groups. Although it has an external membrane as well as an internal cytoplasmic membrane, it is not encapsulated. When stressed, P. salmonis sometimes produces cell aggregates that resemble biofilm structures. The bacterium replicates via binary fission in membrane-bound cytoplasmic vacuoles. Like many bacteria, P. salmonis susceptible to infection by phages.

Although it was initially described as obligately intracellular, more recent research has established that P. salmonis can survive as both a free-living bacterium in the marine environment and in laboratory settings on cysteine-enriched agar media and blood-free agar media. In seawater, free-living P. salmonis can survive for at least 21 days under the right environmental conditions, and is capable of forming viable and mucus-tolerant biofilms on nonliving surfaces including glass, plastic, and mollusk shells. Survival is highest at around 5 °C, and decreases as temperature increases; almost no survival is observed above 25 °C. P. salmonis does not appear to be able to survive without a host in freshwater environments.

The type strain, LF-89, is from Chile, but isolates have been identified from multiple other localities including Norway, Canada, Scotland, and Ireland. In Tasmania, the strain EM-90 was confirmed as the cause of a major salmon mortality event in early 2025, according to the Tasmanian Chief Veterinary Officer. The type strain EM-90 is endemic to Chile.

All isolates of P. salmonis are closely related, but some strains, such as LF-89, are more virulent than others. Although they belong to different classes, Piscirickettsia (Gammaproteobacteria) is morphologically similar to true Rickettsia bacteria (Alphaproteobacteria), for which it was named. P. salmonis has been found in ballast water even when ships completed a ballast water exchange between ports, which might explain geographic dispersion.

Piscirickettsia salmonis should not be confused with Neorickettsia helminthoeca, the causative agent of salmon poisoning disease in canids. Salmonid fishes are hosts for the trematode vector of N. helminthoeca, Nanophyetus salmincola, but are not themselves infected by N. helminthoeca.

== Piscirickettsiosis ==
=== Transmission ===
Piscirickettsia salmonis infects a variety of salmonid hosts, including Chinook salmon (Oncorhynchus tshawytscha), coho salmon (Oncorhynchus kisutch), Atlantic salmon (Salmo salar), pink salmon (Oncorhynchus gorbuscha), masu salmon (Oncorhynchus masou), and rainbow trout (Oncorhynchus mykiss). It has also been found in several non-salmonid hosts such as the white seabass (Atractoscion nobilis), Patagonian blenny (Eleginops maclovinus), Cape redfish (Sebastes capensis), tadpole codling (Salilota australis), and European seabass (Dicentrarchus labrax).

Piscirickettsia salmonis initially infects hosts orally or by breaching the skin or gills, especially when the host is already injured. Transmission may also occur when infected prey are consumed. Under natural conditions, the incubation period is around 2 weeks. Both horizontal and vertical transmission of P. salmonis has been demonstrated, but horizontal transmission seems to be the most important means by which the bacteria spreads. The parasitic isopod Ceratothoa gaudichaudii is a host for P. salmonis and may represent an important vector of infection in Chilean salmon farms, but horizontal transmission regularly occurs in the absence of a vector. Both conspecifics and heterospecifics may horizontally transmit the bacterium to an individual of a given species. Infection rates are highest during the outgrowing phase of the farmed salmon life cycle, when salmon are kept in seawater and during the fall and spring. Risk factors for farm-wide outbreaks of piscirickettsiosis include increased temperatures, longer time spent in seawater during the outgrowing phase, and the presence of outbreaks at neighboring farms.

=== Effects ===
Piscirickettsiosis, the disease caused by P. salmonis, is also known as salmon rickettsia syndrome and salmonid rickettsial septicaemia.

After initial transmission, P. salmonis is capable of infecting macrophages without inducing apoptosis, which allows it to spread throughout a host's body while evading the host's natural immune response. P. salmonis infections appear to be systematic. White or yellow lesions or ulcers, ranging from 1mm to 2 cm in diameter, are often present in the liver, kidneys, spleen, intestine, and skeletal muscle. Pathological changes have been reported in organs as diverse as the brain, heart, ovaries, and gills. Necrosis in the kidneys causes anemia. Although many fish do not display outward signs of illness even when the disease has progressed to the point of mortality, several indications of infection may be noted. These include external symptoms such as lesions, ulcers, and darkening of the skin; abdominal swelling; and pale gills as a result of anemia. Behavioral symptoms such as lethargy, loss of appetite, respiratory distress, and surface swimming have also been observed. The bacterial load in the brain of infected fish can be up to 100 times higher than the bacterial loads in the liver and kidneys, which may explain certain behavioral changes.

Piscirickettsiosis is diagnosed based on external and internal symptoms in combination with the detection of P. salmonis. Smears of the kidney, liver, and spleen can be stained with Gram, Giemsa, acridine orange, or methylene blue stain for direct observation of the bacteria within host cells, but following this initial detection, the identity of the bacteria must be confirmed with serological or molecular testing. Because the ITS region of the rRNA operon is more variable than the 16S region, PCR testing usually targets the ITS region to allow for finer-scale identification of different P. salmonis strains.

=== Controlling piscirickettsiosis ===
There is little field information about the efficacy of commercial vaccines and antibiotics against P. salmonis and piscirickettsiosis, even though historically, these methods have been at the center of attempts to control piscirickettsiosis outbreaks. The anadromous life history of salmonids and the high population densities of farmed salmon make it difficult to effectively control piscirickettsiosis outbreaks, although early detection is crucial for successful management.

==== Vaccines ====
Vaccinated fish have lower mortality than unvaccinated fish through the winter of the year of vaccine administration, but lose their immunity with the arrival of spring. Injectable vaccines administered in freshwater are effective at preventing the piscirickettsiosis outbreak that often occurs when salmon are transferred from freshwater to seawater for the ongrowing stage, but render fish vulnerable to more aggressive outbreaks later on. Injectable revaccination is not considered cost-effective, but oral booster vaccines are sometimes delivered through food. As of 2020, 32 different vaccines against piscirickettsiosis are commercially available in Chile, but efficacy varies and there is no easy way for farming businesses to compare data on different vaccines.

==== Antibiotics ====
Antibiotics are not reliably effective against piscirickettsiosis outbreaks due to both antibiotic resistance and the intracellular lifestyle of the bacterium within the host. Despite this, the Chilean salmon farming industry has one of the highest rates internationally of antibiotic consumption per ton of harvested fish. Florfenicol and oxytetracycline are the antibiotics most frequently used to target P. salmonis outbreaks even though the bacteria has demonstrated signs of resistance to both antibiotics. The environmental implications of antibiotic use in salmon aquaculture are poorly understood, and consequences may be far-reaching. The use of florfenicol and oxytratracycline to treat piscirickettsiosis is still sometimes successful, especially if treatment is administered early in an outbreak when mortality is still low. Recently, researchers demonstrated that bimonthly risk-based qPCR sampling of five moribund or dead fish from 2-3 netpens would successfully and cost-effectively detect early infections of piscirickettsiosis up to 95% of the time, which could help farmers successfully administer antibiotics while mortality is still low enough for them to be effective.

==== Feed additives ====
Commercial phytogenic feed additives (PTAs) such as labdane diterpenes derived from Andrographis sp. may provide a biodegradable, easy-to-administer alternative to vaccines and antibiotics, as they have been demonstrated to reduce the virulence of piscirickettsiosis outbreaks.

==== Indirect interventions ====
Indirect interventions may help reduce community transmission and prevent outbreaks. These interventions include reducing the density at which salmon are farmed, establishing fallowing periods for farms affected by piscirickettsiosis, and disinfecting equipment between production cycles. Since 2009, the Chilean salmon farming industry has adopted practices such as mandatory fallowing and equipment disinfection and it has been prohibited to transfer fish between different farms; these strategies have reduced the likelihood of farm-to-farm transmission, but the disease is still prevalent. Salmon farming companies are also required to submit information about infectious diseases to the Chilean government to maintain their licenses. The length of the fallowing period and the disinfectants used on equipment may be important. Fallowing for at least three months can help lower the abundance of P. salmonis between production cycles, although it does not eliminate the bacteria completely. Peracetic acid, peroxides, and active and inactive chlorine dioxides are the most effective sanitizers at reducing P. salmonis prevalence.

==== Selective breeding ====
Resistance against piscirickettsiosis is weakly heritable in Atlantic and coho salmon and moderately heritable in rainbow trout. Resistance is also strongly correlated with a lower harvest weight in coho salmon, suggesting a negative relationship between resistance and growth. It may be possible to selectively breed piscirickettsiosis-resistant strains of salmon for farming.
