= Methylophaga =

Scientific classification
- Domain: Bacteria
- Kingdom: Pseudomonadati
- Phylum: Pseudomonadota
- Class: Gammaproteobacteria
- Order: Thiotrichales
- Family: Piscirickettsiaceae
- Genus: Methylophaga; Janvier et al. 1985

Type species
- Methylophaga marina Janvier et al. 1985

Species
- M. alcalica M. aminisulfidivorans M. frappieri M. lonarensis M. marina M. muralis M. nitratireducenticrescens M. sulfidovorans M. thalassica M. thiooxydans

Genus of bacteria

The genus Methylophaga consists of halophilic methylotrophic members of the Gammaproteobacteria, all of which were isolated from marine or otherwise low water activity environments, such as the surface of marble or hypersaline lakes. The cells are rod-shaped. and are motile by a single polar flagellum. (with the possible exception of M. aminisulfidivorans which has been described as being non-motile)

When Methylophaga was defined originally as a genus in 1985, all species known at that time were auxotrophic for vitamin B12, however, many species were found to be non-auxotrophic and so this is no longer a defining characteristic. Methylophaga spp. are the dominant methylotrophs in the upper layers of the oceans, and have key roles in the biogeochemical cycling of methanol, monomethylamine, dimethylsulfide and methyl bromide.

All known species are methylotrophic and grow on methanol and usually other one-carbon compounds as well as fructose, Methylophaga thiooxydans has been shown to grow on substituted thiophenes. Chemolithoheterotrophy has been observed in both Methylophaga thiooxydans and Methylophaga sulfidovorans, at the expense of thiosulfate and sulfide, respectively and may be a wider property in the genus as a whole.
