= Francisella philomiragia =

Scientific classification
- Domain: Bacteria
- Kingdom: Pseudomonadati
- Phylum: Pseudomonadota
- Class: Gammaproteobacteria
- Order: Thiotrichales
- Family: Francisellaceae
- Genus: Francisella
- Species: F. philomiragia

Binomial name
- Francisella philomiragia (Jensen et al. 1969) Hollis et al. 1990

Synonyms
- Yersinia philomiragia Jensen et al. 1969

Species of bacterium

Francisella philomiragia is a species of gram-negative bacteria from the family Francisellaceae. The species was previously called Yersinia philomiragia. F. philomiragia is known to cause infections in humans.
