= Edward Francis =

Edward Francis may refer to:

- Edward Francis (bacteriologist) (1872–1957), bacteriologist involved in the discovery of Francisella
- Edward Carey Francis (1897–1966), mathematician and Kenyan educator
- Edward Howel Francis (1924–2014), geologist
- Edward Francis (priest) (1929–2004), Archdeacon of Bromley
- Edward Francis (bishop) (1930–2017), Bishop of Sivagangai 1987–2005
- Edward Francis (footballer) (born 1999), English footballer

== See also ==
- Ed Francis (1926–2016), wrestler
- Eddie Francis (born 1974), Canadian politician
- Edward Fraunceys (ca. 1566 – 1626), English MP for Steyning
- Francis (surname)
