= Methylophaga marina =

Scientific classification
- Domain: Bacteria
- Kingdom: Pseudomonadati
- Phylum: Pseudomonadota
- Class: Gammaproteobacteria
- Order: Thiotrichales
- Family: Piscirickettsiaceae
- Genus: Methylophaga
- Species: M. marina

Binomial name
- Methylophaga marina Janvier et al. 1985

Species of bacterium

Methylophaga marina is an obligately methylotrophic, Gram-negative, strictly aerobic, motile, rod-shaped bacteria, the type species of its genus. Its type strain is ATCC 35842 (= NCMB 2244).

M. marina is catalase and oxidase positive.
