= Francisella piscicida =

Scientific classification
- Domain: Bacteria
- Kingdom: Pseudomonadati
- Phylum: Pseudomonadota
- Class: Gammaproteobacteria
- Order: Thiotrichales
- Family: Francisellaceae
- Genus: Francisella
- Species: F. piscicida

Binomial name
- Francisella piscicida Ottem, Nylund, Karlsbakk, Friis-Møller, Krossøy & Knappskog, 2008

Species of bacterium

Francisella piscicida is a Gram-negative bacterium present in Atlantic cod. It is the causative agent of francisellosis, a serious disease present in Norwegian cod farming.

Diagnosis of F. piscicida infection in fish is typically made through culture methods; however, alternative diagnostic assays have been developed that can be used directly on fish specimens.
