= Thiomicrospira sibirica =

Scientific classification
- Domain: Bacteria
- Kingdom: Pseudomonadati
- Phylum: Pseudomonadota
- Class: Gammaproteobacteria
- Order: Thiotrichales
- Family: Piscirickettsiaceae
- Genus: Thiomicrospira
- Species: T. sibirica

Binomial name
- Thiomicrospira sibirica (Sorokin et al. 2001) Boden et al. 2017

Synonyms
- Thioalkalimicrobium sibiricum corrig. Sorokin et al. 2001; Thioalkalimicrobium sibericum Sorokin et al. 2001; Thialkalimicrobium sibiricum Sorokin et al. 2001

Species of bacterium

Thiomicrospira sibirica is a species of obligately alkaliphilic and obligately chemolithoautotrophic sulfur-oxidizing bacteria. It was first isolated from soda lakes in northern Russia, hence the specific epithet. In 2017, all 4 species of the genus Thioalkalimicrobium were reclassified to Thiomicrospira.
