= Methylophaga sulfidovorans =

Scientific classification
- Domain: Bacteria
- Kingdom: Pseudomonadati
- Phylum: Pseudomonadota
- Class: Gammaproteobacteria
- Order: Thiotrichales
- Family: Piscirickettsiaceae
- Genus: Methylophaga
- Species: M. sulfidovorans

Binomial name
- Methylophaga sulfidovorans de Zwart et al. 1998

Species of bacterium

Methylophaga sulfidovorans is an obligately methylotrophic, aerobic, dimethylsulfide-oxidizing bacterium. It is Gram-negative, oval, with strain RB-1.
