= Cycloclasticus =

Scientific classification
- Domain: Bacteria
- Kingdom: Pseudomonadati
- Phylum: Pseudomonadota
- Class: Gammaproteobacteria
- Order: Thiotrichales
- Family: Piscirickettsiaceae
- Genus: Cycloclasticus; Dyksterhouse et al. 1995

Type species
- C. pugetii

Species
- Cycloclasticus oligotrophus; Cycloclasticus pugetii; Cycloclasticus spirillensus

Genus of bacteria

Cycloclasticus is a genus in the phylum Pseudomonadota (Bacteria).

== Etymology ==
The name Cycloclasticus derives from:
Greek noun kuklos, circle or ring; Neo-Latin adjective clasticus -a -um (from Greek adjective klastos -ē -on, broken in pieces), breaking; Neo-Latin masculine gender noun cycloclasticus, ring-breaker.

== Species ==
The genus contains a single species, namely C. pugetii ( Dyksterhouse et al. 1995, (Type species of the genus).; Neo-Latin genitive case masculine gender noun pugetii, of Puget, named in honor of Peter Puget, a British naval officer who participated in the Vancouver Expedition and for whom Puget Sound was named.) Other candidate species, e.g., "C. spirillensus," have not been formally recognized. "C. spirillenus" is notable for its spirillum morphology.

== See also ==
- Bacterial taxonomy
- Microbiology
