= Edward Francis (bacteriologist) =

American physician (1872–1957)

- Francis in 1943
- Born: March 27, 1872; Shandon, Ohio, U.S.
- Died: April 14, 1957 (aged 85)
- Education: B.S., Ohio State University; M.D., University of Cincinnati
- Known for: Research on tularemia
- Awards: Gold Medal of the American Medical Association (1928)
- Scientific career
- Fields: Microbiology

Edward Francis (March 27, 1872 – April 14, 1957) was an American physician, bacteriologist, and public health researcher. He is best known for his research on tularemia, including work establishing the relationship between the deer fly vector and the bacterium that causes the disease. The genus Francisella was later named in recognition of his contributions to the study of the disease.

== Early life and education ==
Edward Francis was born on March 27, 1872, in Shandon, Ohio. He attended Ohio State University, graduating in 1894. Francis later studied medicine at the University of Cincinnati, receiving his medical degree in 1897.

== Career ==
In 1900, Francis joined the Marine Hospital Service, the direct predecessor to the United States Public Health Service. During his career with the Public Health Service, he investigated several infectious diseases, including yellow fever, pellagra, tetanus, filariasis, undulant fever, and tularemia.

=== Tularemia research ===
Francis became particularly associated with the investigation of tularemia during the early 20th century. In 1911, scientists in California discovered a bacterium that caused a plague-like disease in ground squirrels in Tulare County, California. They named the organism Bacterium tularense after the county.

One of Francis’s first tasks as a public health scientist was to investigate "deer-fly fever", a disease occurring in Utah. During his first field investigation there, Francis himself contracted the disease. Unaware of the cause of his illness, Francis traveled back to Washington, stopping in Chicago to inoculate the organism into fresh animals. By the time he reached Washington he became seriously ill and was hospitalized. Francis did not recognize that his illness was the disease he was investigating until a year later.

His subsequent research established that the Utah disease was caused by B. tularense, linking it to the previously described infection of California ground squirrels. He proposed the name tularemia for the disease, deriving it from the name of the bacterium. In a 1921 publication, Francis described tularemia as a specific infectious disease caused by B. tularense and recognized transmission to humans through blood feeding insects and through contact with infected rodents.

Francis also developed an agglutination test that became important in the diagnosis of tularemia. According to a later historical account by William L. Jellison, only 14 human infections with F. tularensis had been reported when Francis began his research. Approximately 800 cases were diagnosed during the following four years, many of which Francis personally confirmed by isolation of the bacterium or by agglutination testing. By 1944, he had compiled information on approximately 14,000 cases in the United States.

Francis also investigated tularemia in animals intended for human consumption. In 1923, he examined rabbits being sold at a market in Washington, D.C., and identified seven infected animals. His investigation also documented serological evidence of previous infection in the market worker who worked at the stand from which the rabbits were sourced.

== Awards and honors ==
In 1928, he was awarded with the gold medal of the American Medical Association in recognition of his contributions to the understanding of tularemia. He also received honorary Doctor of Science degrees from Miami University (1929) and Ohio State University (1933).
