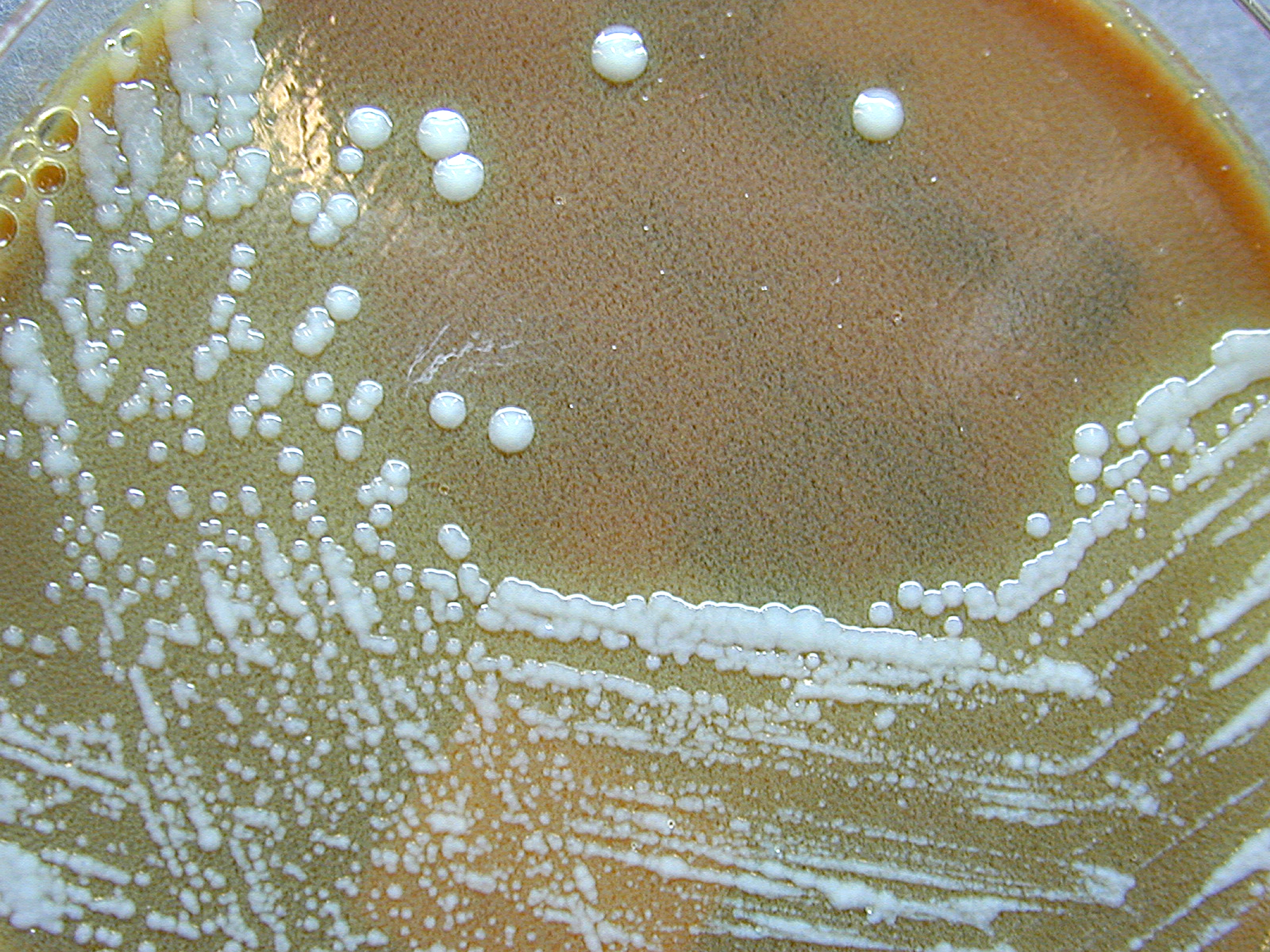

Scientific classification
- Domain: Bacteria
- Kingdom: Pseudomonadati
- Phylum: Pseudomonadota
- Class: Gammaproteobacteria
- Order: Thiotrichales
- Family: Francisellaceae; Sjöstedt 2005
- Genus: Francisella; Dorofe'ev 1947

Species
- F. tularensis F. novicida F. hispaniensis F. opportunistica F. orientalis F. persica F. noatunensis F. philomiragia F. halioticida F. endociliophora F. guangzhouensis F. piscicida

= Francisella =

Genus of bacteria

Francisella is a genus of Gram-negative bacteria. They are small coccobacillary or rod-shaped, nonmotile organisms, which are also facultative intracellular parasites of macrophages. Strict aerobes, Francisella colonies bear a morphological resemblance to those of the genus Brucella. Some Francisella species are pathogenic bacteria but some others are endosymbionts of ticks. Ticks do not use any other food source than vertebrate blood and therefore ingest high levels of protein, iron and salt, but few vitamins. To overcome these nutritional deficiencies, ticks have evolved obligate interactions with nutritional endosymbionts, including Francisella endosymbionts. Their experimental elimination typically results in decreased tick survival, molting, fecundity and egg viability, as well as in physical abnormalities, which all are fully restored with an oral supplement of B vitamins. The genome sequencing of Francisella endosymbionts confirmed that they consistently produce three B vitamin types, biotin (vitamin B_{7}), riboflavin (B_{2}) and folate (B_{9}). Francisella endosymbionts are often misidentified as Francisella tularensis; however, Francisella endosymbionts lack virulence genes and cannot infect humans.

The genus was named in honor of American bacteriologist Edward Francis, who, in 1922, first recognized F. tularensis (then named Bacterium tularensis) as the causative agent of tularemia.

== Pathogenesis ==
The type species, F. tularensis, causes the disease tularemia or rabbit fever. F. novicida and F. philomiragia (previously Yersinia philomiragia) are associated with sepsis and invasive systemic infections.

Francisella has been detected in ticks

== Taxonomy ==
The taxonomy of the genus is somewhat uncertain, especially in the case of F. novicida (which be a subspecies of F. tularensis). In general, identification of species is accomplished by biochemical profiling or 16S rRNA sequencing. An updated phylogeny based on whole genome sequencing has recently been published showing the genus Francisella could be divided into two main genetic clades: one including F. tularensis, F. novicida and F. hispaniensis, and another including F. philomiragia and F. noatunensis.

== Laboratory characteristics ==
Francisella species can survive for several weeks in the environment; paradoxically, they can be difficult to culture and maintain in the laboratory. Growth is slow (though increased by CO_{2} supplementation) and the organisms are fastidious, with most Francisella strains requiring cystine and cysteine media supplementation for growth. Growth has been successful on several media types, including chocolate agar and Thayer–Martin medium with appropriate additives as noted above. Attempted isolation on MacConkey agar is not reliable or generally successful.

After 24 hours of incubation on appropriate solid media, Francisella colonies are generally small (1 to 2 mm), opaque, and white-gray to bluish-gray in color. Colonies are smooth, with clean edges and, after a 48 hours of growth, tend to have a shiny surface.
