= Francisella small RNAs =

Several small RNAs in Francisella tularensis, a pathogenic bacterium

Several small RNAs have been identified in Francisella tularensis, pathogenic bacterium that causes the disease tularaemia. Very little is known about Francisella's regulatory networks that allow this bacterium to survive in many environments.

Ftr A and Ftr B (Francisella tularensis sRNA A and B) were the first sRNAs identified in F. tularensis, more specifically in F. t. holarctica. Experimental analysis confirmed the expression of the well known non-coding RNAs: tmRNA and 4.5S RNA as well as identification of the 2 new sRNAs Ftr A and Ftr B. A genome-wide in silico search found several other sRNAs. Ftr A and Ftr B share no sequence similarity or conserved genomic context with any previously annotated regulatory RNAs. Deletion of Ftr A and Ftr B led to significant changes in the expression of several mRNAs. However, it did not alter Francisella's survival during normal growth or under stress conditions. Also deletion of those sRNAs did not affect bacterium ability to induce disease in a mouse model. A major study in F. t. novicida later demonstrated FtrA to be associated with a CRISPR/Cas system and to repress an endogenous transcript encoding a bacterial lipoprotein.

FtrC (Francisella tularensis sRNA C) is the first sRNA shown to modulate the virulence capacity of F. tularensis. High expression of FtrC reduces intracellular multiplication of the bacteria in macrophages and in organs of infected mice. FtrC mRNA target gene was also identified, but it is not involved in Francisella multiplication.
