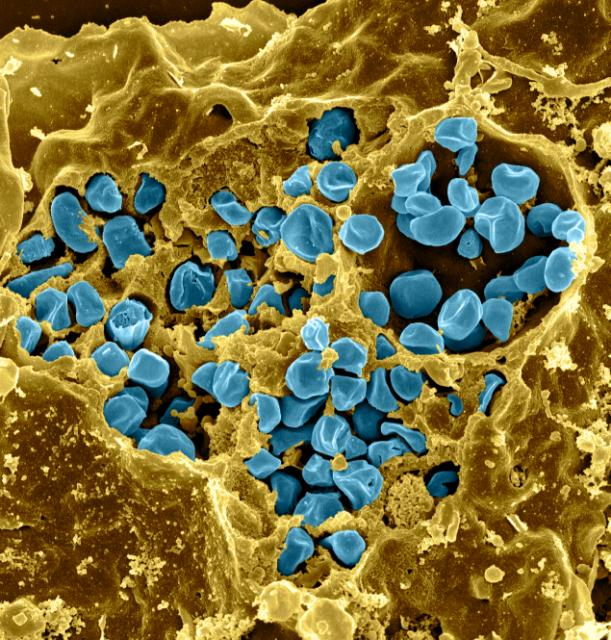
- Francisella tularensis bacteria (blue) infecting a macrophage (yellow)

Scientific classification
- Domain: Bacteria
- Kingdom: Pseudomonadati
- Phylum: Pseudomonadota
- Class: Gammaproteobacteria
- Order: Thiotrichales
- Family: Francisellaceae
- Genus: Francisella
- Species: F. tularensis

Binomial name
- Francisella tularensis (McCoy and Chapin 1912); Dorofe'ev 1947

= Francisella tularensis =

Species of bacterium

Francisella tularensis is a pathogenic species of Gram-negative coccobacillus, an aerobic bacterium. It is nonspore-forming, nonmotile, and the causative agent of tularemia, the pneumonic form of which is often lethal without treatment. It is a fastidious, facultative intracellular bacterium, which requires cysteine for growth. Due to its low infectious dose, ease of spread by aerosol, and high virulence, F. tularensis is classified as a Tier 1 Select Agent by the U.S. government, along with other potential agents of bioterrorism such as Yersinia pestis, Bacillus anthracis, and Ebola virus. When found in nature, Francisella tularensis can survive for several weeks at low temperatures in animal carcasses, soil, and water. In the laboratory, F. tularensis appears as small rods (0.2 by 0.2 μm), and is grown best at 35–37 °C.

== History ==
This species was discovered in ground squirrels in Tulare County, California in 1911. Bacterium tularense was soon isolated by George Walter McCoy (1876–1952) of the US Plague Lab in San Francisco and reported in 1912. In 1922, Edward Francis (1872–1957), a physician and medical researcher from Ohio, discovered that Bacterium tularense was the causative agent of tularemia, after studying several cases with symptoms of the disease. Later, it became known as Francisella tularensis, in honor of the discovery by Francis.

The disease was also described in the Fukushima region of Japan by Hachiro Ohara in the 1920s, where it was associated with hunting rabbits. In 1938, Soviet bacteriologist Vladimir Dorofeev (1911–1988) and his team recreated the infectious cycle of the pathogen in humans, and his team was the first to create protection measures. In 1947, Dorofeev independently isolated the pathogen that Francis discovered in 1922. Hence it is commonly known as Francisella dorofeev in former Soviet countries.

== Classification ==
Three subspecies (biovars) of F. tularensis are recognised (as of 2020):

1. F. t. tularensis (or type A), found predominantly in North America, is the most virulent of the four known subspecies, and is associated with lethal pulmonary infections. This includes the primary type A laboratory strain, SCHUS4.
2. F. t. holarctica (also known as biovar F. t. palearctica or type B) is found predominantly in Europe and Asia, but rarely leads to fatal disease. An attenuated live vaccine strain of subspecies F. t. holarctica has been described, though it is not yet fully licensed by the Food and Drug Administration as a vaccine. This subspecies lacks the citrulline ureidase activity and ability to produce acid from glucose of biovar F. t. palearctica.
3. F. t. mediasiatica, is found primarily in central Asia; little is currently known about this subspecies or its ability to infect humans.

Additionally, F. novicida has sometimes previously been classified as F. t. novicida. It was characterized as a relatively nonvirulent Francisella; only two tularemia cases in North America have been attributed to the organism, and these were only in severely immunocompromised individuals.

== Pathogenesis ==
Human infection is often caused by vectors, particularly ticks but also mosquitos, deer flies and horse-flies. Direct contact with infected animals or carcasses is another source. Important reservoir hosts include lagomorphs (e.g. rabbits), rodents, galliform birds and deer. Infection via fomites (objects) is also important. Human-to-human transmission has been demonstrated via solid organ transplantation.

F. tularensis can survive for weeks outside a mammalian host and has been found in water, grassland, and haystacks. Aerosols containing the bacteria may be generated by disturbing carcasses due to brush cutting or lawn mowing; as a result, tularemia has been referred to as "lawnmower disease". Epidemiological studies have shown a positive correlation between occupations involving the above activities and infection with F. tularensis.

Human infection with F. tularensis can occur by several routes. Portals of entry are through blood and the respiratory system. The most common occurs via skin contact, yielding an ulceroglandular form of the disease. Inhalation of bacteria, particularly biovar F. t. tularensis, leads to the potentially lethal pneumonic tularemia. While the pulmonary and ulceroglandular forms of tularemia are more common, other routes of inoculation have been described and include oropharyngeal infection due to consumption of contaminated food or water, and conjunctival infection due to inoculation at the eye.

=== Lifecycle ===
F. tularensis is a facultative intracellular bacterium that is capable of infecting most cell types, but primarily infects macrophages in the host organism. Entry into the macrophage occurs by phagocytosis and the bacterium is sequestered from the interior of the infected cell by a phagosome. F. tularensis then breaks out of this phagosome into the cytosol and rapidly proliferates. Egress from the cytosol requires the Francisella type VI secretion system (T6SS). The secreted effector PdpC enables rapid escape into the cytosol (within as little as 30 minutes), while OpiA delays phagolysosomal maturation thus impairing host bacterial killing. Eventually, the infected cell undergoes apoptosis, and the progeny bacteria are released in a single "burst" event to initiate new rounds of infection. Alternatively, uninfected phagocytes can become infected via a process termed merocytophagy, in which an uninfected cell "bites off" part of an infected cell.

=== Virulence factors ===
A tularemia lesion on the dorsal skin of a hand

The virulence mechanisms for F. tularensis have not been well characterized. Like other intracellular bacteria that break out of phagosomal compartments to replicate in the cytosol, F. tularensis strains produce different hemolytic agents, which may facilitate degradation of the phagosome. A hemolysin activity, named NlyA, with immunological reactivity to Escherichia coli anti-HlyA antibody, was identified in biovar F. t. novicida. Acid phosphatase AcpA has been found in other bacteria to act as a hemolysin, whereas in Francisella, its role as a virulence factor is under vigorous debate.

F. tularensis contains type VI secretion system (T6SS), also present in some other pathogenic bacteria. It also contains a number of ATP-binding cassette (ABC) proteins that may be linked to the secretion of virulence factors. F. tularensis uses type IV pili to bind to the exterior of a host cell and thus become phagocytosed. Mutant strains lacking pili show severely attenuated pathogenicity.

The expression of a 23-kD protein known as IglC is required for F. tularensis phagosomal breakout and intracellular replication; in its absence, mutant F. tularensis cells die and are degraded by the macrophage. This protein is located in a putative pathogenicity island regulated by the transcription factor MglA.

F. tularensis, in vitro, downregulates the immune response of infected cells, a tactic used by a significant number of pathogenic organisms to ensure their replication is (albeit briefly) unhindered by the host immune system by blocking the warning signals from the infected cells. This downmodulation of the immune response requires the IglC protein, though again the contributions of IglC and other genes are unclear. Several other putative virulence genes exist, but have yet to be characterized for function in F. tularensis pathogenicity.

Unlike most Gram-negative bacteria with 6 fatty acyl tails, the lipopolysaccharide (LPS) of F. tularensis contains only 4 atypically long acyl chains. This abnormal LPS is poorly recognized by the host, and fails to trigger the robust immune response that most LPS triggers.

== Genetics ==
Like many other bacteria, F. tularensis undergoes asexual replication. Bacteria divide into two daughter cells, each of which contains identical genetic information. Genetic variation may be introduced by mutation or horizontal gene transfer.

The genome of F. t. tularensis strain SCHU4 has been sequenced. The studies resulting from the sequencing suggest a number of gene-coding regions in the F. tularensis genome are disrupted by mutations, thus creating blocks in a number of metabolic and synthetic pathways required for survival. This indicates F. tularensis has evolved to depend on the host organism for certain nutrients and other processes ordinarily taken care of by these disrupted genes.

The F. tularensis genome contains unusual transposon-like elements resembling counterparts that normally are found in eukaryotic organisms.

== Phylogenetics ==
Much of the known global genetic diversity of F. t. holarctica is present in Sweden. This suggests this subspecies originated in Scandinavia and spread from there to the rest of Eurosiberia.

== Use as a biological weapon ==
When the U.S. biological warfare program ended in 1969, F. tularensis was one of seven standardized biological weapons it had developed as part of German-American cooperation in the 1920s–1930s.

== Diagnosis, treatment, and prevention ==
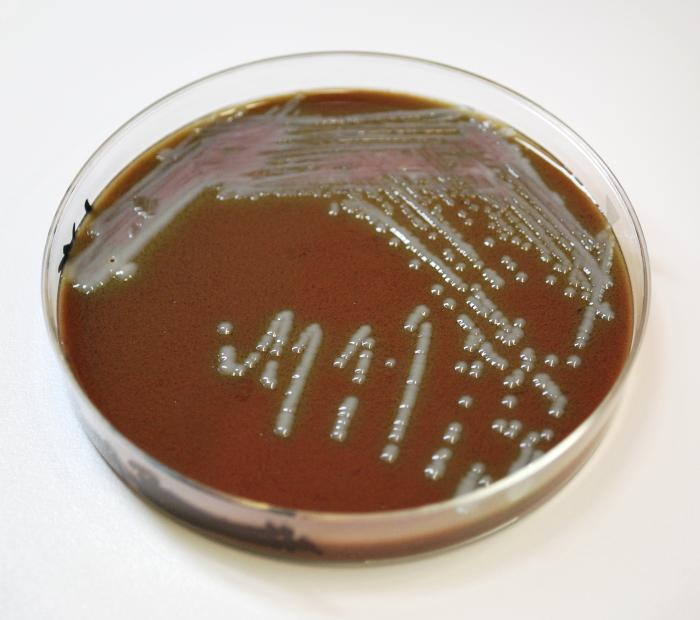
Chocolate agar plate showing colonies of F. tularensis

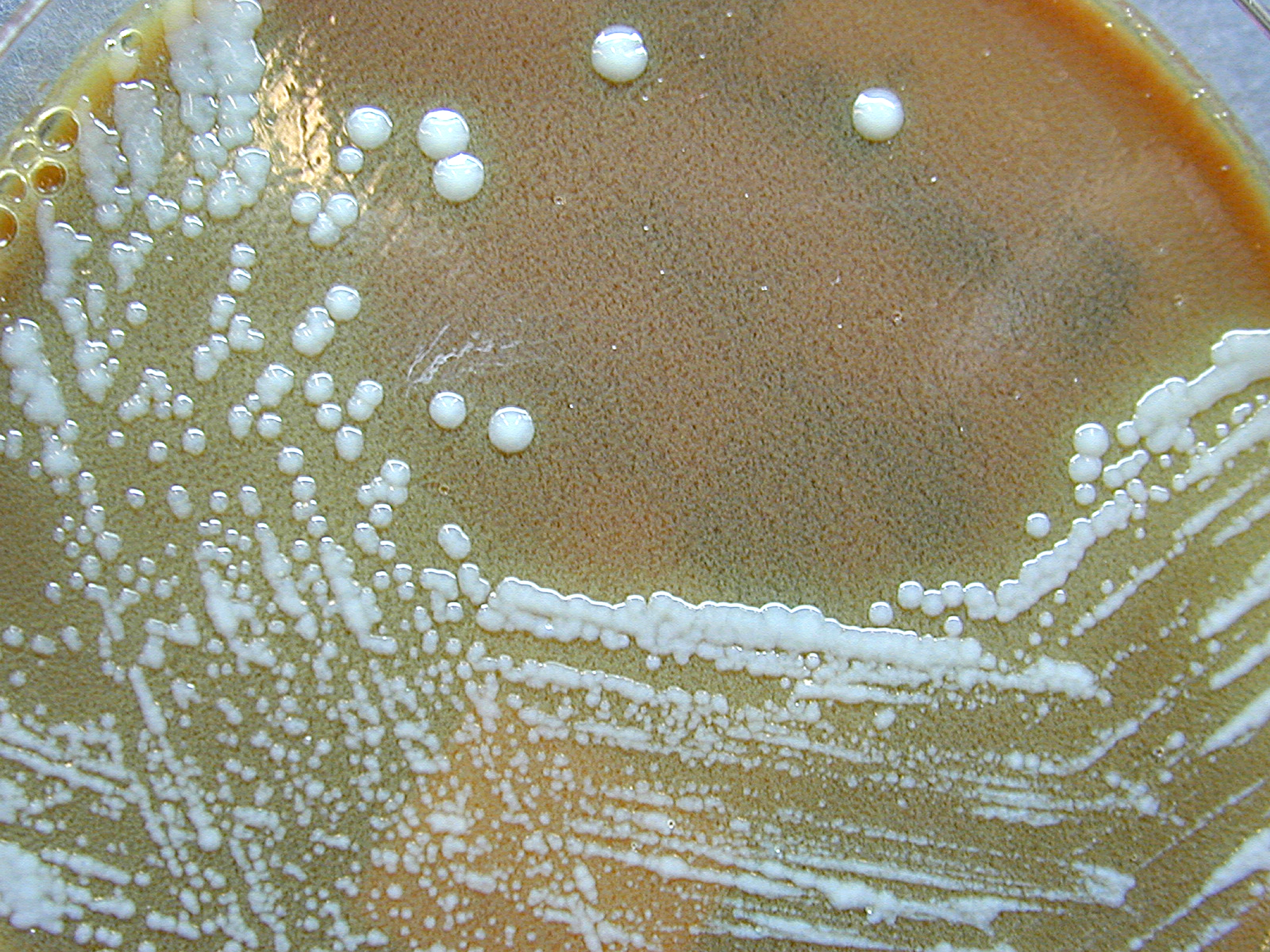
F. tularensis colonies on an agar plate

=== Diagnosis ===
Infection by F. tularensis is diagnosed by clinicians based on symptoms and patient history, imaging, and laboratory studies.

=== Treatment ===
Tularemia is treated with antibiotics, such as aminoglycosides, tetracyclines, or fluoroquinolones. About 15 proteins were suggested that could facilitate drug and vaccine design pipeline.

=== Prevention ===
Preventive measures include preventing bites from ticks, flies, and mosquitos; ensuring that all game is cooked thoroughly; refraining from drinking untreated water and using insect repellents. If working with cultures of F. tularensis, in the lab, wear a gown, impermeable gloves, mask, and eye protection. When dressing game, wear impermeable gloves. A live attenuated vaccine is available for individuals who are at high risk for exposure such, as laboratory personnel.

== Genomics ==
- Francisella Genome Projects (from Genomes OnLine Database)
- Comparative Analysis of Francisella Genomes (at DOE's IMG system)

== See also ==
- Francisella small RNA
