= Thiosulfate dehydrogenase =

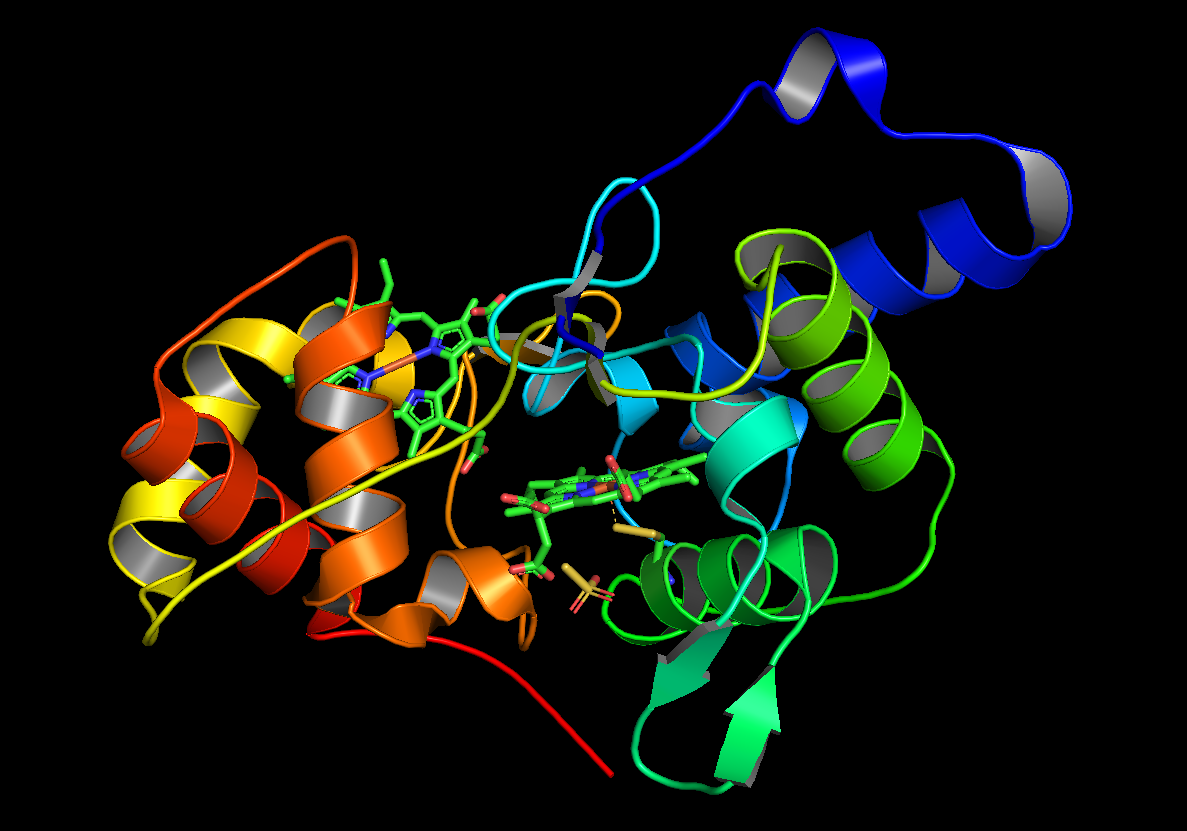
- 3D structure of thiosulfate dehydrogenase with thiosulfate substrate present in the active site, corresponding to RCSB code 4V2K

Identifiers
- EC no.: 1.8.2.2
- CAS no.: 9076-88-4

Databases
- IntEnz: IntEnz view
- BRENDA: BRENDA entry
- ExPASy: NiceZyme view
- KEGG: KEGG entry
- MetaCyc: metabolic pathway
- PRIAM: profile
- PDB structures: RCSB PDB PDBe PDBsum
- Gene Ontology: AmiGO / QuickGO
Search
- PMC: articles
- PubMed: articles
- NCBI: proteins

Thiosulfate dehydrogenase (abbreviated as TsdA) (EC 1.8.2.2) is an enzyme that catalyzes the chemical reaction:

2 thiosulfate + 2 ferricytochrome c $\rightleftharpoons$ tetrathionate + 2 ferrocytochrome c

Thus, the two substrates of this enzyme are thiosulfate and ferricytochrome c, whereas its two products are tetrathionate and ferrocytochrome c.

Thiosulfate dehydrogenase homologues have been isolated from numerous bacterial species and differ slightly in structure but have analogous function and mechanism of sulfur oxidation. The enzyme is similar in both function and structure to a few enzymes in the Sox sulfur oxidation pathway.

== Nomenclature ==
This enzyme belongs to the family of oxidoreductases, specifically those acting on a sulfur group of donors with a cytochrome as acceptor. The systematic name of this enzyme class is thiosulfate:ferricytochrome-c oxidoreductase. Other names in common use include tetrathionate synthase, thiosulfate oxidase, thiosulfate-oxidizing enzyme, and thiosulfate-acceptor oxidoreductase.

== Structure ==
Thiosulfate dehydrogenase, isolated from the appreciably studied bacterial strain Allochromatium vinosum (253 peptide chain length, 25.8 kDa) is composed of two catalytic domains, each similar to cytochrome c, linked by a long unstructured peptide chain. The N-terminal domain is structurally homologous to the SoxA family of cytochrome enzymes while the C-terminal domain is representative of the standard mitochondrial cytochrome c family fold with high similarity to nitrite reductase from P. haloplanktis. Each domain contains a covalently bound iron-containing heme molecule separated by a short distance of 8.1 Å which assists with rapid electron transfer. Both the N and C terminus domains contain 4 α helices (surrounding the heme in the corresponding domain) and a two-stranded anti-parallel β sheet, suggesting the enzyme resulted from a gene duplication event.

The single active site of the enzyme is located in between the two domains (closer to the C-terminus domain) near the central iron heme.

== Mechanism ==
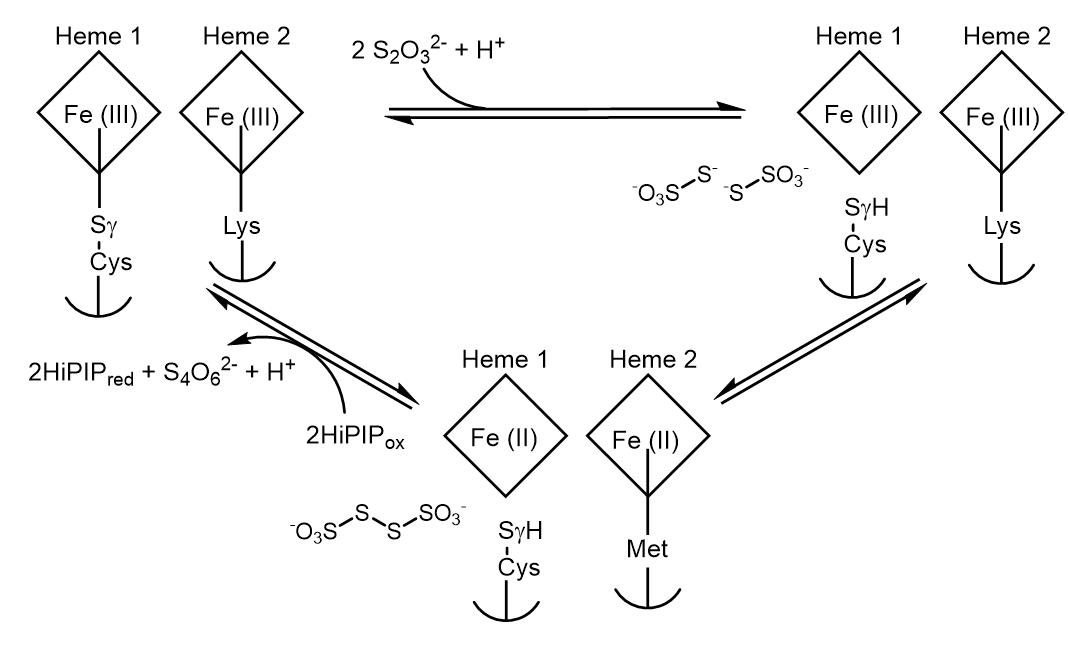
Proposed mechanistic process of the reversible conversion of thiosulfate to tetrathionate in A. vinosum, catalyzed by a cysteine residue and two iron-containing hemes.

There is controversy to the exact mechanism that the enzyme enables to occur, so the process remains ambiguous. Additionally, the variety of thiosulfate dehydrogenase enzymes among bacterial species implies several possible mechanisms of activity. However, due to the striking similarity in structure the domains of thiosulfate dehydrogenase have to sulfur carrier protein SoxYZ and cytochrome SoxAX, a related mechanism can be derived for the thiosulfate dehydrogenase-catalyzed reaction in A. vinosum. The overall, generalized overview of the proposed mechanism of thiosulfate dehydrogenase can be summarized by the following two reversible redox reactions:

1. $\ce{TsdA-Cys-S^- + S2O3^2- <-> TsdA-Cys-S-S2O3^- + 2e^2-}$
2. $\ce{TsdA-Cys-S-S2O3^- + S2O3^2- <-> TsdA-Cys^- + S4O6^2-}$

Step 1 indicates an initial binding of thiosulfate to an unusual and reactive cysteine S-sulphane adduct, forming a S-thiosulfonate adduct. Step 2 follows with an additional thiosulfate to subsequently form tetrathionate while reducing both hemes and leaving a typical cysteine residue. In the active site, the cysteine residue bound to the catalytic iron heme is essential for enzymatic activity, as the abolishment of this residue completely eliminated the enzyme's ability to both oxidize thiosulfate and reduce tetrathionate. In A. vinosum, although the process is reversible, the reaction to form two thiosulfate ions is much slower than the formation of tetrathionate despite the reduction of tetrathionate to thiosulfate having a potential of +198 mV.

Reduction of the enzyme results in a ligand switch from Lys208 to Met209 in the second heme. Mutant proteins that replace Met209 with asparagine or glycine have similar substrate affinities to the wildtype variant but have much lower specific activities, suggesting that heme 2 is the electron exit point in the last steps of the mechanism. Upon the reduction of heme 2 and the ligand switch, the redox potential is increased and hinders the back reaction to form thiosulfate. Here, it is suggested that a high potential iron-sulfur protein (HiPIP) serves as the electron acceptor in the oxidation of both hemes to their initial state.

== Function ==
The oxidation of thiosulfate to tetrathionate is observed in several thiobacilli, phototrophs, and heterotrophs, as thiosulfate and tetrathionate play the role of electron donor and electron acceptor, respectively, in many bacterial species. Both compounds are intermediates in and play an important role in the biogeochemical sulfur cycle, the process of conversion between sulfide and sulfate. Thus, thiosulfate dehydrogenase is essential for the conversion between the intermediates in the sulfur cycle. The sulfur cycle enables a variety of bacteria to utilize generated thiosulfate as an electron donor for aerobic growth and anaerobic carbon dioxide fixation for photosynthesis. Pseudomonas and Halomonas are examples of the many thiobacteria that utilize thiosulfate dehydrogenase to derive energy from thiosulfate as a supplemental energy source. Tetrathionate can serve as a respiratory electron acceptor during anaerobic respiration by tetrathionate reduction.

== Industrial applications ==
Thiobacteria such as Acidithiobacillus ferrooxidans have become essential to industrial bioleaching applications, as the microorganisms are able to oxidize iron and sulfur from iron-sulfur minerals as energy sources, supporting their own autotrophic growth while producing ferric iron and sulfuric acid. Thus, bacteria have been isolated from mineral deposits and used in the treatment of refractory gold and iron ores and detoxification of industrial waste products, sewage, and soils contaminated with heavy metals.
