= Natura Siberica =

Organic cosmetics company based in Tallinn, Estonia

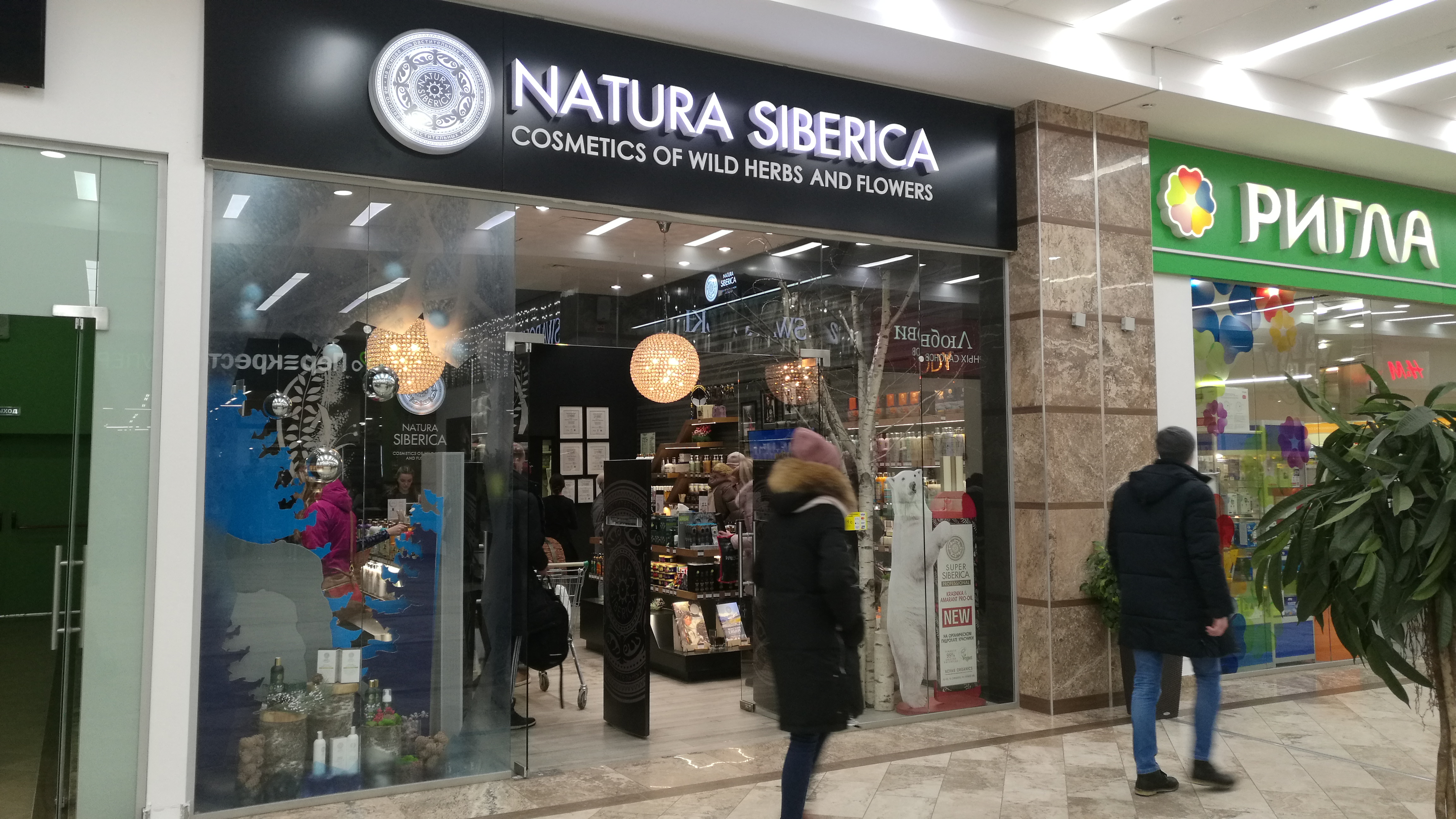
- Nature Siberica store in the "Voyage" shopping center in Tyumen, Russia
- Type: Brand
- Industry: Cosmetic industry
- Founded: 2008; 18 years ago
- Founder: Andrey Trubnikov
- Headquarters: Moscow, Russia
- Area served: Worldwide
- Products: Natural cosmetic products made from wild Siberian plants and herbs
- Total equity: $31.2 million (2017)
- Website: eurobiolab.com naturasiberica.co.uk

Natura Siberica is a global organic cosmetics company, selling worldwide. The company aims to provide natural products made from wild Siberian plants and herbs.

As of 2017 Natura Siberica operates 70 own brand stores, and sells its products in more than 40 countries. As of March 2019 Natura Siberica produces up to 200 different products, including products for body, skin, hair, and makeup which are sold in 60 countries.

Natura Siberica is a trademarked brand, privately owned and manufactured by Eurobio Lab, a company based in Estonia, EU.

As of 2022, Natura Siberica employs over 330 employees involved in brand development, design, certification, production, sales and logistics. Natura Siberica have partners in more than 70 countries around the world, providing employment opportunities and support for local businesses.

== History ==
Natura Siberica was founded by Andrey Trubnikov in 2008.

Andrey Trubnikov died intestate on 7 January 2021, due to the consequences of chronic diseases.

Trubnikov's loss provoked a huge corporate dispute because his 60% stake was automatically put under trust and crisis management, and a 40% stake belonged to his first wife, Irina Trubnikova. On 1 September 2021, Natura Siberica stopped the production and sales of several of the company's trademarks, and 80 retail stores were closed after OU Good Design of Irina Trubnikova terminated the multi-license contract with "Pervoye Reshenie," the main legal entity of Natura Siberica, as well as with the Natura Siberica operational company.

On 21 May 2020, a huge fire accident took place at the Dmitrovsky pilot plant of aluminum tin tapes in facilities rented by Natura Siberica. The plant was almost completely burned. Two claims were filed in the arbitration court by the plant as well as by En+Recycling company, whose claim was subsequently replaced by Ingosstrakh. In August 2021, according to the court's decision, all belongings of "Pervoye Reshenie," the main legal entity of the Natura Siberica company, were put under arrest. Two employees of Natura Siberica were also found guilty.

In September 2021, the arbitration court of the Moscow region ordered Natura Siberica to pay about 2.9 billion roubles, upholding in part the claim of Ingosstrakh (1.494 billion roubles instead of 1.5) and of the Dmitrovsky pilot plant of aluminum tin tapes (1.365 billion roubles instead of 2.7), both related to Oleg Deripaska. Only a couple of days later, Natura Siberica filed three claims, one of them for about 1.67 billion roubles, in the arbitration court of Moscow against Irina Trubnikova, co-owner of the company and first wife of Andrey Trubnikov, as well as against her Estonian-based company, OU Good Design. The respondent party was alleged to have taken actions detrimental to Natura Siberica’s reputation and financial health by funneling abroad its underpriced trademarks in 2020. At the end of September 2021, Natura Siberica fired Irina Trubnikova for absence without leave and for causing harm to the business. In January 2022, Natura Siberica production resumed its activity in Dmitrov under the new CEO of all the holding’s companies, Felix Lieb, a former Sistema top manager.
