= Piscirickettsiaceae =

Scientific classification
- Domain: Bacteria
- Kingdom: Pseudomonadati
- Phylum: Pseudomonadota
- Class: Gammaproteobacteria
- Order: Thiotrichales
- Family: Piscirickettsiaceae; Fryer and Lannan 2005

Genera
- Cycloclasticus; Galenea; Hydrogenovibrio; Methylophaga; Piscirickettsia; Sulfurivirga; Thiomicrorhabdus; Thiomicrospira; Thiosulfatimonas; Thiosulfativibrio

Family of bacteria

The Piscirickettsiaceae are a family of Pseudomonadota. All species are aerobes found in water. The species Piscirickettsia salmonis is a fish pathogen and causes piscirickettsiosis in salmonid fishes. It lives in cells of infected hosts and cannot be cultured on artificial media. Piscirickettsia salmonis is nonmotile, whereas the other five genera are motile by using a single flagellum.
