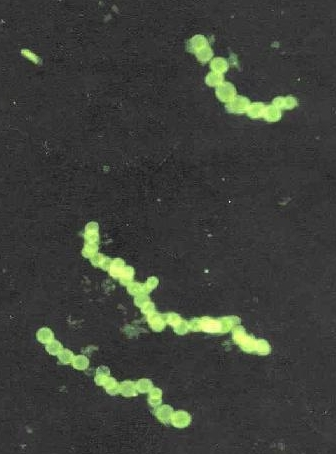
- Thiomargarita namibiensis

Scientific classification
- Domain: Bacteria
- Kingdom: Pseudomonadati
- Phylum: Pseudomonadota
- Class: Gammaproteobacteria
- Order: Thiotrichales; Garrity et al. 2005

Families
- Fastidiosibacteraceae; Francisellaceae; Piscirickettsiaceae; Thiofilaceae; Thiolinaceae; Thiotrichaceae

= Thiotrichales =

Order of bacteria

Thiotrichales is an order of sulfur-oxidizing bacteria within the class Gammaproteobacteria known for their large size and ability to live in sulfur rich environments.

== Characteristics ==
Members of this order have an important role in the sulfur and nitrogen cycles in marine and freshwater sediments, hydrothermal vents, and within soil. Most species oxidize sulfur compounds for energy metabolism. They often use nitrate as an electron acceptor, which contributes to the detoxification of sulfide-rich environments.

The largest known species of bacteria (Thiomargarita magnifica) belongs to this order as does the potential bioweapon Francisella tularensis.

== Ecological importance ==
They can form symbiotic relationships with other organisms, mostly marine invertebrates like mussels and worms. They help these organisms survive in environments lacking nutrients by performing sulfur oxidation which provides them with needed nutrients. This is especially important in environments that contain high levels of toxic hydrogen sulfide. Through sulfur oxidation, Thiotricales effectively detoxify sulfide in marine and freshwater sediments, hydrothermal vents, and areas with large accumulations of organic matter making the regions more hospitable to other organisms.
