= Dissimilatory iron reducing bacteria =

Iron is a metal with strong redox activity. It exists mainly in the natural environment in two forms: divalent iron (Fe(II)) and trivalent iron (Fe(III)). It is one of the most widely distributed metals on Earth. Although dissimilatory iron reduction is an anaerobic process in which Fe(III) serves as a terminal electron acceptor, it is for energy production instead of oxygen. It is a fundamental process in industrial and environmental contexts, playing a key role in processes including bioremediation, electrobiosynthesis, and biogeochemical recycling.

Iron reduction occurs through two major mechanisms: abiotic (chemical) reduction and biotic (microbial) reduction. Among these, biologically processes are particularly significant in natural environments and are increasingly leveraged in sustainable technologies for metal recovery and environmental remediation.

== Overview of iron-reducing bacteria (IRB) ==
Iron-reducing bacteria are one of the most important bacterial groups present in various environments. Their main reaction is to reduce ferric iron to ferrous iron. Microorganisms play a vital role in the natural transformation of iron from solute to precipitate. Iron-reducing metabolic pathways can be carried out in aerobic or anaerobic environments, but IRB mainly operate under anaerobic and micro-aerobic conditions. As of 2016, more than 71 facultative IRB have been identified, with morphologies ranging from cocci to comma-shaped and rod-shaped.

Under anaerobic conditions, IRB utilize ferric iron (Fe(III)) as a terminal electron acceptor to support the anaerobic degradation of various organic compounds. The consumption of these organic substrates and the production of CO_{2} are key indicators of their metabolic activity.

Some IRB species, such as Shewanella putrefaciens, Shewanella algae, and certain Pseudomonas spp., are facultative anaerobes capable of utilizing multiple electron acceptors, including oxygen. However, when Fe^{3+} is used as the terminal electron acceptor, their efficiency in oxidizing organic electron donors is significantly reduced. In such cases, compounds like lactate and pyruvate are oxidized to acetate.

== Importance in Biogeochemical Cycle ==
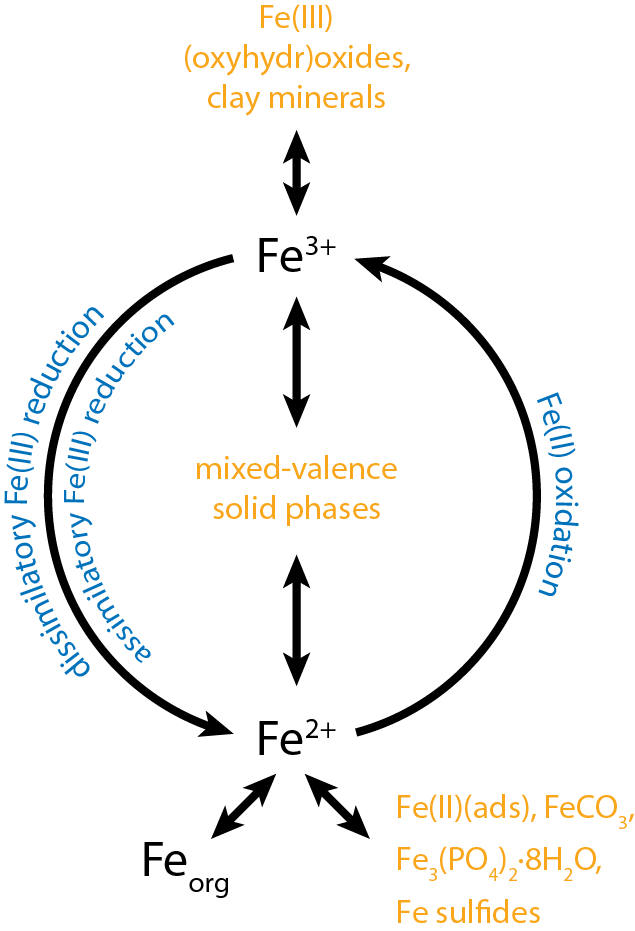
Transformations of iron between oxidation states as mediated by microbes

Iron reduction plays a key role in biogeochemical cycles, influencing a variety of environmental processes and the cycling of other elements. For example, processes such as nitrogen and sulfur cycles, anaerobic ammonium oxidation with iron reduction, and sulfur-driven iron reduction highlight the interconnectedness of these cycles in terrestrial and aquatic ecosystems.

The discovery of microbial iron reduction as a key environmental process marked a significant advancement in the understanding of subsurface biogeochemistry. Microbial iron reduction not only contributes to greenhouse gas formation but also regulates the dynamics of nutrients and contaminants in aquatic systems.

In addition, in terrestrial soils, iron redox cycles are closely linked to carbon and nitrogen cycles. By mediating essential biological and chemical reactions, iron reduction is a key driver of soil ecological functions, soil fertility, and nutrient availability.

== Historical Background and Discovery ==
Microbial iron reduction is one of the oldest metabolic processes on Earth. Direct fossil evidence of early microbial life on Earth is scarce. Some microbiological data suggest that both sulfate reduction and iron reduction are the earliest forms of microbial respiration. Furthermore, Fe isotope geochemistry may provide a new method to identify microbial iron reduction early in Earth history.

Studies have shown that the geological record of dissimilatory iron reduction (DIR) extends back to more than 560 million years ago (Myr) and confirms that microorganisms closely related to the last common ancestor could reduce Fe(III).

== Metabolic process ==
=== Overall reaction ===
Dissimilatory iron reduction is an anaerobic process catabolized by bacteria that involves the oxidation of organic acids/H_{2} and the reduction of extracellular iron. A representative reaction utilizing acetate as the organic acid electron donor and ferric iron ((Fe(III)) as the terminal electron acceptor, while ferrous iron ((Fe(II)), carbon dioxide, and energy are produced, is shown below. A wide variety of organic acids can be used as reductants for dissimilatory iron reduction. This process typically occurs on the cell surface or extracellularly.

CH_{3}COO^{-} + 8Fe^{3+} + 3H_{2}O -> 8Fe^{2+} + HCO_{3}^{-} + CO_{2} + 8H^{+} + 814 kJ/reaction

=== Electron transport ===
Bacteria utilize a variety of methods to transfer electrons onto solid state ferric iron. Microorganisms typically form biofilms on the surface of iron minerals due to the role extracellular polymeric substances play in mediated electron transfer. The four primary methods of electron transfer include: 1) direct contact, 2) ligand mediation, 3) electron shuttling, and 4) pili (nanowires).

Direct contact involves the physical interaction between the surface of the iron mineral and the bacteria. This process is mediated in Shewanella oneidensis by the MR-1 pathway which directly transfers electrons onto the solid state iron via cytochromes. The MR-1 pathway involves the periplasmic transfer of electrons from the cytoplasmic quinol oxidase protein CymA to an outer membrane c-type cytochrome MtrABC complex; other proteins also play an unknown role in cell surface electron transfer.

Ligand-mediated electron transfer involves the use of chelating agents or ligands produced by bacteria to solubilize ferric iron from minerals, increasing its bioavailability. These ligands, often organic acids or siderophores, bind to the iron minerals, forming soluble complexes that are reduced at the cell surface or in the extracellular environment.

Electron shuttling involves the use of redox-active compounds that act as intermediates to transfer electrons from the bacterial cell to Fe(III). These shuttles, which can be endogenous or exogenous, cycle between reduced and oxidized states. Common examples include humic substances, flavins and quinones secreted by Shewanella species. After being reduced by the microbes, the shuttle diffuses to the ferric iron mineral, donates electrons, and returns to the cell in its oxidized form to repeat the cycle. This mechanism allows the bacteria to reduce iron at a distance.

Pili (also known as nanowires), are electrically conductive appendages that facilitate long-range electron transfer and are produced by some iron-reducing bacteria, such as Geobacter sulfurreducens. These pili are protein filaments and contain aromatic amino acids and cytochromes which enable efficient electron conduction from the cell to distant iron minerals. Nanowires are particularly important in biofilms, where they form a network that increases electron transfer efficiency and supports microbial community interaction.

== Phylogenetic diversity and evolutionary relationships ==
=== Distribution of iron-reducing pathways across Bacteria and Archaea ===
Iron-reducing pathways are phylogenetically widespread, occurring in both Bacteria and Archaea. Most cultured dissimilatory iron-reducing bacteria (DIRB) are affiliated with the class Deltaproteobacteria, including genera such as Geobacter and Shewanella. However, Fe(III) reduction has also been observed in Gammaproteobacteria (e.g., Shewanella alga), Epsilonproteobacteria (e.g., Geospirillum barnesii), and Firmicutes (e.g., Desulfotomaculum reducens). In the archaeal domain, thermophilic species such as Ferroglobus placidus have also demonstrated iron-reducing capabilities. Additionally, organisms like Sinorhodobacter ferrireducens exhibit iron-reducing traits despite falling outside traditional IRB lineages, suggesting horizontal gene transfer or convergent evolution.

=== Evolutionary origins of ferric iron reduction ===
Dissimilatory iron reduction is considered one of the earliest respiratory pathways to evolve, possibly predating nitrate and oxygen respiration. Ferric reductases are predicted to have evolved around 3.5 billion years ago, following the formation of Fe(III) via ultraviolet-driven oxidation and anaerobic photosynthesis using Fe^{2+} as an electron donor.

Comparative studies of ferric reductase enzymes suggest that iron reduction evolved independently in multiple microbial lineages. For example, the ferric reductase in the archaeon Archaeoglobus fulgidus shares structural features with bacterial flavin reductases but lacks sequence similarity, implying convergent evolution or horizontal gene transfer across domains.

Fossilized microbial mats from iron-rich hydrothermal environments also indicate that microbial iron cycling was active in early anoxic ecosystems. These ancient microbial communities may have contributed to Fe(III) accumulation and created conditions favorable for the emergence of iron-reducing pathways.

=== Sulfate-reducing bacteria (SRB) and Fe(III) reduction ===
Although sulfate-reducing bacteria (SRB) are primarily associated with the reduction of sulfate (SO_{4}^{2-}), several species have demonstrated the ability to reduce ferric iron. Organisms such as Desulfobulbus propionicus and Desulfotomaculum reducens are capable of using Fe(III) as an electron acceptor under laboratory conditions. These dual capabilities may enable SRB to adapt to fluctuating redox environments in marine sediments, where the availability of sulfate and iron can vary over time.

=== Evolutionary relationship of IRB and SRB ===
Phylogenetic studies indicate that IRB and SRB are closely related. Members of the Geobacteraceae family, which includes well-studied IRB, share phylogenetic proximity to sulfate reducers such as Desulfomonile tiedjei and Desulfobulbus spp. Some SRB that reduce Fe(III) possess homologous electron transport components to those found in IRB, supporting a shared ancestry or the possibility of horizontal gene transfer of iron-reducing capabilities.

=== Similarities in electron transport mechanisms ===
Both iron-reducing bacteria (IRB) and sulfate-reducing bacteria (SRB) rely on extracellular electron transfer (EET) to access insoluble electron acceptors such as ferric iron (Fe(III)) oxides or metallic iron surfaces. SRB have also been implicated in the corrosion of iron, with evidence suggesting direct electron uptake via semiconductive mineral layers like iron sulfides. These mechanistic similarities may reflect convergent strategies for extracellular respiration.

=== Ecological interactions and co-occurrence ===
In natural environments such as coastal sediments and wetlands, IRB and SRB often co-exist. In high-organic-carbon environments like acid sulfate soils, both groups can function simultaneously without outcompeting each other due to the abundance of electron donors and acceptors. Under sulfate-limited conditions, iron reduction may become the dominant anaerobic respiration process. Environmental parameters such as redox potential, iron and sulfate availability, and organic matter content are key factors shaping the spatial distribution and activity of IRB and SRB in marine ecosystems.

== Distribution and Environmental Conditions ==
Iron-reducing bacteria (IRB) inhabit suboxic and anoxic regions, rich in organic matter and iron, which serve as crucial components in their metabolic processes. Despite these specific environmental conditions, IRB inhabit a wide array of terrestrial and aquatic environmental settings. These range from grasslands and riverbeds to continental shelves and deep-sea sediments. However, their primary niche is occupying marine and freshwater sediments, where the combination of nutrient availability and redox conditions support their metabolic activity.

While IRB thrive in coastal waters, estuaries, and oceanic sediments, their distribution is highly variable across different environments. For example, open ocean sediments contain decreased iron levels, which contrasts with coastal and continental shelf sediments, and therefore are less suitable for IRB colonization. Within the sediment column itself, IRB can be found primarily in layers near the surface, where the organic matter and iron content foster IRB activity. They can extend deeper down through the sulfate methane transition zone (SMTZ) into the methanic zone as well. The expansive distribution of IRB also extends to a variety of extreme environments including oilfields, polar regions, mines, and hydrothermal vents. The harsh conditions of these environments demonstrate the versatility and adaptability of some IRB, enabling them to persist in specialized and demanding ecological niches.

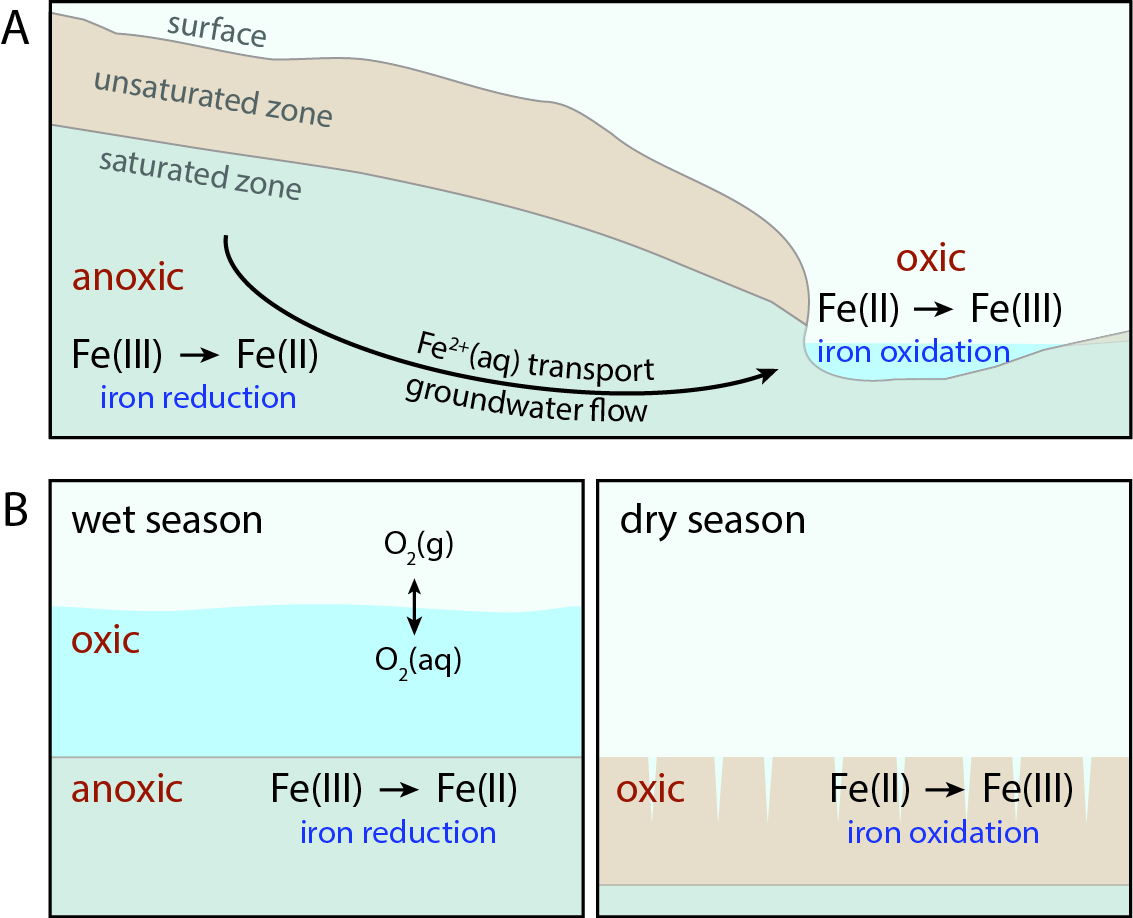
Seasonal precipitation and ground water impact on microbial iron cycling and iron redox processes.

The hydrological cycle plays a crucial role in significantly influencing IRB metabolic processes. Variations in groundwater and especially precipitation, impact IRB-suitable habitats and their metabolic efficiency. Precipitation plays a key role in altering oxygen content in wetlands, which can benefit or prevent iron reduction, depending on the sedimentary depth of the IRB. Additionally, precipitation contributes to increased groundwater flow and aquatic currents, which improves mineral advection. This enhanced advection facilitates the transportation of ferric iron (Fe(III)), increasing its availability as the electron acceptor for IRB. Precipitation also affects IRB through its influence on rainwater and oxic weathering. By modifying the soil and groundwater iron and mineral content, weathering further adjusts the conditions required for IRB activity. Similarly, periodic flooding of grasslands and rice patties also improves IRB metabolic efficacy.

Sedimentation due to hydrological impacts listed above, as well as other natural processes, shapes the potential habitats of IRB. The rate of deposition can greatly impact the potential creation and removal of aquatic sediment. With increased sedimentation, the amount of anoxic iron-rich sediment will increase, benefiting IRB dispersion. In contrast, the removal of sediment due to fast currents, or low rates of sedimentation will expose deeper layers to oxygen, restricting IRB activity. This variation in aquatic sedimentation will create a dynamic setting for IRB growth.

The seasonal cycle of thawing and melting in permafrost regions also creates dynamic conditions for IRB. The thawing process of permafrost results in an anoxic setting, which supports iron reduction and IRB metabolic activity. On the other hand, preserved permafrost maintains oxic conditions, preventing IRB from conducting iron reduction. These seasonal fluctuations in permafrost create a cycle of changing opportunities for IRB metabolic activity and iron reduction.

Iron-reducing bacteria (IRB) display exceptional flexibility to physicochemical factors such as temperature, salinity, and pH. Despite the majority of IRB preferring a mesophilic temperature range from 20 °C to 40 °C, a minority of extremophiles prevail in niches such as hydrothermal vents, which can exceed 80 °C. Similarly, IRB are predominantly neutrophilic, with a preferred range of 6 to 8 pH, however, a few IRB are considered acidophilic or alkaliphilic. This minority of IRB inhabit pH ranges below 5 pH and above 9 pH, respectively, in ecological niches such as mine drainage sites or soda lake sediment. Just as with pH and temperature, IRB are largely resilient to saline conditions. This is exhibited by their geographic distribution in both freshwater and marine environments. On the extreme end, IRB had been observed in hypersaline lake sediments, which contained 5M of NaCl. Despite the extremophilic nature of some IRB, very few are tolerant of multiple extreme physicochemical factors. IRB occupying niches outside of the preferred physicochemical ranges experience reduced growth and metabolic activity.

== Environmental significance ==
=== Role in Iron cycle ===
The bacterial iron cycle is based on the bacterially mediated oxidation of Fe2+ bicarbonate under O2 limiting conditions (anoxic) and ends with the formation of Fe(OH)3 ferrihydrite, which is easily accessible for reduction by iron-reducing bacteria. Formation of ferrihydrite in anoxic environments occurs through two phototrophic pathways involving either cyanobacteria or nonsulfur purple bacteria.

== Possible uses of IRB in Bioremediation ==
=== Mercury Methylation ===
Mercury (Hg) pollution affects water sources and poses a human health concern. Mercury methylation is an anaerobic microbial process usually driven by dissimilatory sulfate-reducing bacteria (DSRB). This process produces methylmercury (MeHg), which can be transferred from the sediments to water and organisms and bioaccumulates easily.

Dissimilatory iron-reducing bacteria (DIRB) may mediate mercury methylation, as it has been shown that the mercury methylation rate is positively correlated with the iron reduction rate, implying that Fe(III) reduction stimulates the formation of MeHg.

Iron availability influences this process in two ways. First, it can change the activity rate of dissimilatory iron-reducing bacteria (DIRB) compared to DSRB. Second, it can alter the chemistry of mercury, affecting its bioavailability. However, the relationship of mercury methylation with iron reduction most likely depends on the physiological characteristics of the DIRB present in an area.

=== Removal of organic matter ===
Urbanization and poor sewage management introduce organic pollutants to rivers, which accumulate in sediments. This leads to water degradation and anaerobic water bodies, where organic matter (OM) is transformed into odorous substances.

One possible solution to this problem is using DIRB to metabolize the OM in the sediments under anaerobic conditions. OM serves as an electron donor in sediments, supporting iron reduction by DIRB; consequently, higher sediment pollution levels result in increased iron reduction by DIRB. Large amounts of DIRB result in better-sustained removal of OM, and sediments enriched with iron, nitrogen and sulphur allowed DIRB to improve iron reduction because, under iron-limiting conditions, they can use extracellular electron shuttles to enhance further Fe(III) reduction.

DIRB communities with high diversity and adaptability are considered the best choice for OM bioremediation. However, their performance is affected by local environmental factors, and different DIRBs have different environmental sensitivities.

=== Removal of heavy metals ===
Rapid industrialization has led to an increased demand for Copper (Cu), and the combination of bigger mine sizes and declining copper ore grades has resulted in higher copper tailings. Copper tailings occupy an extensive farmland and forest land area, negatively impacting food safety.

IRB reduce Fe (III) to Fe (II) and therefore decrease the environmental redox potential. Directly adding IRB to an environment leads to competition and co-existence with the local microbial community, causing shifts in the microbial composition that alter the tailing environment. The iron reduction process also alters the microbial community, promoting detoxification of heavy metals in sediments.

Some bioremediation attempts have used both SRB and IRB, which increased the pH and permeation time of the copper tailings. Reducing tailings permeability decreases water and oxygen infiltration in mine tailings, reducing oxidation and creating an anoxic environment that increases iron reduction rates, immobilizes heavy metals, and supports their conversion into sulphides. However, remediation effects may vary with depth due to changes in the microbial community composition.

=== Dechlorination of organic coumpounds ===
Chlorinated organic compounds are toxic to organisms and difficult to degrade. Some DIRBS have dechlorination genes that allow them to dechlorinate these pollutants partially; these abilities can be enhanced through genetic engineering. The dechlorination process starts when DIRB converts Fe(III) to Fe(II), which helps remove chlorinated pollutants. Fe(II) species can react with chlorinated organic compounds directly and accelerate dechlorination. Furthermore, the close union of Fe(II) atoms promotes electron transfer reactions characteristic of dechlorination. This type of dechlorination is abiotic and interacts with the biotic pathway (cell-mediated).

However, excess DIRB can also hinder dechlorination; thus, maintaining an appropriate DIRB dosage is essential to ensure effective pollutant removal. Furthermore, DIRB can also release nutrients to the environment, enhancing the dechlorination abilities of other bacteria.

Even if possible, using only DIRB for dechlorination is not ideal because they have a low degradation rate and produce intermediate toxic substances. For this reason, research is being done on coupling DIRB with other microorganisms, chemical materials, and technology.
