= Geobacter anodireducens =

Scientific classification
- Domain: Bacteria
- Kingdom: Pseudomonadati
- Phylum: Thermodesulfobacteriota
- Class: Desulfuromonadia
- Order: Geobacterales
- Family: Geobacteraceae
- Genus: Geobacter
- Species: G. anodireducens

Binomial name
- Geobacter anodireducens Sun et al. 2014

Type strain
- CGMCC 1.12536, SD-1, KCTC 4672

Synonyms
- Geobacter anodereducens

Species of bacterium

Geobacter anodireducens is a Gram-negative, aerotolerant, exoelectrogenic, anaerobic, non-spore-forming and non-motile bacterium from the genus of Geobacter Like others in its genus, it is commonly found in soil and uses iron as its electron acceptor. Due to its ability to generate current, it is an organism of note for Microbial fuel cell research. G. anodireducens was first isolated in 2014, and characterized in 2019, both by Dan Sun.

== Characteristics ==
G. anodireducens is curved bacillus, most easily distinguished from its cousins Geobacter metallireducens and Geobacter sulfurreducens by its osmotolerance: it is able to withstand nearly twice the salt concentration in solution.

== Genome ==
The genome of G. anodireducens is 3,555,507 base pairs long. The bacteria also contains a plasmid at 110,507 base pairs long. Both are circular. A total of 3,564 genes have been located on the plasmid and genome combined.
