= Geotalea toluenoxydans =

Scientific classification
- Domain: Bacteria
- Kingdom: Pseudomonadati
- Phylum: Proteobacteria
- Class: Desulfuromonadia
- Order: Geobacterales
- Family: Geobacteraceae
- Genus: Geotalea
- Species: G. toluenoxydans

Binomial name
- Geotalea toluenoxydans (Kunapuli et al. 2010) Waite et al. 2020

Type strain
- DSM 19350, JCM 15764, TMJ1

Synonyms
- Geobacter toluenoxydans (Kunapuli et al. 2010)

Species of bacterium

Geotalea toluenoxydans, synonym Geobacter toluenoxydans, is a gram-negative, anaerobic, non-sporulating, and rod-shaped bacterium that comes from the genus Geotalea. G. toluenoxydans has a metabolism that can utilize different electron donors, and its ability to do this has generated attention to its potential uses in metabolizing contaminants and as a source of electrical energy. G. toluenoxydans was first isolated from a sludge near a contaminated aquifer in Stuttgart, Germany.

== Taxonomy ==
Geotalea toluenoxydans belongs to the domain Bacteria, kingdom Pseudomonadati, phylum Thermodesulfobacteriota, class Desulfuromonadia, order Geobacterales, family Geobacteraceae, and genus Geotalea.

Geotalea was included in the class Deltaproteobacteria when it was first considered part of the genus Geobacter. As a part of the Proteobacteria group, Deltaproteobacteria was split into different groups because it was found to be poorly connected to other classes within the Proteobacteria group; it was also difficult to consider it a monophyletic unit based on genomic-phylogeny analysis. This method of analysis involves using genomic data as a way to relate, differentiate, and classify microbes. A monophyletic unit is a group that contains the most recent common ancestor and all of the descendants from the common ancestor.

The 16S rRNA tree shows that G. humireducens (96%) and G. bremensis (95.4%) are the closest relatives in the Geobacter clade. This was before G. toluenoxydans was reclassified into the genus Geotalea. The 16S rRNA phylogenetic tree relies on the 16S rRNA molecular marker gene, which is shared by nearly all bacteria and archaea. This gene is used for phylogeny and to show where groups split from the origin of the 16S rRNA gene.

== Biology and biochemistry ==
=== Physiology ===
G. toluenoxydans is a Gram-negative, obligate anaerobe, non-sporulating, coliform bacteria. G. toluenoxydans are rod-shaped and measure around a width of 0.4 µm and a length of around 2.1 to 3.8 µm.

=== Metabolism ===
The metabolic characteristics of G. toluenoxydans are broad, which indicates metabolic versatility. Members of the Geobacteraceae family often reside in iron (Fe(III)) reducing soil and sediment areas, and often utilize iron (Fe(III)) as an electron acceptor. As an obligate anaerobe, it reduces compounds to use as electron acceptors like fumarate, ferric citrate, and ferrihydrite. G. toluenoxydans uses acetate as its primary electron donor, but it can also oxidize other organic compounds, such as toluene, pyruvate, phenol, p-Cresol, m-Cresol, benzaldehyde, benzyl alcohol, formate, benzoate, and propionate.

=== Culture growth ===
G. toluenoxydans thrives in a culture pH of 6.8 (6.6-7.5) and an optimum growth temperature of 25 to 32°C.

=== Ecology ===
As an obligate anaerobe, G. toluenoxydans was first discovered at a contaminated tar-oil site and isolated from a sludge sample near the site. The sludge came from the ground and is an anaerobic environment for the G. toluenoxydans. The anaerobic conditions and metabolic functions of G. toluenoxydans indicate that it would thrive in anaerobic environments.

== Genomics ==
The genomic size of G. toluenoxydans is 4.2 Megabase pairs (Mb). Mega base pairs are a unit to measure DNA length. The guanine and cytosine content in the DNA is reported to be 54.4 mol%; this means guanine and cytosine make up 54.4% of theDNA bases of G. toluenoxydans. This content verifies the characterization of G. toluenoxydans. The strain TMJ1 also contains 15:0 anteiso fatty acids, meaning its total lipid fatty acid content is composed of a 15-carbon chain with no double bonds, indicating a fully saturated fatty acid. This feature is known to help bacteria with the stability and rigidity of the membrane and can adapt to different temperatures.

== History ==
In 2001, multiple researchers (Umakanth Kunapuli, Michael K. Jahn, Tillman Lueders, Roland Geyer, Hermann J. Heipieper, and Rainer U. Meckenstock) isolated G. toluenoxydans (Strain TMJ1) from a contaminated tar oil site in Stuttgart, Germany. Strictly anaerobic cultivation techniques were used, isolating the microbe in serial liquid dilution-to-extinction (DTE) cultures. This procedure allows scientists to isolate a small number of microorganisms through repeated dilutions until the cells develop their own cultures. The media contains toluene as both the energy and carbon source, as well as an electron acceptor, ferrihydrite, alongside a non-ionic resin called Amberlite XAD-7, which helps maintain toluene in the media. The medium was reduced with 1 mM of iron(II) chloride and then injected with toluene. After 10 transfers of the sample to fresh medium, two consecutive liquid dilutions were performed up to a 10^{-6} dilution to isolate the microbe, and the purity was verified using a phase-contrast microscope.

G. toluenoxydans was reclassified into the genus Geotalea, as Waite et al. (2020) proposed reclassifying Geobacter toluenoxydans into a new genus would better classify the microbe through the basis of genomic-phylogeny analysis.

== Implications ==
=== Bioremediation ===
G. toluenoxydans has a strong implication for bioremediation through the removal of contaminants (fuels and tars) from anaerobic environments. When placed in a strictly anaerobic environment, G. toluenoxydans was capable of using the process of iron reduction to degrade toxic monoaromatic hydrocarbons like toluene. G. toluenoxydan's use of its iron redox mechanism provides a new way for pollutants in anaerobic regions to be degraded. Many contaminated sub-surface environments exist (i.e., sedimentary layers, aquifers, and industrial waste sites) where limited oxygen availability limits the feasibility of typical aerobic biodegradation. Therefore, the ability of Geotalea toluenoxydans to break down toluene via iron reduction demonstrates that the study of this redox mechanism can provide useful information for a renewable method towards the reduction of hydrocarbon contaminants in these sub-surface environments.

=== Electrical energy production ===
There is potential in G. toluenoxydans as a fuel source for bioenergetic fuel cells. The bacteria G. toluenoxydans has shown its capability to grow and reproduce using numerous types of wastes available in microbial electrochemical cells (MECs). MECs are an emerging biotechnology combining microbial metabolism with electrochemical cells. By transferring electrons from a substrate to an electrochemical cell, electricity and hydrogen gas become produced on the cathode from wastewater. G. toluenoxydans was shown to be abundant in the anodic biofilm community in replicate MECs fed with propionate (up to 78-98% relative abundance), and in a replicate of the butyrate-fed MECs with a relative abundance of 30-80%, outcompeting other Geobacter species.

The data obtained demonstrate that specific relationships exist among electrochemically active biofilms. In particular, it seems that G. toluenoxydans would be suited to oxidize propionate and butyrate, two of the main volatile fatty acids (VFAs) formed during the anaerobic digestion process of waste-waters. VFAs are short-chain fatty acids that are produced when organic matter is broken down without oxygen. If too much VFAs are built up in a region, this can lower the pH, create odors, and disturb microbial communities, slowing breakdown processes and making treatment systems less stable. The capability of this bacterium to perform this VFA oxidation may also be through a symbiotic association with another microorganism, for instance, G. metallireducens. This symbiotic relationship involves the degradation of large biomolecules by Geobacter microbes into smaller biomolecules like VFAs, which can then be degraded by G. toluenoxydans. Thus, further studies potentially highlighting how G. toluenoxydans symbiotically works with other Geobacter microbes to metabolize VFAs will further support how eco-engineering could be potentially used for wastewater treatment. For instance, inserting G. toluenoxydans in MEC systems with specialized propionate or butyrate producers found in agricultural waste waters can be studied as a potential method of reliably producing hydrogen and electricity while also degrading organic wastes. Therefore, the possibility of generating renewable electricity by means of redox reactions on volatile fatty acids through G. toluenoxydans may be possible; more research is needed.
