= Geobacter daltonii =

Scientific classification
- Domain: Bacteria
- Kingdom: Pseudomonadati
- Phylum: Thermodesulfobacteriota
- Class: Desulfuromonadia
- Order: Geobacterales
- Family: Geobacteraceae
- Genus: Geobacter
- Species: G. daltonii

Binomial name
- Geobacter daltonii Prakash et al. 2010

Type strain
- DSM 22248, FRC-32, JCM 15807

Synonyms
- Geotalea daltonii (Prakash et al. 2010) Waite et al. 2020

Species of bacterium

Geobacter daltonii is a Gram-negative, Fe(III)- and Uranium(IV)-reducing and non-spore-forming bacterium from the genus of Geobacter. It was isolated from sediments from the Oak Ridge Field Research Center in Oak Ridge, Tennessee in the United States. The specific epithet "daltonii" was refers to Dava Dalton, who performed the initial isolation of the strain, but died shortly thereafter.

== Characteristics ==
Geobacter species are known for their ability to facilitate extracellular electron transfer. A feature of G. daltonii specifically is the pili structures that are electrically conductive allowing for connections to other cells, free minerals in their environment, and other electrodes. This may have implications for the utilization of G. daltonii as a tool in environmental remediation of U(VI). In 2022 a proposal was made to reclassify organisms in the Deltaproteobacteria class, including G. daltonii.
