= Geobacter chapellei =

Scientific classification
- Domain: Bacteria
- Kingdom: Pseudomonadati
- Phylum: Thermodesulfobacteriota
- Class: Desulfuromonadia
- Order: Geobacterales
- Family: Geobacteraceae
- Genus: Geobacter
- Species: G. chapellei

Binomial name
- Geobacter chapellei Coates et al. 2001

Type strain
- 172, ATCC 51744, DSM 13688

Synonyms
- Pelotalea chapellei (Coates et al. 2001) Xu et al. 2022; "Pseudopelobacter chapellei" (Coates et al. 2001) Waite et al. 2020

Species of bacterium

Geobacter chapellei is a Gram-negative, strictly anaerobic, mesophilic and non-motile bacterium from the genus of Geobacter which has been isolated from aquifer sediments from the Atlantic Coastal Plain in the United States.
