= Geobacter bremensis =

Scientific classification
- Domain: Bacteria
- Kingdom: Pseudomonadati
- Phylum: Thermodesulfobacteriota
- Class: Desulfuromonadia
- Order: Geobacterales
- Family: Geobacteraceae
- Genus: Geobacter
- Species: G. bremensis

Binomial name
- Geobacter bremensis Straub & Buchholz-Cleven 2001

Synonyms
- Geomonas bremensis (Straub & Buchholz-Cleven 2001) Xu et al. 2020; Citrifermentans bremense (Straub & Buchholz-Cleven 2001) Waite et al. 2020

Species of bacterium

Geobacter bremensis is a gram-negative, metal-reducing species of bacteria. Isolates of this species were initially discovered in samples of mud from ditches in Bremen, Germany. Isolates of the related species Geobacter pelophilus were found in the same source.

Isolates of G. bremensis have been tested for their use in producing electricity.
