= Geobacter bemidjiensis =

Scientific classification
- Domain: Bacteria
- Kingdom: Pseudomonadati
- Phylum: Thermodesulfobacteriota
- Class: Desulfuromonadia
- Order: Geobacterales
- Family: Geobacteraceae
- Genus: Geobacter
- Species: G. bemidjiensis

Binomial name
- Geobacter bemidjiensis Nevin et al. 2005

Synonyms
- Geomonas bemidjiensis (Straub & Buchholz-Cleven 2001) Xu et al. 2020; Citrifermentans bemidjiense (Nevin et al. 2005) Waite et al. 2020

Species of bacterium

Geobacter bemidjiensis is a Fe(III)-reducing bacteria. It is Gram-negative, slightly curved rod-shaped and is motile via means of monotrichous flagella. Its type strain is Bem^{T} (=ATCC BAA-1014^{T} =DSM 16622^{T} =JCM 12645^{T}).
