= Geobacter argillaceus =

Scientific classification
- Domain: Bacteria
- Kingdom: Pseudomonadati
- Phylum: Thermodesulfobacteriota
- Class: Desulfuromonadia
- Order: Geobacterales
- Family: Geobacteraceae
- Genus: Geobacter
- Species: G. argillaceus

Binomial name
- Geobacter argillaceus Shelobolina et al. 2007

Type strain
- ATCC BAA-1139, G12, JCM 12999

Synonyms
- "Geomobilibacter argillaceus" (Shelobolina et al. 2007) Xu et al. 2021

Species of bacterium

Geobacter argillaceus is a non-spore-forming and motile bacterium from the genus Geobacter which has been isolated from kaolin clay.
