= Geobacter thiogenes =

Scientific classification
- Domain: Bacteria
- Kingdom: Pseudomonadati
- Phylum: Thermodesulfobacteriota
- Class: Desulfuromonadia
- Order: Geobacterales
- Family: Geobacteraceae
- Genus: Geobacter
- Species: G. thiogenes

Binomial name
- Geobacter thiogenes (De Wever et al. 2001) Nevin et al. 2007

Type strain
- ATCC BAA-34, JCM 14045, K1

Synonyms
- Trichlorobacter thiogenes De Wever et al. 2001

Species of bacterium

Geobacter thiogenes is a bacterium from the genus Geobacter.
