= Exoelectrogen =

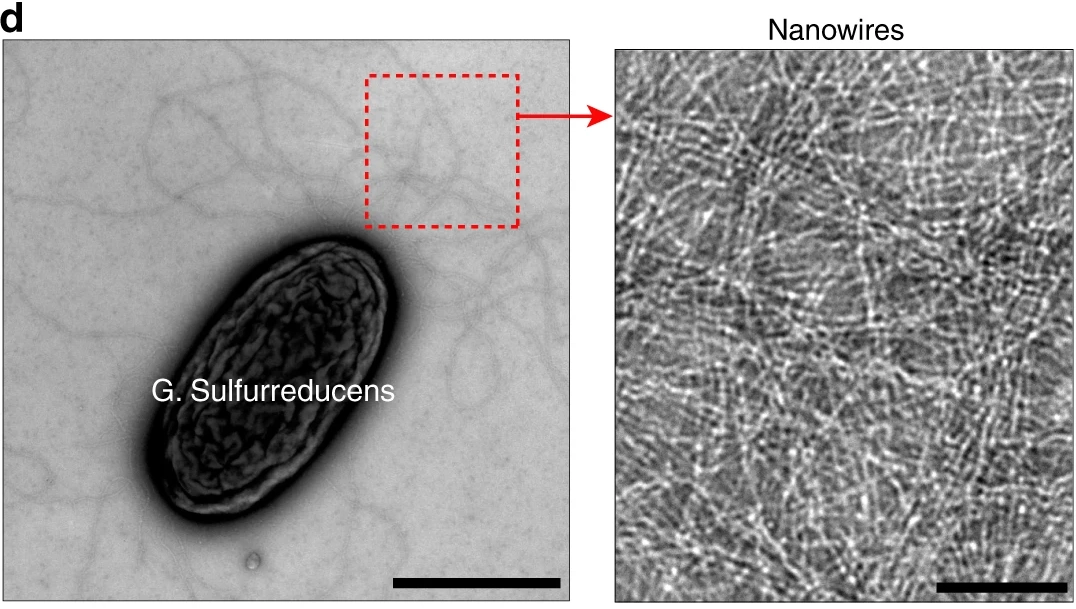
Geobacter sulfurreducens and its bacterial nanowires

An exoelectrogen normally refers to a microorganism that has the ability to transfer electrons extracellularly. While exoelectrogen is the predominant name, other terms have been used: electrochemically active bacteria, anode respiring bacteria, and electricigens. Electrons exocytosed in this fashion are produced following ATP production using an electron transport chain (ETC) during oxidative phosphorylation. Conventional cellular respiration requires a final electron acceptor to receive these electrons. Cells that use molecular oxygen (O_{2}) as their final electron acceptor are described as using aerobic respiration, while cells that use other soluble compounds as their final electron acceptor are described as using anaerobic respiration. However, the final electron acceptor of an exoelectrogen is found extracellularly and can be a strong oxidizing agent in aqueous solution or a solid conductor/electron acceptor. Two commonly observed acceptors are iron compounds (specifically Fe(III) oxides) and manganese compounds (specifically Mn(III/IV) oxides). As oxygen is a strong oxidizer, cells are able to do this strictly in the absence of oxygen.

Utilization of exoelectrogens is currently being researched in the development of microbial fuel cells (MFCs), which hold the potential to convert organic material like activated sludge from waste water treatment into ethanol, hydrogen gas, and electric current.

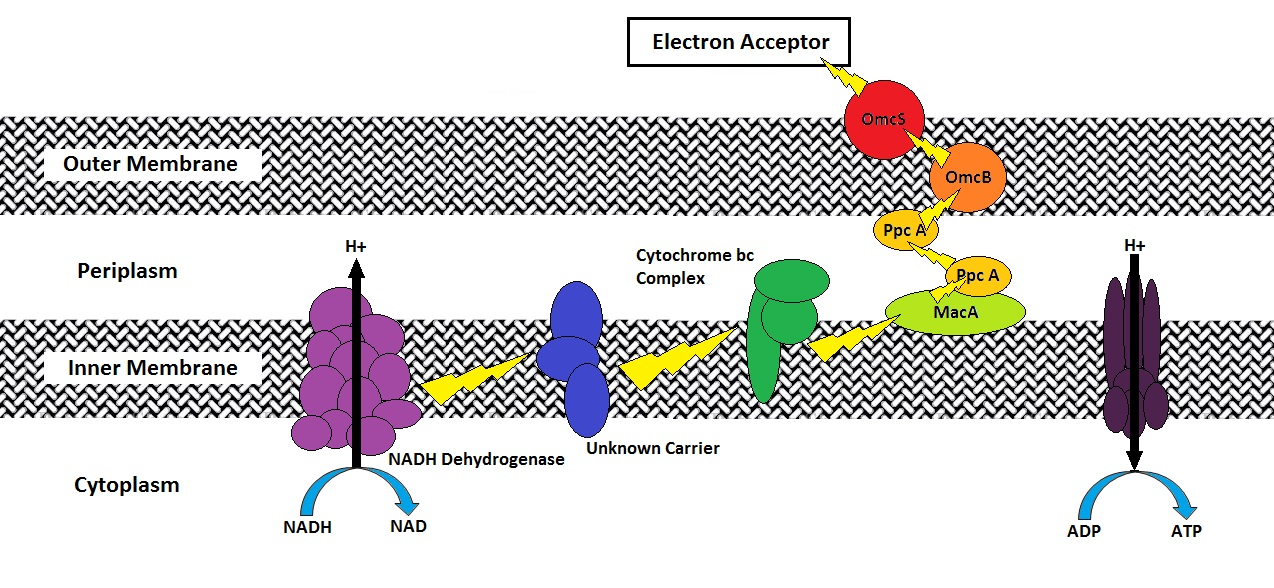
Figure 1. Alternative Electron Transport Chain to move electrons to outer membrane of Geobacter Sulfurreducens.

While the exact process in which a cell will reduce an extracellular acceptor will vary from species to species, methods have been shown to involve the use of an oxidoreductase pathway that will transport electrons to the cell membrane that is exposed to the external environment. This pathway splits off from the ETC pathway after the cytochrome bc1 complex (Complex III) is oxidized by c-type cytochromes designed to move electrons towards the extracellular face of its outermost membrane instead of towards cytochrome c oxidase (Complex IV). MtrC and OmcA are examples of such c-type cytochromes that are endogenously found in the outer membrane of Shewanella oneidensis MR-1 a gammaproteobacterium, though many other variations exist (Figure 1).

Aside from releasing electrons to an exogenous final electron acceptor, external electron transfer may serve other purposes. First, cells may transfer electrons directly to each other without the need for an intermediary substance. Pelotomaculum thermopropioncum has been observed linked to Methanothermobacter thermautotrophicus by a pilus (external cell structures used in conjugation and adhesion) that was determined to be electrically conductive. Second, extracellular electrons may serve a role in the communication as a quorum signal in biofilms.

In addition to S. oneidensis MR-1, exoelectrogenic activity has been observed in the following strains of bacteria without an exogenous mediator: Shewanella putrefaciens IR-1, Clostridium butyricum, Desulfuromonas acetoxidans, Geobacter metallireducens, Geobacter sulfurreducens, Rhodoferax ferrireducens, Aeromonas hydrophilia (A3), Pseudomonas aeruginosa, Desulfobulbus propionicus, Geopsychrobacter electrodiphilus, Geothrix fermentans, Shewanella oneidensis DSP10, Escherichia coli, Rhodopseudomonas palustris, Brucella anthropi YZ-1, Desulfovibrio desulfuricans, Acidiphilium sp.3.2Sup5, Klebsiella pneumoniae L17, Thermincola sp.strain JR, Pichia anomala.

== Extracellular electron transport mechanisms ==
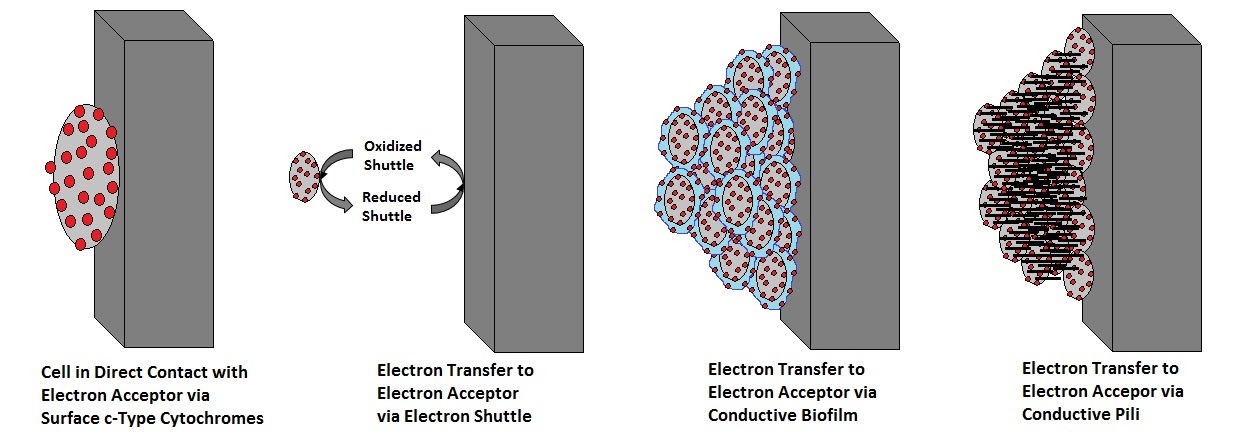
Figure 2. Proposed methods of exoelectrogen electron transport: Direct Transfer, Transfer through Electron Shuttle, Transfer through Conductive Biofilm, Transfer through Conductive Pili.

Reduced oxidoreductase enzymes at the extracellular membrane have been shown to use the following methods in transferring their electrons to the exogenous final acceptor: direct contact, shuttling via excreted mediators, iron chelating agents, through a conductive biofilm, and through conductive pili (Figure 2). However, the possibility exists that these methods are not mutually exclusive, and the method used may depend on environmental conditions. Under low microbial population densities, usage of electron shuttles and chelators synthesized by the exoelectrogen may be energetically costly due to insufficient concentrations of such molecules required for recovery and reuse. Under these circumstances, direct transfer would be favored; however, energy benefits would outweigh energy demands when the microbial community is of sufficient size.

Direct reduction of an exogenous acceptor is achieved through contact between the cell’s oxidoreductases and the terminal electron acceptor (i.e. an electrode or external metal compound). While these proteins are diverse (taking on both membrane-bound or soluble forms), their common locations in the outer membrane or periplasm in Gram-negative and Gram-positive bacteria provide intimate contact for electron transfer.

Additionally, the presence of electron shuttles dramatically increases the direct transfer rate. As an example in Shewanella oneidensis MR-1, transport is characterized through a series of redox and structural proteins extending from the cytoplasmic membrane to the outer cell surface (similar to Figure 1). Flavins are secreted which are thought to bridge the “gap” between cell surface protein(s) and the external metal, which may alleviate the need for immediate contact and facilitate transfer at a distance. Furthermore, since cytochromes generally recognize specific surfaces on the substrate metal, soluble flavins may act as a universal bridge allowing for electron donation to a variety of different metal shapes and sizes, which may be useful in microbial fuel cell applications. Flavins have also been hypothesized to bind to terminal electron transfer proteins as co-factors to increase oxidation rates.

In the case of Geobacter sulferreducens, the electron carrier riboflavin is used; however, the electron carrier is not entirely freely soluble and can be loosely bound in the culture's biofilm, resulting in a highly conductive biofilm. Furthermore, G. sulferreducens produces electrically conductive pili (nanowires) with OmcS oxidoreductase enzymes embedded on its surface, demonstrating the usage of multiple exoelectrogenic transfer methods.

In iron chelation, insoluble ferric oxide compounds are solubilized in aqueous solutions. As bioavailability of iron is scarce, many microbes secrete iron chelating compounds to solubilize, uptake, and sequester iron for various cellular processes. Certain exoelectrogens have shown capability of using such compounds for electron transport by solubilizing iron extracellularly, and delivering it to the cell surface or within the cell. The components used in each pathway are phylogenetically diverse, thus some chelating agents may reduce iron outside the cell acting as electron shuttles, while others may deliver iron to the cell for membrane bound reduction.

== See also ==
- Electric bacteria
- Cable bacteria
