= Geobacter uraniireducens =

Scientific classification
- Domain: Bacteria
- Kingdom: Pseudomonadati
- Phylum: Thermodesulfobacteriota
- Class: Desulfuromonadia
- Order: Geobacterales
- Family: Geobacteraceae
- Genus: Geobacter
- Species: G. uraniireducens

Binomial name
- Geobacter uraniireducens Shelobolina et al. 2008

Type strain
- ATCC BAA-1134, JCM 13001, Rf4

Synonyms
- Geotalea uraniireducens (Shelobolina et al. 2008) Waite et al. 2020

Species of bacterium capable of reducing uranium

Geobacter uraniireducens (more recently known as Geotalea uraniireducens) is a gram-negative, rod-shaped, anaerobic, chemolithotrophic, mesophilic, and motile bacterium from the genus of Geobacter. G. uraniireducens has been found to reduce iron and uranium in sediment and soil. It is being studied for use in bioremediation projects due to its ability to reduce uranium and arsenic.

== History ==
Geobacter uraniireducens was isolated from the subsurface sediment of a previous uranium ore processing facility undergoing uranium bioremediation in 2002. This occurred during a field study by Robert Anderson and his associates at the Old Rifle in situ test plot area in Rifle, Colorado. Shelobolina et al. (2008) further described the strain Rf4^{T} While Geobacter uraniireducens is the basonym, David Waite and associates reclassified it to the current preferred name, Geotalea uraniireducens in their 2020 paper.

== Characteristics ==
Geobacter uraniireducens are gram negative bacteria that are motile rods with rounded ends and two to four long lateral flagellum, as well as pili and vesicles.

=== Extracellular electron transport strategies ===
The strategy of G. uraniireducens for extracellular electron transport (EET) is to facilitate iron (Fe(III)) oxide reduction via the production of a soluble electron shuttle. It has been found that riboflavin mediates EET to reduce extracellular electron acceptors. This is important because unlike in most Geobacter species, where conductive pili are critical for effective reduction of extracellular electron acceptors, the pili of G. uraniireducens are not conductive.

== Metabolic mechanisms ==
Geobacter uraniireducens is an iron-reducing bacteria that uses acetate as an electron donor and reduces uranium (U(VI)). In addition to Fe(III), it is also able to use Mn(IV), anthraquinone-2,6-disulfonate, malate and fumarate as electron acceptors. As it uses Fe(III) oxide as the electron acceptor, it can oxidize acetate, lactate, pyruvate and ethanol as electron donors.

== Applications ==
=== Bioremediation ===
Geobacter uraniireducens have been used in bioremediation studies in situ to decontaminate groundwater containing high levels of uranium from previous activities. This process can be enhanced by using acetate to stimulate increased populations.

=== Environmental implications ===
One environmental implication of interest in G. uraniireducens is its arsenic (As(V)) reducing capabilities in subsurface sediments. This ability is proposed to be due to gene encoding for respiratory arsenate reductase.
