= Geobacter lovleyi =

Scientific classification
- Domain: Bacteria
- Kingdom: Pseudomonadati
- Phylum: Thermodesulfobacteriota
- Class: Desulfuromonadia
- Order: Geobacterales
- Family: Geobacteraceae
- Genus: Geobacter
- Species: G. lovleyi

Binomial name
- Geobacter lovleyi Sung et al. 2009

Synonyms
- Trichlorobacter lovleyi (Sung et al. 2009) Waite et al. 2020

Species of bacterium

Geobacter lovleyi is a gram-negative metal-reducing and tetrachloroethene-dechlorinating proteobacterium. It has potential as a bioremediation organism, and is actively researched as such.
