= Geobacter psychrophilus =

Scientific classification
- Domain: Bacteria
- Kingdom: Pseudomonadati
- Phylum: Thermodesulfobacteriota
- Class: Desulfuromonadia
- Order: Geobacterales
- Family: Geobacteraceae
- Genus: Geobacter
- Species: G. psychrophilus

Binomial name
- Geobacter psychrophilus Nevin et al. 2005

Synonyms
- Citrifermentans pelophilus (Straub & Buchholz-Cleven 2001) Waite et al. 2020; Geoanaerobacter pelophilus (Straub & Buchholz-Cleven 2001) Xu et al. 2022; Geomonas pelophila (Straub & Buchholz-Cleven 2001) Xu et al. 2020

Species of bacterium

Geobacter psychrophilus is a Fe(III)-reducing bacterium. It is Gram-negative, slightly curved, rod-shaped and motile via means of monotrichous flagella. Its type strain is P35^{T} (=ATCC BAA-1013^{T} =DSM 16674^{T} =JCM 12644^{T}).
