= Dissimilatory metal-reducing microorganisms =

Anaerobic microorganisms using a metal as terminal electron acceptor to respirate

Dissimilatory metal-reducing microorganisms are a group of microorganisms (both bacteria and archaea) that can perform anaerobic respiration utilizing a metal as terminal electron acceptor rather than molecular oxygen (O_{2}), which is the terminal electron acceptor reduced to water (H_{2}O) in aerobic respiration. The most common metals used for this end are iron [Fe(III)] and manganese [Mn(IV)], which are reduced to Fe(II) and Mn(II) respectively, and most microorganisms that reduce Fe(III) can reduce Mn(IV) as well. But other metals and metalloids are also used as terminal electron acceptors, such as vanadium [V(V)], chromium [Cr(VI)], molybdenum [Mo(VI)], cobalt [Co(III)], palladium [Pd(II)], gold [Au(III)], and mercury [Hg(II)].

== Conditions and mechanisms for dissimilatory metal reduction ==
Dissimilatory metal reducers are a diverse group of microorganisms, which is reflected in the factors that affect the different forms of metal reduction. The process of dissimilatory metal reduction occurs in the absence of oxygen (O_{2}), but dissimilatory metal reducers include both obligate (strict) anaerobes, such as the family Geobacteraceae, and facultative anaerobes, such as Shewanella spp. As well, across the dissimilatory metal reducers species, various electron donors are used in the oxidative reaction that is coupled to metal reduction. For instance, some species are limited to small organic acids and hydrogen (H_{2}), whereas others may oxidize aromatic compounds. In certain instances, such as Cr(VI) reduction, the use of small organic compounds can optimize the rate of metal reduction. Another factor that influences metal respiration is environmental acidity. Although acidophilic and alkaliphilic dissimilatory metal reducers exist, the neutrophilic metal reducers group contains the most well-characterized genera. In soil and sediment environments, where the pH is often neutral, metals like iron are found in their solid oxidized forms, and exhibit variable reduction potential, which can affect their use by microorganisms.

Due to the impermeability of the cell wall to minerals and the insolubility of metal oxides, dissimilatory metal reducers have developed ways to reduce metals extracellularly via electron transfer. Cytochromes c, which are transmembrane proteins, play an important role in transporting electrons from the cytosol to enzymes attached to the outside of the cell. The electrons are then further transported to the terminal electron acceptor via direct interaction between the enzymes and the metal oxide. In addition to establishing direct contact, dissimilatory metal reducers also display the ability to perform ranged metal reduction. For instance, some species of dissimilatory metal reducers produce compounds that can dissolve insoluble minerals or act as electron shuttles, enabling them to perform metal reduction from a distance. Other organic compounds frequently found in soils and sediments, such as humic acids, may also act as electron shuttles. In biofilms, nanowires and multistep electron hopping (in which electrons jump from cell to cell towards the mineral) have also been suggested as methods for reducing metals without requiring direct cell contact. It has been proposed that cytochromes c are involved in both of these mechanisms. In nanowires, for instance, cytochromes c function as the final component that transfers electrons to the metal oxide.

== Terminal electron acceptors ==
A wide range of Fe(III)-bearing minerals have been observed to function as terminal electron acceptors, including magnetite, hematite, goethite, lepidocrocite, ferrihydrite, hydrous ferric oxide, smectite, illite, jarosite, among others.

== Secondary mineral formation ==
In natural systems, secondary minerals may form as a byproduct of bacterial metal reduction. Commonly observed secondary minerals produced during experimental bio-reduction by dissimilatory metal reducers include magnetite, siderite, green rust, vivianite, and hydrous Fe(II)-carbonate.

== Genera that include dissimilatory metal reducers ==
- Albidiferax (Betaproteobacteria)
- Shewanella (Gammaproteobacteria)
- Geobacter (Deltaproteobacteria)
- Geothrix fermentans (Acidobacteria)
- Deferribacter (Deferribacteres)
- Thermoanaerobacter (Firmicutes)
