= Forest ring =

Patterns of low tree density in northern Canada

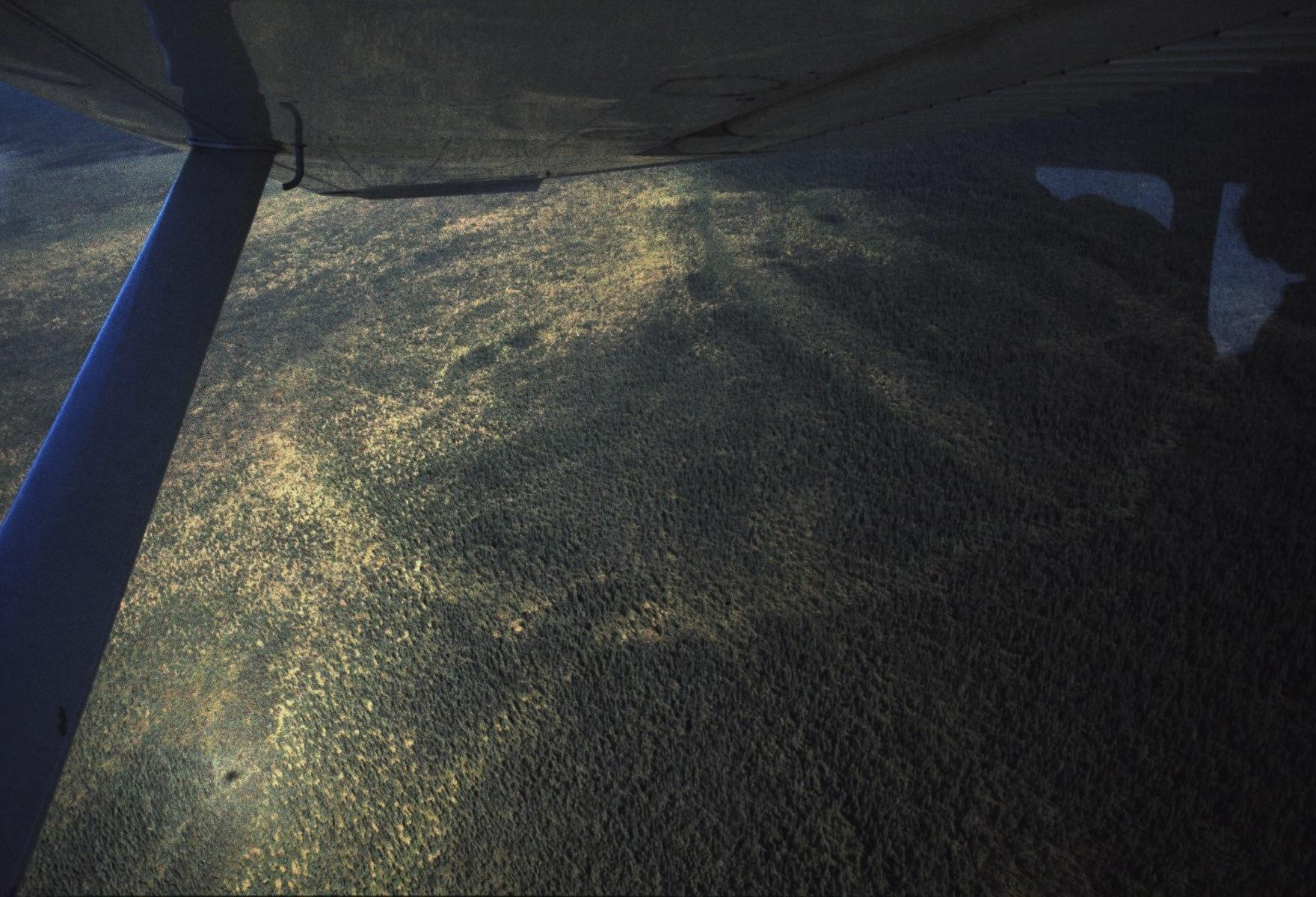
A forest ring from northern Ontario, near 50°30′28″N 84°59′30″W

Forest rings are large, circular patterns of low tree density in the boreal forests of northern Canada. These rings can range from 50 metres (160 ft) to nearly 2 kilometres (1.2 mi) in diameter, with rims about 20 metres (66 ft) in thickness. The origin of forest rings is not known, despite several mechanisms for their creation having been proposed. Such hypotheses include radially growing fungus, buried kimberlite pipes, trapped gas pockets, and meteorite impact craters.

== History ==
Because of their large scale, forest rings are not apparent from the ground, and it was not until aerial photography became a common surveying tool in the 1950s that geologists began to notice them. The term "forest ring" was coined by The Ontario Geological Survey to differentiate the phenomenon from fairy rings.

Geobacter spp. and methanotrophs, such as Candidatus Methylomirabilis and Methylobacter, were highly abundant in samples from the 'Bean' and the 'Thorn North' ring, in Ontario, Canada.

== Hypothesis ==
Forest rings were originally thought to be caused by the radial growth of fungi within the root system of black spruce (Picea mariana), possibly the fungus Armillaria ostoyae. A ring would begin as a single point of infection and grow outward in all directions. Affected trees would die in the interior of the circle, and eventually new trees would grow in their place. The fungal mat would become ring-shaped and visible from above as a circular ring of stunted trees. The fungal hypothesis is no longer favoured as there is little compelling evidence to support it. Observations of forest rings in the Abitibi region of Quebec have found no evidence of mass tree mortality by a pathogen.

It was further hypothesized that bacteria, such as Geobacter, might be contributing to the ring formation. Their capability to form conducting nanowires or pili and to perform directional electron transport might contribute to a circular charge transfer from the electron-rich center of the ring towards the ring edges. The so-catalyzed oxidation processes increase acidity and dissolve carbonates, thus creating a depression, and, accordingly, the ring edge. Recent microbiological investigations indeed show a high abundance of Geobacter at the ring edge.

== Outside of Canada ==
Forest rings have also been reported in Russia and Australia.

== See also ==
- Geobacter
- Fairy ring – Naturally occurring ring or arc of mushrooms
- Fairy circle — circular patches of barren land found in grasslands of the Namib desert and Australia
