= GS-15 =

GS-15 may refer to:

- General Schedule (US civil service pay scale)
- Geobacter
