= Electric bacteria =

Bacteria deriving energy directly from electrons

Electric bacteria are forms of exoelectrogenic bacteria that directly consume and excrete electrons at different energy potentials without requiring the metabolization of any sugars or other nutrients. This form of life appears to be especially adapted to low-oxygen environments. Many life forms require an oxygen environment in which to release the excess of electrons which are produced in metabolizing sugars. In a low oxygen environment, this pathway for releasing electrons is not available. Instead, electric bacteria "breathe" metals instead of oxygen, which effectively results in both an intake of and excretion of electrical charges.

Some electric bacteria:

- Shewanella, which makes protein nanowires
- Geobacter, which makes protein nanowires out of pilin
- Methanobacterium palustre
- Methanococcus maripaludis
- Mycobacterium smegmatis
- Modified Escherichia coli (with Geobacter nanowire genes)
- A broad collection of 30 bacteria varieties from marine sediments

== See also ==
- Cable bacteria
- Electron transfer
- Electron transfer chain
