= Paraburkholderia fungorum =

Scientific classification
- Domain: Bacteria
- Kingdom: Pseudomonadati
- Phylum: Pseudomonadota
- Class: Betaproteobacteria
- Order: Burkholderiales
- Family: Burkholderiaceae
- Genus: Paraburkholderia
- Species: P. fungorum

Binomial name
- Paraburkholderia fungorum (Coenye et al. 2001) Sawana et al. 2015

Type strain
- CCUG 31961; CIP 107096; Croize P763-2; DSM 17061; JCM 21562; LMG 16225; NBRC 102489

Synonyms
- Burkholderia fungorum Coenye et al. 2001; Burkholderia insulsa Rusch et al. 2015; Paraburkholderia insulsa (Rusch et al. 2015) Dobritsa and Samadpour 2016

Species of bacterium

Paraburkholderia fungorum is a Gram-negative species of bacteria. P. fungorum can be isolated from the environment and from humans, plants, and animals. It has been commonly used as a beneficial microorganism in agriculture as an agent for biocontrol and bioremediation. Some strains can use uranium for their growth and convert U(VI) to U(IV).

P. fungorum isolated from the tissue of an infected Malayan pangolin (Manis javanica) was found to have a genomic size of approximately 7.7 Mbps with an N50 of 69,666 bps. It also shared some common virulence genes with the known pathogenic species of Burkholderia.

== See also ==
- Shewanella putrefaciens
- Geobacter metallireducens
