= Sinirhodobacter hungdaonensis =

Scientific classification
- Domain: Bacteria
- Kingdom: Pseudomonadati
- Phylum: Pseudomonadota
- Class: Alphaproteobacteria
- Order: Rhodobacterales
- Family: Rhodobacteraceae
- Genus: Sinirhodobacter
- Species: S. hungdaonensis

Binomial name
- Sinirhodobacter hungdaonensis corrig. Xi et al. 2019

Type strain
- L3, CGMCC 1.12963T, KCTC 42823

Species of bacterium

Sinirhodobacter hungdaonensis is a bacterium from the genus of Sinirhodobacter which has been isolated from activated sludge from a wastewater treatment plant in Huangdao in China.
