= OmcS oxidoreductase =

OmcS nanowires (Geobacter nanowires) are conductive filaments found in some species of bacteria, including Geobacter sulfurreducens, where they catalyze the transfer of electrons. They are multiheme c-Type cytochromes localized outside of the cell of some exoelectrogenic bacterial species, serving as mediator of extracellular electron transfer from cells to Fe(III) oxides and other extracellular electron acceptors.

OmcS (3D structure) has a core of six low-spin bis-histidinyl hexacoordinated heme groups inside a sinusoidal filament ~5-7.4 nm in diameter, with 46.7 Å rise per subunit and 4.3 subunits per turn. A heme packing motif in OmcS identical to that seen in a ~3 nm diameter cytochrome nanowire based on the four-heme OmcE subunit (3D structure), even though OmcE and OmcS share no sequence similarity.

The OmcS gene can be one the most highly up-regulated genes in the Geobacter sulfurreducens KN400 strain when cultivated in a microbial fuel cell, as compared to the PCA strain, although a role for OmcS in electron transfer to electrodes has never been demonstrated.
