= Sinirhodobacter =

Scientific classification
- Domain: Bacteria
- Kingdom: Pseudomonadati
- Phylum: Pseudomonadota
- Class: Alphaproteobacteria
- Order: Rhodobacterales
- Family: Rhodobacteraceae
- Genus: Sinirhodobacter corrig. Yang et al. 2018

Species
- S. ferrireducens corrig. Yang et al. 2018; S. hankyongi Lee et al. 2020; S. hungdaonensis corrig. Xi et al. 2019; S. populi corrig. Xu et al. 2019

Synonyms
- Sinorhodobacter Yang et al. 2018

Genus of bacteria

Sinorhodobacter is a genus of bacteria from the family of Rhodobacteraceae.
