= Shewanella algae =

Scientific classification
- Domain: Bacteria
- Kingdom: Pseudomonadati
- Phylum: Pseudomonadota
- Class: Gammaproteobacteria
- Order: Alteromonadales
- Family: Shewanellaceae
- Genus: Shewanella
- Species: S. algae

Binomial name
- Shewanella algae Simidu et al. 1990

Species of bacterium

Shewanella algae is a rod-shaped Gram-negative marine bacterium.

== Description ==
Shewanella algae cells are rod-shaped and straight. They can grow on Salmonella-Shigella agar and form yellow-orange or brown colonies. They produce the toxin tetrodotoxin and can infect humans.

=== Shewanella algae found in humans ===
Shewanella algae is found naturally in wildlife such as certain marine environments but can also exist as a pathogen in humans where they live in soft tissue and produce hemolytic substance or exotoxins. Humans with Shewanella algae in their system can be immunocompromised. The ingestion of this algae through raw seafood can cause it to grow in one's soft tissue and develop these neurotoxins which, if left untreated, can cause infections or disease. Among the several dozen strains of Shewanella Algae, it is found that S. alga is the most commonly found strain in human illnesses.

== Metabolism ==
Shewanella algae is a facultative anaerobe with the ability to reduce iron, uranium and plutonium metabolically. When no oxygen is available, it can use metal cations as the terminal electron acceptor in the electron transport chain.

Shewanella algae is of great interest to the United States Department of Energy because of its ability to reduce the amount of radioactive waste in groundwater by making it less soluble. An example would be:

$\begin{array}{lcr} C_6H_{12}O_6 + 12 U^{6+} + 6H_2O +24 e^- \longrightarrow& 6CO_2 + 12 U^{4+} + 24H^+ \\ \qquad Water\ Soluble & Water\ Insoluble \end{array}$
