= Geobacter metallireducens =

Scientific classification
- Domain: Bacteria
- Kingdom: Pseudomonadati
- Phylum: Thermodesulfobacteriota
- Class: Desulfuromonadia
- Order: Geobacterales
- Family: Geobacteraceae
- Genus: Geobacter
- Species: G. metallireducens

Binomial name
- Geobacter metallireducens Lovley et al. 1995

Species of bacterium

Geobacter metallireducens is a gram-negative metal-reducing proteobacterium. It is a strict anaerobe that oxidizes several short-chain fatty acids, alcohols, and monoaromatic compounds with Fe(III) as the sole electron acceptor. It can also use uranium for its growth and convert U(VI) to U(IV).

Geobacter metallireducens was discovered by Derek Lovley at UMass Amherst in 1993. It is an iron-reducing bacteria and it has been thought that the microbe could be used to treat industrial sites where "cyanide-metal complexes" have formed to contaminate the site.

The genome of Geobacter metallireducens has a chromosome length of 3,997,420 bp. It has a circular bacterial chromosome, meaning there are no free ends of DNA. The shape is roughly like that of an egg. Geobacter metallireducens also has a GC content of 59.51%. The plasmid has a lower GC content, of 52.48%, and is 13,762 bp in length. The plasmid encodes a stabilizing protein, RelE/ParE, which allows Geobacter metallireducens to adapt and thrive in different and new environmental conditions.

Geobacter metallireducens becomes motile when necessary, producing a flagellum in order to relocate when environmental conditions become unfavorable. Insoluble Fe(III) and Mn(IV) are electron acceptors for many chemolithotrophic microorganisms. Fe (II) is produced through the reduction of Fe(III) and Mn (IV) oxides. It is often difficult for these organisms to attain iron and manganese because Fe(III) and Mn (IV) oxides do not freely diffuse through bacterial membranes. Geobacter metallireducens has evolved a unique way to access iron via insoluble Fe(III) and Mn (IV) oxides; they grow motility appendages to help them find and contact the insoluble oxides. According to a study conducted by Childers et al., cells of G. metallireducens that grew in an environment with insoluble Fe(III) and Mn (IV) oxides grew flagella and pili. Whereas those grown in environments with soluble Fe(III) and Mn (IV) oxides did not have flagella nor pili. G. metallireducens is only motile when there are no soluble Fe(III) and Mn (IV) oxides in its environment to act as the electron acceptor. It is the first known microorganism to display chemotactic tendencies towards iron and manganese, as well as the first microbe discovered that oxidizes organic compounds with the inorganic elements iron and manganese.

G. metallireducens does not solely reduce Fe(III) and Mn(IV) oxides, it can reduce a variety of compounds including those that are toxic or radioactive such as uranium, plutonium, technetium, and vanadium. Vanadium, specifically, can contaminate groundwater in areas near high mining activity. G. metallireducens can utilize vanadium (V) as an energy source by reducing the metal to vanadium (IV). Therefore, the bacteria can be used to aid in decontamination of affected groundwaters.

In a 2006 study, Wiatrowski et al. discovered that G. metallireducens strain GS-15 is capable of reducing ionic mercury (Hg(II)) to elemental mercury (Hg(0)). This microbial reduction occurs under anaerobic conditions as part of the bacterium's respiratory metabolism, in which metals serve as terminal electron acceptors. The transformation of Hg(II), a toxic and bioavailable form of mercury, into volatile Hg(0) has important environmental implications. Elemental mercury is less reactive and can volatilize into the atmosphere, potentially decreasing the local toxicity of mercury-contaminated environments.

In 2002, a pilot field test was conducted to examine the efficacy of using G. metallireducens to decontaminate a former vanadium and uranium ore processing site in Rifle, Colorado. Due to the leaching of tailing piles, vanadium(V) groundwater concentrations up to 50 μM were found near the site. Acetate was used as an electron donor and pumped into the groundwater aquifer for 50 days. Test wells downgradient of the injection site showed a decline in vanadium(V) levels within 9 days and either undetectable levels or levels below the human health risk-based concentration (6 μM) within 39 days. Wells upgradient of the acetate injection did not see a significant change. In this same time period, a significant increase in the proportion of bacteria from the Geobacteraceae family was observed, lending strong evidence for the biotic precipitation of vanadium(V) out of the groundwater by G. metallireducens.

G. metallireducens can use a similar mechanism to reduce uranium (VI) to uranium (IV) in contaminated groundwaters. However, there is still research to be done on making this process more effective.

G. metallireducens has been demonstrated to reduce chloramphenicol (CAP) to complete dechlorination products under pure culture conditions. Research utilizing cyclic voltammograms and chronoamperometry revealed that the bacteria exhibited a negative correlation CAP removal efficiency with initial CAP dosages, displaying the organism's potential application of bioremediation in environments polluted by antibiotics.

G. metallireducens can make electrical connections with other microbes. This, in turn, allows other microbes to perform anaerobic syntrophic metabolism of organic substrates. This process of this electrical connection is called direct interspecies electron transfer (DIET). DIET is a metabolism that is defined by the movement of free electrons, rather than organisms only receiving electrons via the reduction of other compounds. The pili of G. metallireducens conduct electrical currents. They can transfer electrons to other Geobacter species as well as archaea, specifically methanogens. The DIET connection to methanogens allows these bacteria to contribute to the methane cycle, and convert organic wastes to methane.

A study by Zhou et al. demonstrated that Geobacter metallireducens is capable of participating in direct interspecies electron transfer (DIET) with Methanothrix thermoacetophila (formerly referred to as Methanothrix thermoacidophila). This cooperative interaction was shown to enhance methane production by M. thermoacetophila via acetate dismutation. The electron transfer process was facilitated by the OmaF-OmbF-OmcF porin complex and an octaheme outer membrane c-type cytochrome encoded by the gene Gmet_0930.

Additionally, the study found that the expression of gas vesicle genes in M. thermoacetophila was significantly downregulated during DIET compared to cells grown solely on acetate. This reduced expression is hypothesized to improve physical contact between membrane-associated redox proteins, thereby optimizing electron transfer during the syntrophic interaction.

== See also ==
- Shewanella putrefaciens
- Paraburkholderia fungorum
