= Geobacter sulfurreducens =

- A transmission electron micrograph of Geobacter sulfurreducens cells Credit: Anna Klimes and Ernie Carbone, UMass Amherst

Scientific classification
- Domain: Bacteria
- Kingdom: Pseudomonadati
- Phylum: Thermodesulfobacteriota
- Class: Desulfuromonadia
- Order: Geobacterales
- Family: Geobacteraceae
- Genus: Geobacter
- Species: G. sulfurreducens

Binomial name
- Geobacter sulfurreducens Caccavo et al., 1994

Subspecies
- Geobacter sulfurreducens subsp. ethanolicus; Geobacter sulfurreducens subsp. sulfurreducens

Species of bacterium

Geobacter sulfurreducens is a gram-negative metal- and sulphur-reducing proteobacterium. It is rod-shaped, aerotolerant anaerobe, non-fermentative, has flagellum and type four pili, and is closely related to Geobacter metallireducens. Geobacter sulfurreducens is an anaerobic species of bacteria that comes from the family of bacteria called Geobacteraceae. Under the genus of Geobacter, G. sulfurreducens is one out of twenty different species. The Geobacter genus was discovered by Derek R. Lovley in 1987. G. sulfurreducens was first isolated in Norman, Oklahoma, USA from materials found around the surface of a contaminated ditch.

== Characteristics ==
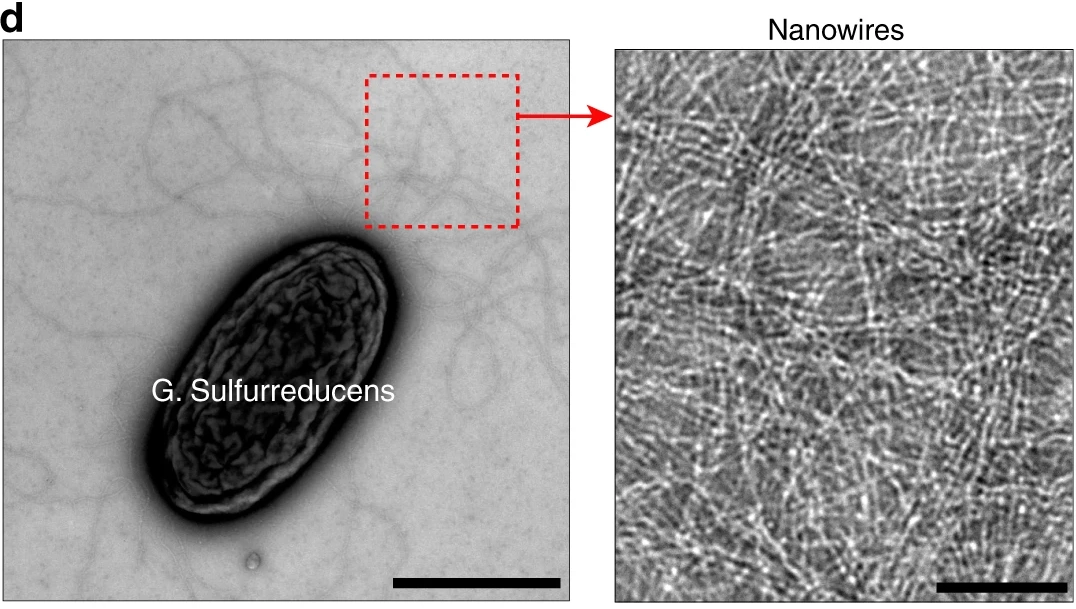
Geobacter sulfurreducens and its bacterial nanowires

Geobacter sulfurreducens is a rod-shaped microbe with a gram-negative cell wall. Geobacter is known as a type of bacteria that is able to conduct levels of electricity, and the species G. sulfurreducens is also known as "electricigens" due to their ability to create an electric current and produce electricity. A study by Daniel Bond and Derek Lovley in 2003 showed that because of G. sulfurreducens' ability to conduct electricity, there was a possibility of creating an effective and long lasting microbial fuel cell (MFC). This study proved successful, as it was found that because G. sulfurreducens cells are successful at conducting electricity and changing electrons into electricity, it was also found that this made it possible to have electricity conducted for long periods of time. Due to these findings, organizations such as the World Bank have been heavily funding projects in countries such as Tanzania and Namibia in which they work to harness G. sulfurreducens to run on waste products in order to have electricity for lights and for the charging of batteries.

Geobacter sulfurreducens could be useful in bioremediation of uranium-contaminated groundwater.

== Genome ==
Geobacter sulfurreducens consists of a genome with one single circular chromosome and that single chromosome contains 3,814,139 base pairs (bp). The fact that this microbe has a circular chromosome is a further indication that it is a normal prokaryote, identified as a bacterium. It is predicted that G. sulfurreducens contains 3466 coding sequences, with the average size of these coding sequences being 989 base pairs. The microbe contains a high number of c-type cytochromes, which are utilized for electron transport proteins. There is a hypothesis that due to its genomic make up, G. sulfurreducens is able to identify surfaces and can construct biofilms that are able to conduct electricity by utilizing its ability to transport electrons.

Overall, the genomic make up of G. sulfurreducens appears to support the current understanding of the ways in which the microbe is able to metabolize easily and transport electrons. An interesting part of the microbe's genomic makeup, is that it is missing an enzyme called formyltetrahydrofolate synthetase, also referred to as FTS. This is relevant, because FTS is utilized to help the metabolic process – Which is a key function of G. sulfurreducens. Because FTS is an enzyme that is missing, G. sulfurreducens instead utilizes the reverse electron transport process and completely ignores the missing FTS enzyme.

== See also ==
- Bacterial nanowires#Implications and potential applications
