= Ontario Geological Survey =

The Ontario Geological Survey (OGS) is an administrative Branch of the Ontario Ministry of Energy and Mines. It is responsible for documenting and communicating the Geology of Ontario, the Ontario Assessment File Database (OAFD), the Ontario Drill Hole Database (ODHD), the Ontario Mineral Inventory Database (OMI), the OGS Publications Database (PUB) as well as many other geological publications that describe the geology of Ontario.

OGS helps people understand how to apply the geological knowledge about Ontario to address a range of public policy issues. The OGS is a public good organization. Its geological survey function is mandated by the Ontario Government. Ontario's geology includes: a) the rock (bedrock); b) the deposits of sand, gravel, and till left by the glaciers; c) the mineral resources and potential; d) the energy resource potential within the rocks and soils; and e) the groundwater aquifers that contain groundwater resources. An understanding of what is at, and below, our feet is fundamental to human existence on the Earth, to understand the environment and habitats, and our ability to adapt to future changes, such as global warming. This geological knowledge is used to assess Earth resource potential, to attract investment, to ensure the health and safety of Ontario people from geo-hazards, and to plan the present and future use of the land. The OGS also collaborates with Ontario's Aboriginal people to achieve a mutual understanding, mutual respect, and to achieve mutual interests. The OGS is a science-based organization that conducts field studies.

To facilitate use of geological information by a range of technical and non-technical users, OGS provides many of Ontario's key, regional, geological databases for easy viewing on Google Earth, but using the OGSEarth function. Themes include: bedrock geology, surficial geology, mineral resource data, groundwater aquifer data, geophysical and geochemical data, bedrock topography and overburden thickness, plus many more themes.
