= Sinirhodobacter ferrireducens =

Scientific classification
- Domain: Bacteria
- Kingdom: Pseudomonadati
- Phylum: Pseudomonadota
- Class: Alphaproteobacteria
- Order: Rhodobacterales
- Family: Rhodobacteraceae
- Genus: Sinirhodobacter
- Species: S. ferrireducens

Binomial name
- Sinirhodobacter ferrireducens corrig. Yang et al. 2018

Type strain
- CCTCC AB2012026, KACC 16603, SgZ-3

Synonyms
- Sinorhodobacter ferrireducens Yang et al. 2018

Species of bacterium

Sinirhodobacter ferrireducens is a Gram-negative, facultative anaerobic and Fe(III) oxide-reducing bacterium from the genus Sinirhodobacter.
