= Bacterial nanowires =

Electrically conductive appendages produced by a number of bacteria

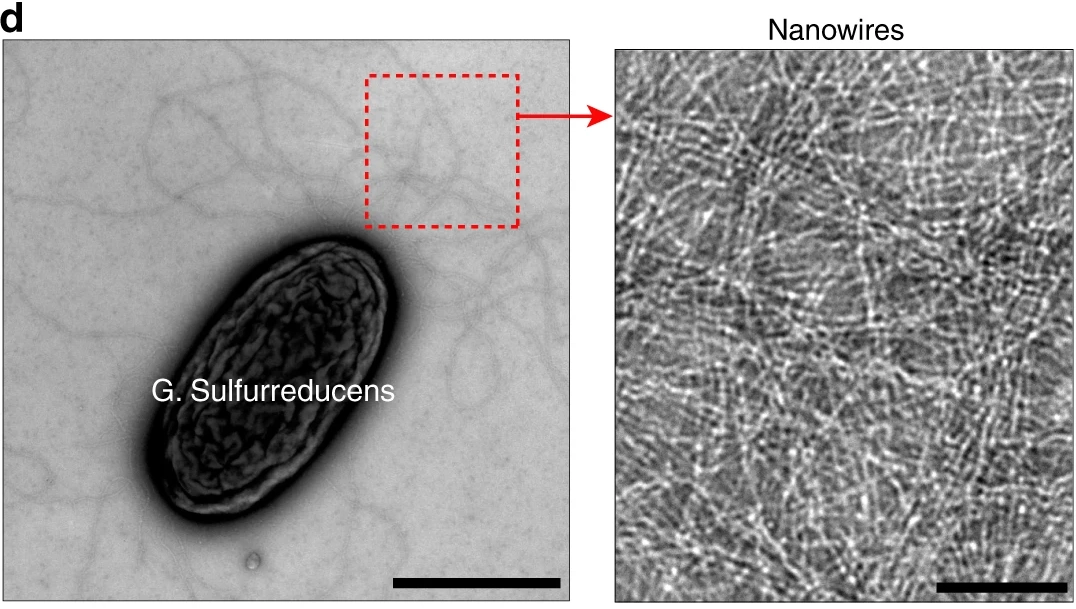
Geobacter sulfurreducens and its nanowires

Bacterial nanowires (also known as microbial nanowires) are electrically conductive appendages produced by a number of bacteria most notably from the Geobacter and Shewanella genera. Conductive nanowires have also been reported in the oxygenic cyanobacterium Synechocystis PCC6803 and a thermophilic, methanogenic coculture consisting of Pelotomaculum thermopropionicum and Methanothermobacter thermoautotrophicus, but the identity of these proteins remains unknown. From physiological and functional perspectives, bacterial nanowires are diverse. The precise role microbial nanowires play in their biological systems has not been fully realized, but several proposed functions exist. Outside of a naturally occurring environment, bacterial nanowires have shown potential to be useful in several fields, notably the bioenergy and bioremediation industries.

== Physiology ==
Geobacter nanowires were originally thought to be modified pili, which are used to establish connections to terminal electron acceptors during some types of anaerobic respiration. Further research has shown that Geobacter nanowires are composed of stacked cytochromes, namely OmcS, OmcE or OmcZ. Despite being physiologically distinct from pili, bacterial nanowires are often described as pili anyway due to the initial misconception upon their discovery. These stacked cytochrome nanowires form a seamless array of hemes which stabilize the nanowire via pi-stacking and provide a path for electron transport. Species of the genus Geobacter use nanowires to transfer electrons to extracellular electron acceptors (such as Fe(III) oxides and electrodes). This function was discovered through the examination of mutants, where deletions causing loss of the nanowires led to defects in growth with Fe(III) oxide minerals or electrodes.

Shewanella nanowires are also not pili, but are instead extensions of the outer membrane that contain a complex consisting of a large pore that links the outer membrane decaheme outer membrane cytochromes MtrC to periplasmic MtrA. The density of outer membrane cytochromes, and lack of conductivity in nanowires from the MtrC-deficient mutant directly support a proposed multistep hopping mechanism for electron transport along Shewanella nanowires.

Additionally, nanowires can facilitate long-range electron transfer across thick biofilm layers. By connecting to other cells around them, nanowires allow bacteria located many microns from a conductive electron acceptor to still use that surface as their terminal electron acceptor.

== History ==
The concept of electromicrobiology has been around since the early 1900s when a series of discoveries found cells capable of producing electricity. It was demonstrated for the first time in 1911 by Michael Cressé Potter that cells could convert chemical energy to electrical energy. It wasn't until 1988 that extracellular electron transport (EET) was observed for the first time with the independent discoveries of Geobacter and Shewanella bacteria and their respective nanowires. Since their discoveries, other nanowire containing microbes have been identified, but they remain the most intensively studied. In 1998, EET was observed in a microbial fuel cell setting for the first time using Shewanella bacteria to reduce an Fe(III) electrode. In 2010, bacterial nanowires were shown to have facilitated the flow of electricity into Sporomusa bacteria. This was the first observed instance of EET used to draw electrons from the environment into a cell. Research persists to date to explore the mechanisms, implications, and potential applications of nanowires and the biological systems they are a part of.

== Implications and potential applications ==
=== Biological implications ===
Microorganisms have shown to use nanowires to facilitate the use of extracellular metals as terminal electron acceptors in an electron transport chain. The high reduction potential of the metals receiving electrons is capable of driving a considerable ATP production. Aside from that, the extent of the implications brought on by the existence of bacterial nanowires is not fully realized. It has been speculated nanowires may function as conduits for electron transport between different members of a microbial community. This has potential to allow for regulatory feedback or other communication between members of the same or even different microbial species. Some organisms are capable of both expelling and taking in electrons through nanowires. Those species would likely be able to oxidize extracellular metals by using them as an electron or energy source to facilitate energy consuming cellular processes. Microbes also could potentially use nanowires to temporarily store electrons on metals. Building up an electron concentration on a metal anode would create a battery of sorts that the cells could later use to fuel metabolic activity. While these potential implications provide a reasonable hypothesis towards the role of the bacterial nanowire in a biological system, more research is needed to fully understand the extent of how cellular species benefit from nanowire use.

=== Bioenergy applications in microbial fuel cells ===
In microbial fuel cells (MFCs), bacterial nanowires generate electricity via extracellular electron transport to the MFC's anode. Nanowire networks have been shown to enhance the electricity output of MFCs with efficient and long-range conductivity. In particular, bacterial nanowires of Geobacter sulfurreducens possess metallic-like conductivity, producing electricity at levels comparable to those of synthetic metallic nanostructures. When bacterial strains are genetically manipulated to boost nanowire formation, higher electricity yields are generally observed. Coating the nanowires with metal oxides also further promotes electrical conductivity. Additionally, these nanowires can transport electrons up to centimeter-scale distances. Long-range electron transfer via microbial nanowire networks allows viable cells that are not in direct contact with an anode to contribute to electron flow.

To date, the currency produced by bacterial nanowires is very low. Across a biofilm 7 micrometers thick, a current density of around 17 microamperes per square centimeter and a voltage of around 0.5 volts was reported.

=== Other significant applications ===
Microbial nanowires of Shewanella and Geobacter have been shown to aid in bioremediation of uranium contaminated groundwater. To demonstrate this, scientists compared and observed the concentration of uranium removed by piliated and nonpiliated strains of Geobacter. Through a series of controlled experiments, they were able to deduce that nanowire present strains were more effective at the mineralization of uranium as compared to nanowire absent mutants.

Further significant application of bacterial nanowires can be seen in the bioelectronics industry. With sustainable resources in mind, scientists have proposed the future use of biofilms of Geobacter as a platform for functional under water transistors and supercapacitors, capable of self-renewing energy.

On 20 April 2020, researchers demonstrated a diffusive memristor fabricated from protein nanowires of the bacterium Geobacter sulfurreducens which functions at substantially lower voltages than the ones previously described and may allow the construction of artificial neurons which function at voltages of biological action potentials. Bacterial nanowires vary from traditionally utilized silicon nanowires by showing an increased degree of biocompatibility. More research is needed, but the memristors may eventually be used to directly process biosensing signals, for neuromorphic computing and/or direct communication with biological neurons.
