= Shewanella putrefaciens =

Scientific classification
- Domain: Bacteria
- Kingdom: Pseudomonadati
- Phylum: Pseudomonadota
- Class: Gammaproteobacteria
- Order: Alteromonadales
- Family: Shewanellaceae
- Genus: Shewanella
- Species: S. putrefaciens

Binomial name
- Shewanella putrefaciens (Lee et al. 1981); MacDonell and Colwell 1986

Synonyms
- Pseudomonas putrefaciens (Derby and Hammer 1931) Long and Hammer 1941; Achromobacter putrefaciens Derby and Hammer 1931; Alteromonas putrefaciens (ex Derby and Hammer 1931) Lee et al. 1981

Species of bacterium

Shewanella putrefaciens is a Gram-negative pleomorphic bacterium. It has been isolated from marine environments, as well as from anaerobic sandstone in the Morrison Formation in New Mexico. S. putrefaciens is also a facultative anaerobe with the ability to reduce iron and manganese metabolically; that is, it can use iron and manganese as the terminal electron acceptor in the electron transport chain (in contrast to obligate aerobes which must use oxygen for this purpose). It is also one of the organisms associated with the odor of rotting fish, as it is a marine organism which produces trimethylamine (hence the species name putrefaciens, from putrid).

In both solid and liquid media, S. putrefaciens is often recognizable by its bright pink color. On solid media, the colonies are round, fast-growing, and pink. The organism is also fast-growing in liquid media, and there will give the liquid an overall pink hue. On blood agar plates, the colonies are typically convex and large, with a brown pigment, and cause “greening” of the agar around the colonies. S. putrefaciens are non-lactose fermenters on MacConkey agar. As with all Shewanella, this organism produces hydrogen sulfide on TSI.

Although it is very rare for it to act as a human pathogen, there have been cases of infections and bacteremia caused by S. putrefaciens.

Shewanella putrefaciens is one of several species that have been shown to derive energy by reducing U(VI) to U(IV), which is thought to be important in making uranium deposits. In fact, strain CN32 is very metabolically versatile and is capable of reducing metals, metalloids, and even radionuclides in place of oxygen during anaerobic growth. This is known to include (but is not necessarily limited to) Fe(III)→Fe(II), Mn(IV)→(via Mn(III) intermediate)→Mn(II), V(V)→V(IV), Tc(VII)→Tc(V/IV) and U(VI)→U(IV).

== See also ==
- Geobacter metallireducens
- Paraburkholderia fungorum
