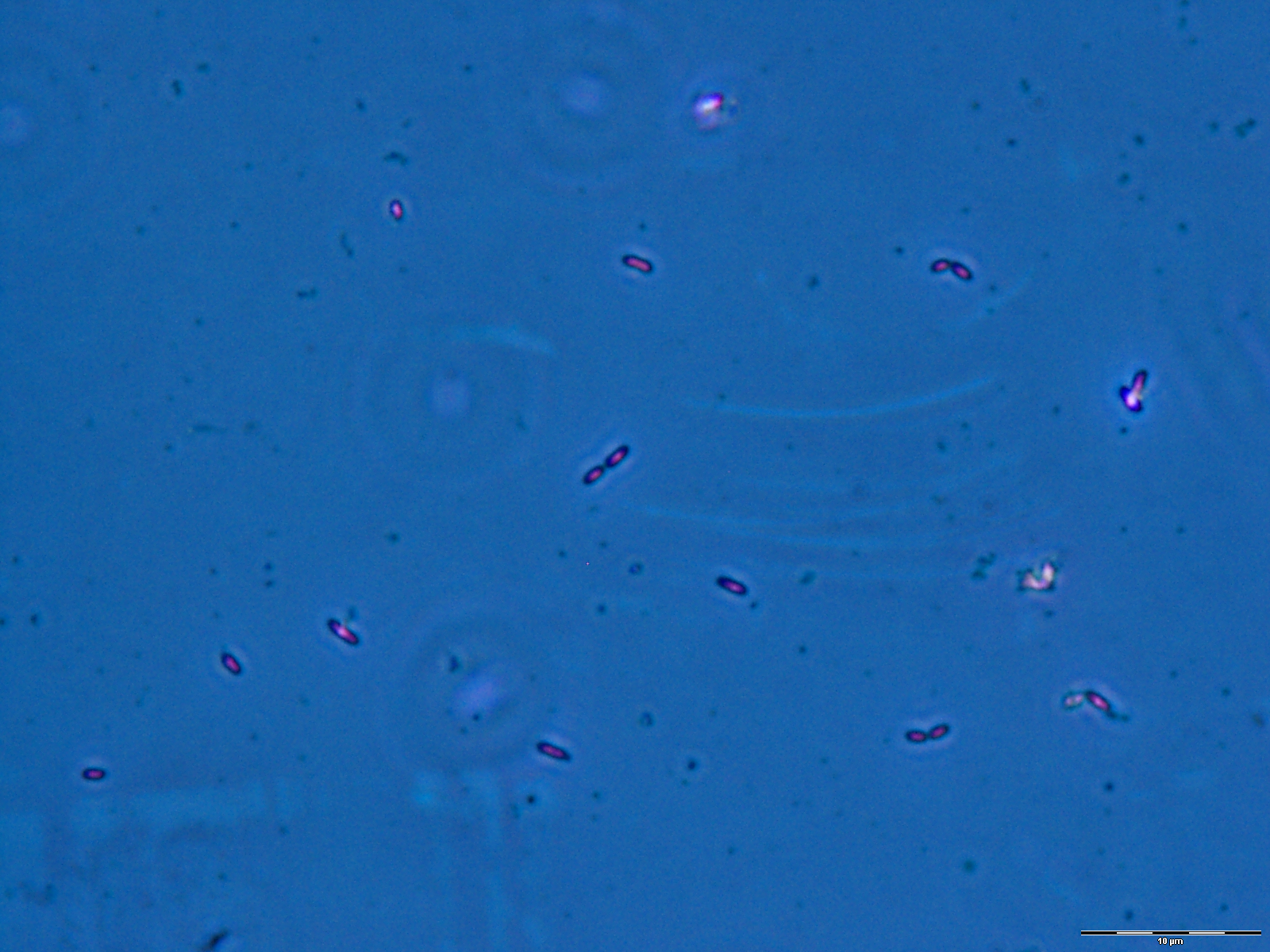
- Geobacter sulfurreducens

Scientific classification
- Domain: Bacteria
- Kingdom: Pseudomonadati
- Phylum: Thermodesulfobacteriota
- Class: Desulfuromonadia
- Order: Geobacterales
- Family: Geobacteraceae
- Genus: Geobacter; Lovley et al. 1995

Type species
- Geobacter metallireducens Lovley et al. 1995

Species
- See text

= Geobacter =

Genus of anaerobic bacteria found in soil

Geobacter is a genus of bacteria. Geobacter species use anaerobic respiration to alter the redox state of minerals and many pollutants, a trait that makes them useful in bioremediation. Geobacter was the first organism described with the ability to completely oxidize organic compounds to carbon dioxide, and transfer these electrons to metals such as Fe(III), Mn(IV), and U(VI). Geobacter species are also found to be able to transfer electrons to conductive surfaces such as graphite electrodes. They are found in anaerobic habitats including wetlands, subsurface aquifers, soils, and aquatic sediment.

== History ==
Geobacter metallireducens was first isolated by Derek R Lovley in 1987 in sand sediment from the Potomac River in Washington D.C. The first strain was deemed strain GS-15.

== Phylogeny ==
The currently accepted taxonomy is based on the List of Prokaryotic names with Standing in Nomenclature (LPSN) and National Center for Biotechnology Information (NCBI).

16S rRNA based LTP_10_2024

- Geobacter
  - G. pickeringii Shelobolina et al. 2007
  - - - G. sulfurreducens Caccavo et al. 1995
      - - G. anodireducens Sun et al. 2014
        - G. soli Zhou et al. 2014
    - - G. benzoatilyticus Yang et al. 2022
      - - G. hydrogenophilus Coates et al. 2001
        - - G. grbiciae Coates et al. 2001
          - G. metallireducens Lovley et al. 1995

120 marker proteins based GTDB 10-RS226

- Geobacter
  - G. pickeringii
  - - - G. anodireducens [incl. G. soli]
      - G. sulfurreducens
    - - G. benzoatilyticus
      - - G. hydrogenophilus
        - G. metallireducens [incl. G. grbiciae]

Species incertae sedis:

- "Ca. G. eutrophica" corrig. Mei et al. 2018
- "G. hephaestius" Janssen 2004
- "G. humireducens" Holmes et al. 2003

Assigned to different genera:

- Geobacter argillaceus Shelobolina et al. 2007 ["Geomobilibacter argillaceus" (Shelobolina et al. 2007) Xu et al. 2021]
- Geobacter lovleyi Sung et al. 2009 [Trichlorobacter lovleyi (Sung et al. 2009) Waite et al. 2020]
- Geobacter psychrophilus Nevin et al. 2005 ["Pseudopelobacter psychrophilus" (Nevin et al. 2005) Waite et al. 2020]
- Geobacter thiogenes (De Wever et al. 2001) Nevin et al. 2007 [Trichlorobacter thiogenes De Wever et al. 2001]

== Metabolic mechanisms ==
Based on experiments physically separating Fe(III) oxides from cells, using dialysis menbranes or gels to sequester the metals, evidence suggested cells required direct physical contact in order to use metal ions as terminal electron acceptors (TEAs). The discovery of conductive filaments extending from Geobacter species, and the finding that mutations eliminating these filaments decreased growth with metals led to the proposal of "bacterial nanowires" able to connect cells to metals. These nanowires were first proposed to be pili, but have since been shown to be made of cytochromes assembled into long conductive fibers. Recent discoveries have revealed that some Geobacter species, such as Geobacter uraniireducens, not only do not seem to possess conductive filaments, but also do not need direct physical contact in order to utilize the metal ions, suggesting some Geobacter species may secrete soluble molecules that carry electrons beyond the cell. For example, one other way of transporting electrons is via a flavin-mediated electron shuttle, which is observed in Shewanella .

Another observed metabolic phenomenon is the cooperation between Geobacter species, in which several species cooperate in metabolizing a mixture of chemicals that neither could process alone. For example, when supplied with ethanol as an electron donor and fumarate as the electron acceptor, G. metallireducens oxidized the ethanol, generating an excess of electrons that were passed through direct electrical transfer to G. sulfurreducens via nanowires grown between them, enabling G. sulfurreducens to reduce the fumarate .

== Applications ==
=== Biodegradation and bioremediation ===
Geobacter's ability to oxidize oil-based pollutants and reduce radioactive materials has been used in environmental clean-up for underground petroleum spills and for the precipitation of reduced uranium out of groundwater.

Microbial biodegradation of recalcitrant organic pollutants is of great environmental significance and involves intriguing novel biochemical reactions. In particular, hydrocarbons and halogenated compounds have long been doubted to be anaerobically degradable, but the isolation of hitherto unknown anaerobic hydrocarbon-degrading and reductively dehalogenating bacteria documented these processes in nature. Novel biochemical reactions were discovered, enabling the respective metabolic pathways, but progress in the molecular understanding of these bacteria was slowed by the absence of genetic systems for most of them. However, several complete genome sequences later became available for such bacteria. The genome of the hydrocarbon degrading and iron-reducing species G. metallireducens (accession nr. NC_007517) was determined in 2008. The genome revealed the presence of genes for reductive dehalogenases, suggesting a wide dehalogenating spectrum. Moreover, genome sequences provided insights into the evolution of reductive dehalogenation and differing strategies for niche adaptation.

Geobacter species are often the predominant organisms when extracellular electron transfer is an important bioremediation process in subsurface environments. Therefore, a systems biology approach to understanding and optimizing bioremediation with Geobacter species has been initiated with the ultimate goal of developing in silico models that can predict the growth and metabolism of Geobacter species under a diversity of subsurface conditions. The genomes of multiple Geobacter species have been sequenced. Detailed functional genomic/physiological studies on one species, G. sulfurreducens was conducted. Genome-based models of several Geobacter species that are able to predict physiological responses under different environmental conditions are available. Quantitative analysis of gene transcript levels during in situ uranium bioremediation demonstrated that it is possible to track in situ rates of metabolism and the in situ metabolic state of Geobacter in the subsurface.

=== Biofilm conductivity ===
Many Geobacter species, such as G. sulfurreducens, are capable of creating thick networks of biofilms on the anodes of microbial fuel cell for extracellular electron transfer. While prior imaging experiments suggested cytochromes within the biofilm associate with pili to form extracellular structures called nanowires, when the structures of nanowires were solved it was found that these filaments were actually composed only of cytochromes. These cytochrome nanowires carry electrons from one microorganism to the next, and ultimately are accepted by the electrode, allowing the entire biofilm to respire.

Electric currents are produced when the transfer of these electrons to anodes is coupled to the oxidation of intracellular organic wastes. Previous research has proposed that the high conductivity of Geobacter biofilms can be used to power microbial fuel cells and to generate electricity from organic waste products. In particular, G. sulfurreducens holds one of the highest records for microbial fuel cell current density that researchers have ever measured in vitro. This ability can be attributed to biofilm conductivity, as highly conductive biofilms have been found to be positively correlated with high current densities in microbial fuel cells.

At the moment, the development of microbial fuel cells for power generation purposes is partly restricted by low current density (mA per square centimeter of electrode) compared to industrial sources of power, and an poor understanding of what limits extracellular electron transfer over long distances in biofilms. As such, many researchers are currently studying how we can utilize biofilm conductivity to our advantage to produce even higher current densities. Low pH environments have been proposed to form inside biofilms, limiting electron transfer from microorganisms to cytochromes. The presence of nonconductive filaments such as pili or flagella on Geobacter species has been proposed to affect current generation by interfering with efficient electron transfer. Factors limiting the individual turnover rate of cells, and how many cells can link together in a biofilm, will both need to be understood to maximize electricity production in the future.

=== Neuromorphic memristor ===
In a University of Massachusetts Amherst study, a neuromorphic memory (memristor) utilized Geobacter biofilm cut into thin nanowire strands, although the proteins or DNA making up the nanowires remains unknown. The nanowire strands conduct a low voltage similar to that of a neurons in a human brain. In a paper co-authored by Derek Lovely, Jun Yao observed that his team can "modulate the conductivity, or the plasticity of the nanowire-memristor synapse so it can emulate biological components for brain-inspired computing....".

== Popular culture ==
Geobacter has become an icon for teaching about microbial electrogenesis and microbial fuel cells and has appeared in educational kits that are available for students and hobbyists.

== See also ==
- Forest ring
- List of bacterial orders
- List of bacteria genera
- Shewanella
