= Geobacteraceae =

Scientific classification
- Domain: Bacteria
- Kingdom: Pseudomonadati
- Phylum: Proteobacteria
- Class: Desulfuromonadia
- Order: Geobacterales
- Family: Geobacteraceae; Holmes et al. 2004 non Lonergan et al. 1996

Genera
- See text

Family of bacteria

The Geobacteraceae are a family within the Thermodesulfobacteriota.

== Phylogeny ==
The currently accepted taxonomy is based on the List of Prokaryotic names with Standing in Nomenclature (LPSN) and National Center for Biotechnology Information (NCBI).

16S rRNA based LTP_10_2024

- Geobacteraceae s.l.
  - Geobacter
  - - - "Geomobilibacter"
      - - Geobacter psychrophilus
        - - - Pelotalea
            - "Pseudopelobacter"
          - - Trichlorobacter
            - Oryzomonas
    - - Geoanaerobacter
      - - Geomobilimonas
        - - Geotalea
          - - Geomesophilobacter
            - Geomonas
              [incl. Citrifermentans Waite et al. 2020]

120 marker proteins based GTDB 10-RS226

- - - "Pseudopelobacteraceae"
      - Trichlorobacter De Wever et al. 2001
      - - Oryzomonas Xu et al. 2020
        - - Pelotalea Xu et al. 2022
          - "Pseudopelobacter" Waite et al. 2020
  - - Geobacteraceae_A
      - Geoanaerobacter Xu et al. 2022
      - "Geomobilibacter" Xu et al. 2021
    - Geobacteraceae s.s.
      - Geobacter Lovley et al. 1995
      - - Geomobilimonas Xu et al. 2022
        - - Geotalea Waite et al. 2020
          - - Geomesophilobacter Zhang et al. 2021
            - Geomonas Xu et al. 2020
              non Khan et al. 2020 [incl. Citrifermentans]

== See also ==
- List of bacterial orders
- List of bacteria genera
