= Geobacterales =

Scientific classification
- Domain: Bacteria
- Kingdom: Pseudomonadati
- Phylum: Thermodesulfobacteriota
- Class: Desulfuromonadia
- Order: Geobacterales; Waite et al. 2020

Families
- Geobacteraceae; "Pseudopelobacteraceae"

Order of bacteria

Geobacterales is an order of bacteria within the phylum Thermodesulfobacteriota.

== Phylogeny ==
The currently accepted taxonomy is based on the List of Prokaryotic names with Standing in Nomenclature (LPSN) and National Center for Biotechnology Information (NCBI).

16S rRNA based LTP_10_2024

- Geobacteraceae s.l. [incl. "Pseudopelobacteraceae"]

120 marker proteins based GTDB 10-RS226

- - "Pseudopelobacteraceae" Waite et al. 2020
  - - DSM12255
    - Geobacteraceae Holmes, Nevin & Lovley 2004 non Lonergan et al. 1996

== See also ==
- List of bacterial orders
- List of bacteria genera
