= Desulfuromonadia =

Scientific classification
- Domain: Bacteria
- Kingdom: Pseudomonadati
- Phylum: Thermodesulfobacteriota
- Class: Desulfuromonadia; Waite et al. 2020

Orders
- Desulfuromonadales; Geobacterales

Synonyms
- "Geobacteridae" Cavalier-Smith 2020

Class of bacteria

The Desulfuromonadia are a class of anaerobic bacteria within the phylum Thermodesulfobacteriota. Their cells are curved or rod shaped and often motile. They display chemoorganotrophic, chemolithoautotrophic, or chemolithoheterotrophic growth by respiratory or fermentative metabolism. Several members can use sulfur or ferric iron as electron acceptors.

== See also ==
- List of bacterial orders
- List of bacteria genera
