= Sulfur-reducing bacteria =

Microorganisms able to reduce elemental sulfur to hydrogen sulfide

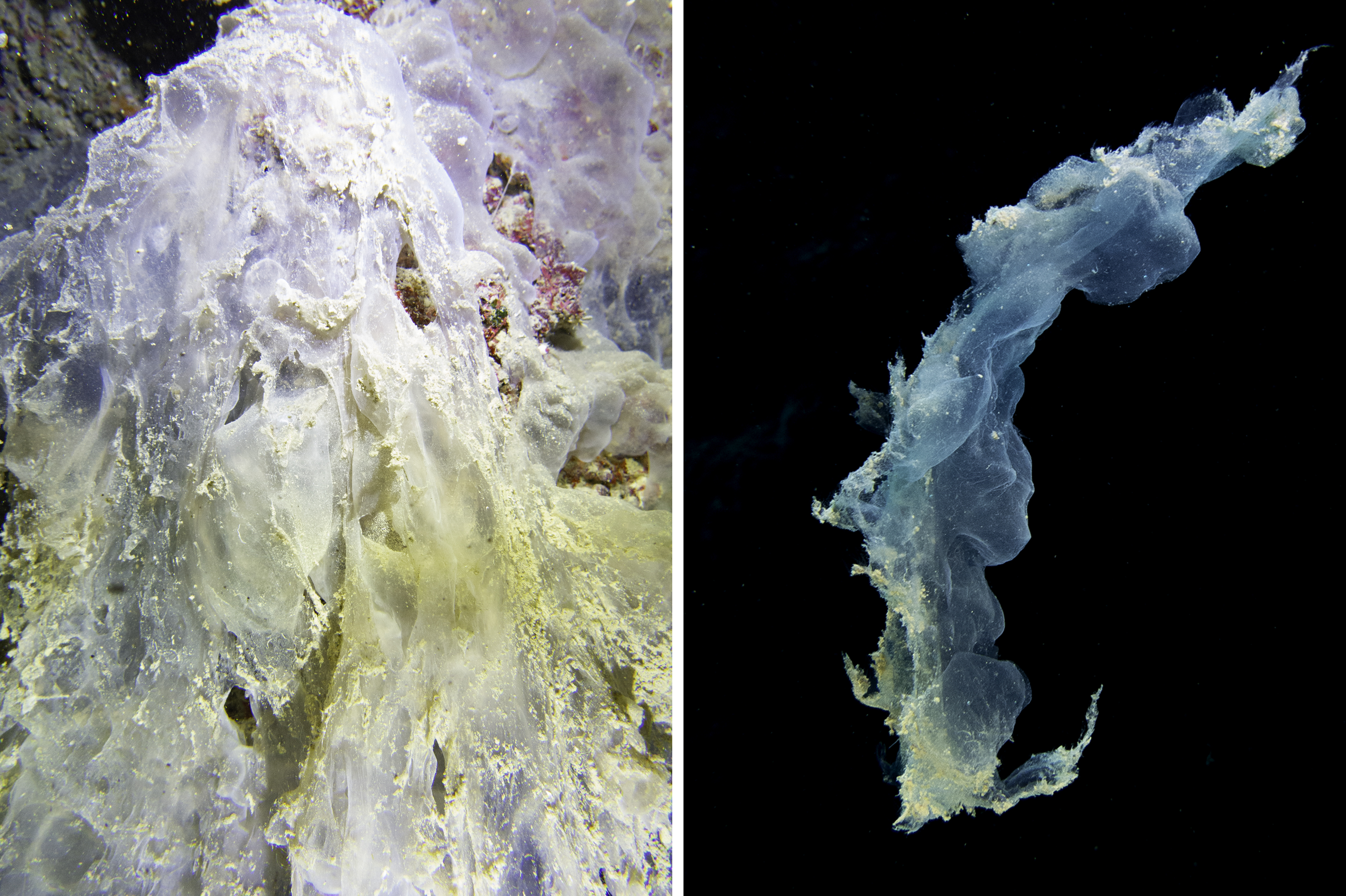
On the left: Bioconstructions created by sulfur bacteria in a sulfurous cave at a depth of about 30 mt in Santa Cesarea Terme, Lecce, Italy. On the right: The same bioconstructions suspended in water. These structures are extremely fragile, and even a small air bubble emitted by a diver can disperse them in the water.

Sulfur-reducing bacteria are microorganisms able to reduce elemental sulfur (S^{0}) to hydrogen sulfide (H_{2}S). These microbes use inorganic sulfur compounds as electron acceptors to sustain several activities such as respiration, conserving energy and growth, in absence of oxygen. The final product of these processes, sulfide, has a considerable influence on the chemistry of the environment and, in addition, is used as electron donor for a large variety of microbial metabolisms. Several types of bacteria and many non-methanogenic archaea can reduce sulfur. Microbial sulfur reduction was already shown in early studies, which highlighted the first proof of S^{0} reduction in a vibrioid bacterium from mud, with sulfur as electron acceptor and H_{2} as electron donor. The first pure cultured species of sulfur-reducing bacteria, Desulfuromonas acetoxidans, was discovered in 1976 and described by Pfennig Norbert and Biebel Hanno as an anaerobic sulfur-reducing and acetate-oxidizing bacterium, not able to reduce sulfate. Only few taxa are true sulfur-reducing bacteria, using sulfur reduction as the only or main catabolic reaction. Normally, they couple this reaction with the oxidation of acetate, succinate or other organic compounds. In general, sulfate-reducing bacteria are able to use both sulfate and elemental sulfur as electron acceptors. Thanks to its abundancy and thermodynamic stability, sulfate is the most studied electron acceptor for anaerobic respiration that involves sulfur compounds. Elemental sulfur, however, is very abundant and important, especially in deep-sea hydrothermal vents, hot springs and other extreme environments, making its isolation more difficult. Some bacteria – such as Proteus, Campylobacter, Pseudomonas and Salmonella – have the ability to reduce sulfur, but can also use oxygen and other terminal electron acceptors.

== Taxonomy ==
Sulfur reducers are known to cover about 74 genera within the Bacteria domain. Several types of sulfur-reducing bacteria have been discovered in different habitats like deep and shallow sea hydrothermal vents, freshwater, volcanic acidic hot springs and others. Many sulfur reducers belong to the phylum Thermodesulfobacteriota (Desulfuromonas, Pelobacter, Desulfurella, Geobacter), the class Gammaproteobacteria, and the phylum Campylobacterota according to GTDB classification. Other phyla that present sulfur-reducing bacteria are: Bacillota (Desulfitobacterium, Ammonifex, and Carboxydothermus), Aquificota (Desulfurobacterium and Aquifex), Synergistota (Dethiosulfovibrio), Deferribacterota (Geovibrio), Thermodesulfobacteriota, Spirochaetota, and Chrysiogenota.

Table 1. Genera of sulfur-reducing bacteria (NCBI classification).
Phylum	Class	Genus (74) (and species)
Aquificota	Aquificia	Aquifex (pyrophilus), Balnearium (lithotrophicum), Desulfurobacterium (crinifex, pacificum, thermolithotrophum), Persephonella (guaimasensis, marina), Thermocrinis (ruber), Thermosulfidibacter (takaii), Thermovibrio (ammonificans, guaymasensis, ruber)
Bacteroidota	Bacteroidia	Petrimonas (sulfuriphila)
Caldisericota	Caldisericia	Caldisericum (exile)
Calditrichota	Calditrichae	Caldithrix (abyssi)
Chrysiogenota	Chrysiogenetes	Desulfurispirillum (alkaliphilum)
Coprothermobacterota	Coprothermobacteria	Coprothermobacter (proteoliticus)
Deferribacterota	Deferribacteres	Deferribacter (desulfuricans), Geovibrio (thiophilus)
Deinococcota	Deinococci	Oceanithermus (desulfurans)
Bacillota	Clostridia	Ammonifex (degensii), Carboxydothermus (pertinax), Clostridium (thiosulfatireducens, tunisiense, sulfidigenes), Dethiobacter (alkaliphilus), Desulfitibacter (alkalitolerans), Desulfitispora (alkaliphila), Desulfitobacterium (hafniense, chlororespirans, dehalogenans, metallireducens), Desulfosporosinus (acididurans, acidiphilus, orientis, meridiei, auripigmenti), Desulfotomaculum (thermosubterraneus, salinum, geothermicum, reducens, intricatum), Ercella (succinogenes), Halanaerobium (congolense), Halarsenatibacter (silvermanii), Sporanaerobacter (acetigenes), Thermoanaerobacter (sulfurophilus)
Pseudomonadota	Gammaproteobacteria	Acidithiobacillus (ferrooxidans), Pseudomonas (mendocina), Shewanella (putrefaciens)
Thermodesulfobacteriota		Desulfobacter (postgatei), Desulfobacterium, Desulfobotulus (alkaliphilus), Desulfobulbus (propionicus), Desulfomicrobium (baculatum), Desulfomonile (tiedjei), Desulfonatronovibrio (thiodismutans), Desulfonatronum (thioautotrophicum), Desulfovermiculus (halophilus), Desulfovibrio, Desulfurella, Desulfurivibrio (alkaliphilus), Desulfuromonas, Desulfuromusa, Geoalkalibacter (subterraneus), Geobacter, Hippea (maritima), Pelobacter Caldimicrobium (exile), Thermodesulfobacterium (geofontis)
Campylobacterota		Caminibacter, Hydrogenimonas, Lebetimonas, Nautilia, Nitratiruptor, Sulfurimonas, Sulfurospirillum, Sulfurovum, Thioreductor (incertae sedis), Wolinella (succinogenes)
Spirochaetota	Spirochaetia	Spirochaeta (perfilievii, smaragdinae)
Synergistota	Synergistia	Anaerobaculum (mobile, thermoterrenum), Dethiosulfovibrio (acidaminovorans, marinus, peptidovorans, russensis), Thermanaerovibrio (acidaminovorans, velox), Thermovirga (lienii),
Thermotogota	Thermotogae	Fervidobacterium (changbaicum, islandicum, nodosum, riparium, ), Geotoga (petraea, subterranea), Marinitoga (camini, hydrogenitolerans, okinawensis, piezophila), Mesotoga (infera, prima), Petrotoga (mexicana, miotherma, mobilis), Thermosipho (aficanus), Thermotoga (lettingae, maritima, naphthophila, neapolitana),

Table 2. Genera of sulfur-reducing bacteria (GTDB classification)
Phylum	Class	Genus (74)
Aquificota	Aquificia	Aquifex, Persephonella, Thermocrinis
Thermodesulfobacteriota		Balnearium, Desulfurobacterium, Thermovibrio
	Desulfobacteria	Desulfobacter, Desulfobacterium, Desulfobotulus
	Desulfobulbia	Desulfobulbus, Desulfurivibrio
	Desulfovibrionia	Desulfomicrobium, Desulfonatronovibrio, Desulfonatronum, Desulfovermiculus, Desulfovibrio,
	Desulfuromonadia;	Desulfuromonas, Desulfuromusa, Geoalkalibacter, Geobacter, Pelobacter
	Desulfomonilia	Desulfomonile
	Thermodesulfobacteria	Caldimicrobium, Thermodesulfobacterium,
	Thermosulfidibacteria	Thermosulfidibacter
Bacteroidota	Bacteroidia	Petrimonas
Caldisericota	Caldisericia	Caldisericum
Calditrichota	Calditrichia	Caldithrix
Campylobacterota	Campylobacteria	Caminibacter, Hydrogenimonas, Lebetimonas, Nautilia, Nitratiruptor, Sulfurimonas, Sulfurospirillum, Sulfurovum, Wolinella
	Desulfurellia	Desulfurella, Hippea
Chrysiogenota	Chrysiogenetes	Desulfurispirillum
Coprothermobacterota	Coprothermobacteria	Coprothermobacter
Deferribacterota	Deferribacteres	Deferribacter, Geovibrio
Deinococcota	Deinococci	Oceanithermus
Bacillota_A	Clostridia	Clostridium, Sporanaerobacter
	Thermoanaerobacteria	Thermoanaerobacter
Bacillota_B	Desulfitobacteria	Desulfitobacterium, Desulfosporosinus
	Desulfotomaculia	Ammonifex, Carboxydothermus, Desulfotomaculum
	Moorellia	Desulfitibacter
Bacillota_D	Dethiobacteria	Dethiobacter
Bacillota_F	Halanaerobia	Halanaerobium, Halarsenatibacter
Pseudomonadota	Gammaproteobacteria	Acidithiobacillus, Pseudomonas, Shewanella
Spirochaetota	Spirochaetia	Sediminispirochaeta
Synergistota	Synergistia	Anaerobaculum, Dethiosulfovibrio, Thermanaerovibrio,
Thermotogota	Thermotogae	Fervidobacterium, Geotoga, Marinitoga, Mesotoga, Petrotoga, Thermosipho, Thermotoga
Unclassified (from NCBI)		Desulfitispora (alkaliphila), Ercella (succinogenes), Thermovirga, Thioreductor

== Metabolism ==
Sulfur reduction metabolism is an ancient process, found in the deep branches of the phylogenetic tree. Sulfur reduction uses elemental sulfur (S^{0}) and generates hydrogen sulfide (H_{2}S) as the main end product. This metabolism is widespread in extreme environments, where, especially in recent years, many microorganisms have been isolated, providing new and important data on the subject.

Many sulfur-reducing bacteria are able to produce ATP through lithotrophic sulfur respiration, using zero-valence sulfur as electron acceptor, for instance the genera Wolinella, Ammonifex, Desulfuromonas and Desulfurobacterium. On the other side, there are obligate fermenters able to reduce elemental sulfur, for example Thermotoga, Thermosipho and Fervidobacterium. Among these fermenters, there are species, such as Thermotoga maritina, that are not dependent on sulfur reduction and utilize it as a supplementary electron sink. Some researches propose the hypothesis that polysulfide could be an intermediate of sulfur respiration, due to the conversion of elemental sulfur into polysulfide that occurs in sulfide solutions, performing this reaction:

$nS^0+HS^-\Longrightarrow S^{2-}_{n+1} +H^+$

=== Pseudomonadota ===
The Pseudomonadota are a major phylum of gram-negative bacteria. There is a wide range of metabolisms. Most members are facultative or obligately anaerobic, chemoautotrophs and heterotrophs. Many are able to move using flagella, and others are nonmotile. They are currently divided into several classes, referred to by Greek letters, based on rRNA sequences: Alphaproteobacteria, Betaproteobacteria, Gammaproteobacteria, Zetaproteobacteria, etc.

==== Class Gammaproteobacteria ====
The Gammaproteobacteria class include several medically, ecologically and scientifically important groups of bacteria. They are major organisms in diverse marine ecosystems and even extreme environments. This class contains a huge variety of taxonomic and metabolic diversity, including aerobic and anaerobic species, chemolitoauthotrophic, chemoorganotrophic and phototrophic species and also free living, biofilms formers, commensal and symbionts.

===== Acidithiobacillus spp. =====
Acidithiobacillus are chemolithoautotrophs, gram-negative rod-shaped bacteria, using energy from the oxidation of iron and sulfur-containing minerals for growth. They can live at extremely low pH (pH 1–2) and fix both carbon and nitrogen from the atmosphere. It solubilizes copper and other metals from rocks and plays an important role in nutrient and metal biogeochemical cycling in acid environments. Acidithiobacillus ferrooxidans is abundant in natural environments associated with pyritic ore bodies, coal deposits, and their acidified drainages. It obtains energy from the oxidation of reduced sulfur compounds and can also reduce ferric ions and elemental sulfur, thereby promoting the recycling of iron and sulfur compounds under anaerobic conditions. It can also fix CO_{2} and nitrogen and be a primary producer of carbon and nitrogen in acidic environments.

===== Shewanella spp. =====
Shewanella are gram-negative, motile bacilli. The first description of the species was provided in 1931, Shewanella putrefaciens, a non-fermentative bacillus with a single polar flagellum that grows well on conventional solid media. This species is pathogenic for humans, even if infections are rare and reported especially in the geographic area characterized by warm climates.

===== Pseudomonas spp. =====
Pseudomonas are gram-negative chemoorganotrophic Gammaproteobacteria, straight or slightly curved rod-shaped. They can move thanks to one or several polar flagella; rarely nonmotile. Aerobic, having a strictly respiratory type of metabolism with oxygen as the terminal electron acceptor; in some cases, allowing growth anaerobically, nitrate can be used as an alternate electron acceptor. Almost all the species fail to grow under acid conditions (pH 4.5 or lower). Pseudomonas are widely distributed in nature. Some species are pathogenic for humans, animals, or plants. Type species: Pseudomonas mendocina.

=== Phylum Thermodesulfobacteriota ===
The Thermodesulfobacteriota phylum comprises several morphologically distinct gram-negative, non-spore-forming bacterial groups that exhibit either anaerobic or aerobic growth. They are ubiquitous in marine sediments and contain most of the known sulfur-reducing bacteria (e.g. Desulfuromonas spp.). Aerobic bacteria can digest other bacteria, and several of these members are important constituents of the microflora in soil and water.

==== Desulfuromusa spp. ====
The genus Desulfuromusa includes obligately anaerobic bacteria that use sulfur as an electron acceptor and short-chain fatty acids, dicarboxylic acids, and amino acids as electron donors that are oxidised completely to CO_{2}. They are Gram-negative, complete-oxidizer bacteria; their cells are motile and slightly curved or rod-shaped. Three sulfur reducing species are known, Desulfromusa kysingii, Desulfuromusa bakii and Desulfuromusa succinoxidans.

==== Desulfurella spp. ====
Desulfurella are short, rod-shaped, gram-negative cells, motile thanks to a single polar flagellum or nonmotile, non-sporeforming. Obligately anaerobic, moderate thermophilic, they generally occur in warm sediments and in thermally heated cyanobacterial or bacterial communities that are rich in organic compounds and elemental sulfur. Type species: Desulfurella acetivorans.

==== Hippea spp. ====
Hippea species are moderate thermophiles, neutrophiles to moderate acidophiles, obligate anaerobes, sulfur-reducing bacteria with gram-negative rod-shaped cells. They are able to grow lithotrophically with hydrogen and sulfur, and oxidize completely volatile fatty acids, fatty acids and alcohols. They inhabit submarine hot vents. The type species is Hippea maritima.

==== Desulfuromonas spp. ====
Desulfuromonas species are gram-negative, mesophilic, obligately anaerobic and complete oxidizers sulfur-reducing bacteria. They are able to grow on acetate as the sole organic substrate and reduce elemental sulfur or polysulfide to sulfide. Currently known species of the genus Desulfuromonas are Desulfuromonas acetoxidans, Desulfuromonas acetexigens, the marine organism Desulfuromonas palmitates and Desulfuromonas thiophila.

- Desulfiromonas thiophila is an obligate anaerobic bacterium that uses sulfur as its only electron acceptor. Multiplied by binary fission, and cells are motile thanks to polar flagella. They live in anoxic mud of freshwater sulfur springs, at a temperature from 26 to 30 °C and pH 6.9 to 7.9.

==== Geobacter spp. ====
Geobacter species have a respiratory metabolism with Fe(III) serving as the common terminal electron acceptor in all species.

- Geobacter sulfurreducens was isolated from a drainage ditch in Norman, Okla. It is rod-shaped, gram-negative, non-motile, and non-spore-forming. The optimum temperature range is 30 to 35°. About the metabolism, it is a strict anaerobic chemoorganotroph that oxidizes acetate with Fe(III), S, Co(III), fumarate, or malate as the electron acceptor. Hydrogen is also used as an electron donor for Fe(III) reduction, whereas other carboxylic acids, sugars, alcohols, amino acids, yeast extract, phenol, and benzoate are not. C-type cytochromes were found in cells.

==== Pelobacter spp. ====
Pelobacter is a unique group of fermentative microorganisms belonging to the phylum Thermodesulfobacteriota. They fermentatively consume alcohols such as 2,3-butanediol, acetoin and ethanol, but not sugars, with acetate and ethanol, and/or hydrogen as end products.

- Paleobacter carbinolcus, isolated from anoxic mud, belongs to the family Desulfuromonadaceae. This bacterial species grow by fermentation, syntrophic hydrogen/formate transfer, or electron transfer to sulfur from short-chain alcohols, hydrogen or formate but they don't oxidize acetate. There is no recent information about sugar fermentation or autotrophic growth. Genome sequencing analysis demonstrated the expression of c-type cytochromes and the utilization of Fe(III) as a terminal acceptor, with the indirect reduction of elemental sulfur serving as a shuttle for electron transfer to Fe(III). A recent study found that this electron transfer involves two periplasmic thioredoxins (Pcar_0426, Pcar_0427), an outer membrane protein (Pcar_0428), and a cytoplasmic oxidoreductase (Pcar_0429) encoded by the most highly upregulated genes.

=== Thermodesulfobacteriota ===
Thermodesulfobacteriota are gram-negative, rod-shaped cells that occur singly, in pairs, or in chains in young cultures. Do not form spores. Usually nonmotile, but motility might be observed in some species. Thermophilic, strictly anaerobic, chemoheterotrophs.

=== Phylum Campylobacterota ===
The phylum Campylobacterota presents many sulfur-oxidizing known species, that have been recently recognized as able to reduce elemental sulfur, in some cases also preferring this pathway, coupled with hydrogen oxidation. Here's a list of the species able to reduce elemental sulfur. The mechanism by which sulfur is reduced remains unclear for some of these species.

Table 3. Sulfur-reducing bacteria among Epsiloproteobacteria/Campylobacteriota
	Species
From Hydrothermal vents	Caminibacter spp. (C. hydrogeniphilus, C. mediatlanticus, C. profundus)
	Hydrogenimonas thermophila
	Lebetimonas acidiphila
	Nautilia spp. (N. abyssi, N. lithotrophica, N. nitratireducens, N. profundicola)
	Nitratiruptor tergarcus
	Sulfurimonas spp.
	Sulfurospirillum sp. Am-N
	Sulfurovum sp. NCB37-1
	Thioreductor micantisoli
From cattle rumen	Wolinella succinogenes

==== Wolinella ====
Wolinella is a sulfur-reducing genus of bacteria and an incomplete oxidizer that cannot use acetate as an electron donor. Publicly known is one species, Wolinella succinogenens.

- Wolinella succinogenens is a well-known non-vent sulfur-reducing bacterium, found in cattle rumen, that utilizes a [Ni-fe] hydrogenase to oxidize hydrogen and a single periplasmatic polysulfide reductase (PsrABC) bound to the inner membrane to reduce elemental sulfur. PsrA is responsible for polysulfide reduction to H_{2}S, at a molybdopterin active site, PsrB is an [FeS] electron transfer protein, and PsrC is a quinone-containing membrane anchor.

==== Sulfurospirillum ====
Sulfurospirillum species are sulfur-reducing bacteria and incomplete oxidizer that use either H_{2} or formate as electron donor but not acetate.

==== Sulfurovum ====
- Sulfurovum sp. NCB37-1 has been given the hypothesis in which a polysulfide reductase (PsrABC) is involved in its sulfur reduction.

==== Sulfurimonas ====
Sulfurimonas species were previously considered to be chemolithoautotrophic sulfur-oxidizing bacteria (SOB), and there was only genetic evidence supporting a possible sulfur-reducing metabolism, but now it has been shown that sulfur reduction also occurs in this genus. The mechanism and the enzymes involved in this process have also been deduced, using Sulfurimonas sp. NW10 as a representative. In particular, the presence of both a cytoplasmic and a periplasmic polysulfide reductases has been detected, in order to reduce cyclooctasulfur, which is the most common form of elemental sulfur in vent environments.

- Sulfurimonas sp. NW10 shows an over-expression of the gene clusters ($psrA_1B_1CDE$ and $psrA_2B_2$) coding for the two reductases while reducing sulfur. These clusters were also found in other Sulfurimonas species isolated from hydrothermal vents, meaning that sulfur reduction is common in Sulfurimonas spp.

Further genetic analysis revealed that the polysulfide reductases from Sulfurimonas sp.NW10 shares less than 40% sequence similarity with the one from W. succinogenes. This means that through time, there has been a significant genetic differentiation between the two bacteria, most likely due to their different environments. Furthermore, the cytoplasmic sulfur-reduction performed by Sulfurimonas sp. NW10 is nowadays considered unique, being the only example among all the mesophilic sulfur-reducing bacteria. Before this discovery, only two hyperthermophilic bacteria were known to be able to do cytoplasmic sulfur-reduction, Aquifex aeolicus and Thermovibrio ammonificans.

==== Nautilia ====
Nautilia species are anaerobic, neutrophile, thermophilic sulfur-reducing bacteria, first discovered and isolated from a polychaete worm inhabiting deep sea hydrothermal vents, Alvinella pompejana. They are very short, gram-negative, motile and rod-shaped cells with a single polar flagellum. They grow chemolithoautotrophically on molecular hydrogen, elemental sulfur and CO_{2}. The use of sugars, peptides, organic acids or alcohols is not required in either the absence or presence of sulfur. They rarely use sulfite and colloidal sulfur as electron acceptors. Sulfate, thiosulfate, nitrate, fumarate and ferric iron are not used. Four species have been found: Nautilia lithotrophica, Nautilia profundicola, Nautilia nitratireducens and Nautilia abyssi. The type species is Nautilia lithotrophica.

- Nautilia abyssi is a gram-negative sulfur-reducing bacterium that lives in anaerobic conditions at hydrothermal vents. It was first discovered living on a chimney at a depth of 2620 meters on the East Pacific Rise. It grows at temperatures between 33° and 65°C and at pH 5.0–8.0. Under optimal conditions (60°C, pH 6.0–6.5), the generation time is 120 minutes. Like other species in this genus, cells move by means of a single polar flagellum. For metabolism, N. abyssi uses H_{2} as an electron donor, elemental sulfur as an electron acceptor and CO_{2} as the carbon source.

==== Caminibacter ====
- Caminibacter mediatlanticus was first isolated from a deep-sea hydrothermal vent on the Middle Atlantic Ridge. It is a thermophilic chemolithoautotroph, H_{2}-oxidizing marine bacteria, that uses nitrate or elemental sulfur as electron acceptors, producing ammonia or hydrogen sulfide, and it cannot use oxygen, thiosulfate, sulfite, selenate and arsenate. Its growth optimum is at 55 °C, and it seems to be inhibited by acetate, formate, lactate and peptone.

=== Aquificota ===
Aquificota phylum comprises rod-shaped, motile cells. Includes chemoorganotrophs, some of which can reduce elemental sulfur. Growth has been observed between pH 6.0 and 8.0.

==== Aquifex ====
Aquifex are rod-shaped, gram-negative, nonsporulating cells with rounded ends. Wedge-shaped refractile areas in cells form during growth. Type species: Aquifex pyrophilus.

==== Desulfurobacterium ====
Desulfurobacterium is a rod-shaped, gram-negative cell. Type species: Desulfurobacterium thermolithotrophum.

==== Thermovibrio ammonificans ====
Thermovibrio ammonificans is a gram-negative sulfur-reducing bacterium, found in deep-sea hydrothermal vent chimneys. It is a chemolithoautotroph that grows in the presence of H_{2} and CO_{2}, using nitrate or elemental sulfur as electron acceptors with concomitant formation of ammonium or hydrogen sulfide, respectively. Thiosulfate, sulfite and oxygen are not used as electron acceptors. Cells are short, rod-shaped, and motile thanks to polar flagellation. Their growth range temperature is from 60 °C to 80 °C and pH 5–7.

==== Thermosulfidibacter spp. ====
Thermosulfidibacter are gram-negative, anaerobic, thermophilic and neutrophilic bacteria. Strictly chemolithoautotrophic. The type species is Thermosulfidibacter takaii.

- Thermosulfidibacter takaii are motile rods with a polar flagellum. Strictly anaerobic. Growth occurs at 55–78 °C (optimum, 70 °C), pH 5.0–7.5 (optimum, pH 5.5–6.0). They are sulfur-reducers.

=== Bacillota ===
Bacillota are mostly gram-positive bacteria with some gram-negative exceptions.

==== Ammonifex ====
These bacteria are gram-negative, extremely thermophilic, strictly anaerobic, faculatative chemolithoautotrophic. Type species: Ammonifex degensii.

==== Carboxydothermus ====
- Carboxydothermus pertinax differs from other members of its genus by its ability to grow chemolithoautotrophically with the reduction of elemental sulfur or thiosulfate coupled to CO oxidation. The other electron acceptor is ferric citrate, amorphous iron (III) oxide, 9,10-anthraquinone 2,6-disulfonate. Hydrogen is used as an energy source and CO_{2} as a carbon source. Cells are rod-shaped with peritrichous flagella and grow at 65 °C temperature.

=== Chrysiogenota ===
Chrysiogenota are gram-negative bacteria with curved, rod-shaped cells and a single polar flagellum. They are mesophilic and exhibit anaerobic respiration, in which arsenate serves as the electron acceptor. Strictly anaerobic, these bacteria are grown at 25–30 °C.

==== Desulfurispirillum spp. ====
Desulfurispirillum species are gram-negative, motile spirilla, obligately anaerobic with respiratory metabolism. Use elemental sulfur and nitrate as electron acceptors, and short-chain fatty acids and hydrogen as electron donors. Alkaliphilic and slightly halophilic.

- Desulfurispirillum alkaliphilum is obligate anaerobic and heterotrophic bacteria, motile by single bipolar flagella. It uses elemental sulfur, polysulfide, nitrate and fumarate as electron acceptors. The final products are sulfide and ammonium. Utilizes short-chain fatty acids and H_{2} as electron donor and carbon as source. It is moderately alkaliphilic with a pH range for growth between 8.0 and 10.2 and an optimum at pH 9.0 and slightly halophilic with a salt range from 0.1 to 2.5 M Na+. Mesophilic with a maximum temperature for growth at 45 and an optimum at 35 °C.

=== Spirochaetota ===
Spirochaetes are free-living, gram-negative, helical-shaped and motile bacteria, often protist or animal-associated. They are obligate and facultative anaerobes. Among this phylum, two species are recognized as sulfur-reducing bacteria, Spirochaeta perfilievii and Spirochaeta smaragdinae.

- Spirochaeta perfilievii are gram-negative, helical bacteria. Their size range is 10-200 μm. The shortest cells are those grown in extremely anaerobic environments. They are mesophilic with a temperature range 4–32 °C (optimum at 28–30 °C). Grows at pH 6.5–8.5 (optimum pH 7.0–7.5). Obligate, moderate halophile. Under anaerobic conditions, sulfur and thiosulfate are reduced to sulfide.
- Spirochaeta smaragdinae are gram-negative, chemoorganotrophic, obligately anaerobic and halophilic bacteria. They can reduce sulfur to sulfide. Their temperature range is from 20 to 40 °C (optimum 37 °C), their pH range varies from 5.5 to 8.0 (optimum 7.0).

=== Synergistota ===
==== Dethiosulfovibrio spp. ====
Dethiosulfovibrio are a gram-negative sulfur-reducing bacterium that was isolated from "Thiodendron", bacterial sulfur mats obtained from different saline environments. Cells are curved or fibroid-like rods and motile thanks to flagella located on the concave side of the cells. The temperature range is from 15° to 40 °C and at pH values between 5±5 and 8±0. Regarding their metabolism, they ferment proteins, peptides, and some organic acids, as well as amino acids such as serine, histidine, lysine, arginine, cysteine, and threonine. Only in the presence of sulfur or thiosulfate can the cells use alanine, glutamate, isoleucine, leucine, and valine; moreover, the presence of sulfur or thiosulfate increases cell yield and growth rate. They are obligately anaerobic and slightly halophilic. In the presence of fermentable substrates, they are able to reduce elemental sulfur and thiosulfate but not sulfate or sulfite to sulfide. Growth did not occur with H_{2} as electron donor and carbon dioxide or acetate as carbon sources in the presence of thiosulfate or elemental sulfur as electron acceptor. Unable to utilize carbohydrates, alcohols and some organic acids like acetate or succinate. Four species were found, Dethiosulfovibrio russensis, Dethiosulfovibrio marinus, Dethiosulfovibrio peptidovorans and Dethiosulfovibrio acidaminovorans.

==== Thermanaerovibrio spp. ====
Thermophilic and neutrophilic gram-negative bacteria. Motile thanks to lateral flagella, located on the concave side of the cell. Non-spore-forming. Multiplication occurs by binary fission. Strictly anaerobic with chemo-organotrophic growth on fermentable substrates or lithoheterotrophic growth with molecular hydrogen and elemental sulfur, reducing the sulfur to H_{2}S. Inhabits the granular methanogenic sludge and neutral hot springs. The type species is Thermanaerovibrio acidaminovorans.

- Thermanaerovibrio velox is gram-negative bacteria that was isolated from a thermophilic cyanobacterial mat from caldera Uzon, Kamchatka, Russia. The reproduction occurs by binary fission, and they do not form a spore. Growth temperature goes from 45° to 70°, and pH range from 4 to 8.

=== Thermotogota ===
Thermotoga spp. are gram-negative, rod-shaped, non-spore forming, hyperthermophilic microorganisms, given their name by the presence of a sheathlike envelope called “toga”. They are strictly anaerobes and fermenters, catabolizing sugars or starch and producing lactate, acetate, CO_{2}, and H_{2} as products, and can grow in a range temperature of 48–90 °C. High levels of H_{2} inhibit their growth, and they share many genetic similarities with Archaea, caused by horizontal gene transfer They are also able to perform anaerobic respiration using H_{2} as electron donor and usually Fe(III) as electron acceptor. Species belonging to the genus Thermotoga were found in terrestrial hot springs and marine hydrothermal vents. The species that are able to reduce sulfur do not show alterations in growth yield or the stoichiometry of organic products, and no ATP is produced. Furthermore, tolerance to H_{2} increases during sulfur reduction, allowing them to produce H_{2}S to overcome growth inhibition. The genome of Thermotoga spp. is widely used as a model for studying adaptation to high temperatures, microbial evolution and biotechnological opportunities, such as biohydrogen production and biocatalysis.

- Thermotoga maritima is the type species for the genus Thermotoga, growth is observed between 55 °C and 90 °C, the optimum is at 80 °C. Each cell presents a unique sheath- like structure and a monotrichous flagellum. It was first isolated from a geothermally heated, shallow marine sediment at Vulcano, in Italy.
- Thermotoga neapolitana is the second species isolated belonging to the genus Thermotoga. It was firstly found in a submarine thermal vent at Lucrino, near Naples, Italy, and has its optimum growth at 77 °C

== Ecology ==
Sulfur-reducing bacteria are mostly mesophilic and thermophilic. Growth has been observed between a temperature range 37-95 °C, however the optimum is different depending on the species (i.e. Thermotoga neapolitana optimum 77 °C, Nautilia lithotrophica optimum 53 °C). They have been reported in many different environments, such as anoxic marine sediments, brackish and freshwater sediments, anoxic muds, bovine rumen, hot waters from solfataras and volcanic areas. Many of these bacteria are found in hot vents, where elemental sulfur is an abundant sulfur species. This happens due to volcanic activity, during which hot vapours and elemental sulfur are released together through fractures in Earth's crust. The ability of using zero valence sulfur as both an electron donor or acceptor, allows Sulfurimonas spp. to spread widely among different habitats, from highly reducing to more oxidizing deep-sea environments. In some communities found in hydrothermal vents, their proliferation is enhanced thanks to the reactions carried out by thermophilic photo- or chemoautotrophs, in which there is simultaneously production of elemental sulfur and organic matter, respectively electron acceptor and energy source for sulfur-reducing bacteria. Sulfur reducers of hydrothermal vents can be free-living organisms, or endosymbionts of animals such as shrimps and tube worms.

=== Symbiosis ===
Thiodendron latens is a symbiotic association of aerotolerant spirochaetes and anaerobic sulfidogenes. The spirochaete species are the main structural and functional component of these mats, and they may accumulate elemental sulfur in the intracellular space. This association of micro-organisms inhabits sulfide-rich habitats, where the chemical oxidation of sulfide by oxygen, manganese or ferric iron or by the activity of sulfide-oxidizing bacteria results in the formation of thiosulfate or elemental sulfur. The partly oxidized sulfur compounds can be either completely oxidized to sulfate by sulfur-oxidizing bacteria, if enough oxygen is present, or reduced to sulfide by sulfidogenic bacteria. In such places, oxygen limitation is common, as indicated by micro-profile measurements. This relationship may represent an effective shortcut in the sulfur cycle.

=== Synthophy ===
Desulfuromonas acetooxidans is able to grow in cocultures with green sulfur bacteria such as Chlorobium (vibrioforme and phaeovibroides). The electron donor for the sulfur-reducing bacterium is acetate, which is coupled with the reduction of elemental sulfur to sulfide. The green sulfur bacterium produces H_{2} re-oxidizing the H_{2}S previously produced, in the presence of light. During these cocultures experiments, no elemental sulfur appears in the medium because it is immediately reduced.

=== Sulfur cycle ===
The sulfur cycle is one of the major biogeochemical processes. The majority of sulfur on Earth is present in sediments and rocks, but its quantity in the oceans represents the primary reservoir of sulfate of the entire biosphere. Human activities, such as burning fossil fuels, also contribute to the cycle by emitting significant amounts of sulfur dioxide into the atmosphere. The earliest life forms on Earth were sustained by sulfur metabolism, and the enormous diversity of present microorganisms is still supported by the sulfur cycle. It also interacts with numerous biogeochemical cycles of other elements such as carbon, oxygen, nitrogen and iron. Sulfur has diverse oxidation states ranging from +6 to −2, which permit to sulfur compounds to be used as electron donors and electron acceptors in numerous microbial metabolisms, which transform organic and inorganic sulfur compounds, contributing to physical, biological and chemical components of the biosphere.

The sulfur cycle follows several linked pathways.

Sulfate reduction

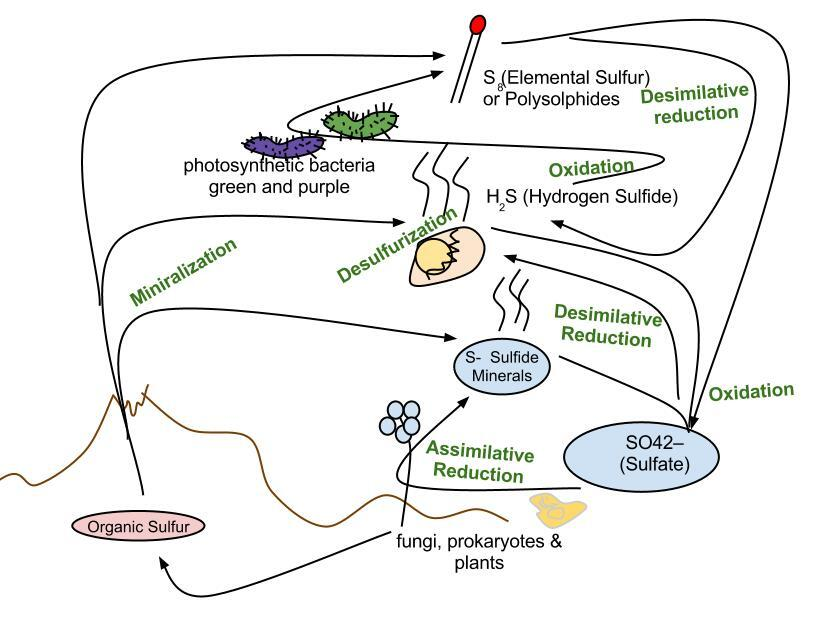
The sulfur cycle

Under anaerobic conditions, sulfate is reduced to sulfide by sulfate-reducing bacteria, such as Desulfovibrio and Desulfobacter.

SO^{2−}_{4} + 4 H_{2} → H_{2}S + 2 H_{2}O + 2 OH^{−}

Sulfide oxidation

Under aerobic conditions, sulfide is oxidized to sulfur and then sulfate by sulfur-oxidizing bacteria, such as Thiobacillus, Beggiatoa and many others. Under anaerobic conditions, sulfide can be oxidized to sulfur and then sulfate by purple and green sulfur bacteria.

H_{2}S → S^{0} → SO^{2−}_{4}

Sulfur oxidation

Sulfur can also be oxidized to sulfuric acid by chemolithotrophic bacteria, such as Thiobacillus and Acidithiobacillus.

S^{0} + 3/_{2} O_{2} + H_{2}O → H_{2}SO_{4}

Sulfur reduction

Some bacteria can reduce sulfur to sulfide, performing a form of anaerobic respiration. This process can be carried out by both sulfate-reducing bacteria and sulfur-reducing bacteria. Although they thrive in the same habitats, sulfur-reducing bacteria cannot reduce sulfate. Bacteria like Desulfuromonas acetoxidans are able to reduce sulfur at the cost of acetate. Some iron reducing bacteria reduce sulfur to generate ATP.

S^{0} + H_{2} → H_{2}S

These are the main inorganic processes involved in the sulfur cycle, but organic compounds can also contribute to it. The most abundant in nature is dimethyl sulfide (CH_{3}−S−CH_{3}) produced by the degradation of dimethylsulfoniopropionate. Many other organic S compounds affect the global sulfur cycle, including methanethiol, dimethyl disulfide, and carbon disulfide.

== Uses ==
Microorganisms with sulfur-based metabolism offer a significant opportunity for industrial processes, particularly those that perform sulfidogenesis (production of sulfide). For example, these bacteria can be used to generate hydrogen sulfide to enable selective precipitation and recovery of heavy metals in the metallurgical and mining industries.

=== Flue gases treatment ===
According to innovative Chinese research, the SCDD process used to desulfurize flue gases can be lowered in costs and environmental impact, using biological reduction of elemental sulfur to H_{2}S, which represents the reducing agent in this process. The electron donors would be organics from wastewater, such as acetate and glucose. The SCDD process, revisited in this way, would take three steps under specific conditions of pH, temperature, and reagent concentration. The first is where biological sulfur reduction occurs; the second is through which dissolved H_{2}S in wastewaters is stripped into hydrogen sulfide gas; and the third is the treatment of flue gases, removing over 90% of SO_{2} and NO, according to this study. Furthermore, the 88% of the sulfur input would be recovered as octasulfur and then reutilized, representing both a chemical-saving and a profitable solution.

=== Treatment of arsenic-contaminated waters ===
Sulfur-reducing bacteria can be used to remove arsenite from arsenic-contaminated waters, such as acid mine drainage (AMD) and metallurgical industry effluents, as well as soils and ground waters. The sulfidogenic process driven by sulfur-reducing bacteria (Desulfurella) takes place under acidic conditions and produces sulfide, with which arsenite precipitates. Microbial sulfur reduction also produces protons that lower the pH in arsenic-contaminated water and prevent the formation of thioarsenite by-product with sulfide.

$CH_3COOH + 4\ S^0 + 2\ H_2O \; \longrightarrow \; 4\ HS^- + 2\ CO_2 + 4\ H^+$

=== Treatment of mercury-contaminated waters ===
Wastewater from industries that produce chlor-alkali and batteries contains high levels of mercury ions, threatening aquatic ecosystems. Recent studies demonstrate that the sulfidogenic process by sulfur-reducing bacteria can be a good technology in the treatment of mercury-contaminated waters.
