= Pelobacter acidigallici =

Scientific classification
- Domain: Bacteria
- Kingdom: Pseudomonadati
- Phylum: Thermodesulfobacteriota
- Class: Desulfuromonadia
- Order: Desulfuromonadales
- Family: Geopsychrobacteraceae
- Genus: Pelobacter
- Species: P. acidigallici

Binomial name
- Pelobacter acidigallici Schink and Pfennig, 1983

Species of bacterium

Pelobacter acidigallici is the type species in the bacterial genus Pelobacter.

Pelobacter acidigallici is able to degrade trihydroxybenzenes. The enzyme pyrogallol hydroxytransferase uses 1,2,3,5-tetrahydroxybenzene and 1,2,3-trihydroxybenzene (pyrogallol), whereas its two products are 1,3,5-trihydroxybenzene (phloroglucinol) and 1,2,3,5-tetrahydroxybenzene. This enzyme can be found in P. acidigallici.
