= Diacetyl reductase ((S)-acetoin forming) =

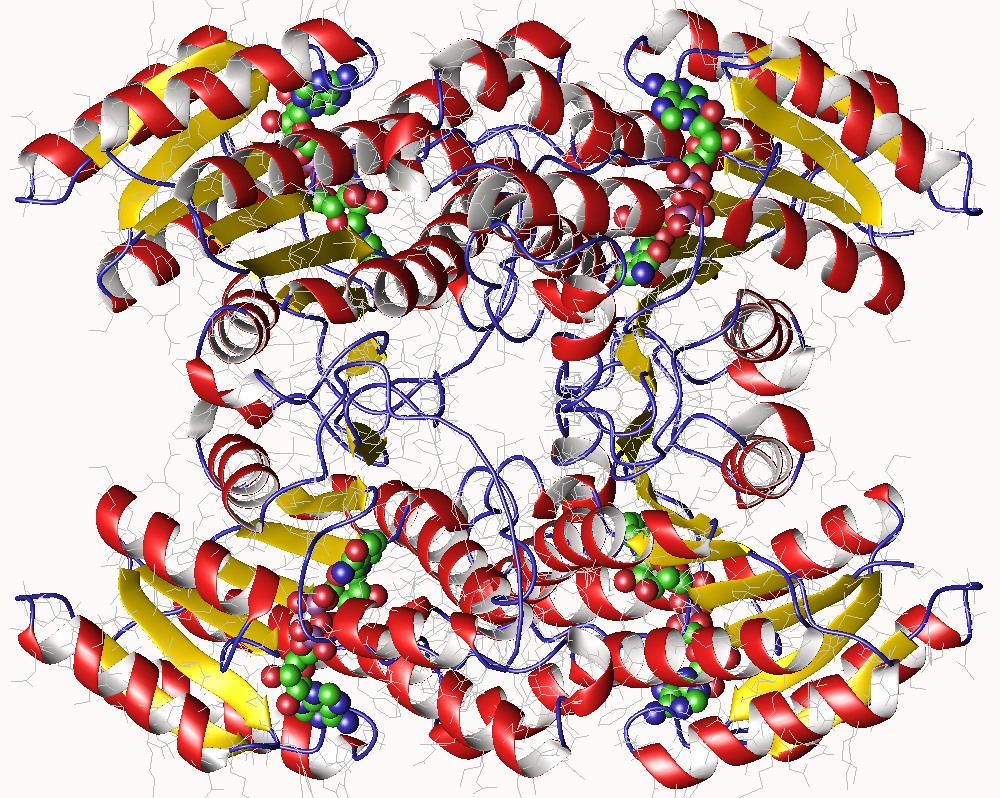

Identifiers
- EC no.: 1.1.1.304

Databases
- IntEnz: IntEnz view
- BRENDA: BRENDA entry
- ExPASy: NiceZyme view
- KEGG: KEGG entry
- MetaCyc: metabolic pathway
- PRIAM: profile
- PDB structures: RCSB PDB PDBe PDBsum
Search
- PMC: articles
- PubMed: articles
- NCBI: proteins

Diacetyl reductase ((S)-acetoin forming) (EC 1.1.1.304, (S)-acetoin dehydrogenase) is an enzyme with systematic name (S)-acetoin:NAD^{+} oxidoreductase. This enzyme catalyses the following chemical reaction:

(S)-acetoin
+ NAD^{+}
H^{+}
H^{+}
diacetyl
+ NADH

The reaction is catalysed in the reverse direction. This activity is usually associated with butanediol dehydrogenase activity (EC 1.1.1.4 or EC 1.1.1.76). While the butanediol dehydrogenase activity is reversible, diacetyl reductase activity is irreversible. This enzyme has been reported in the bacteria Geobacillus stearothermophilus, Enterobacter aerogenes and Klebsiella pneumoniae. Different from EC 1.1.1.303, diacetyl reductase ((R)-acetoin forming).
