= Pelobacter propionicus =

Scientific classification
- Domain: Bacteria
- Kingdom: Pseudomonadati
- Phylum: Thermodesulfobacteriota
- Class: Desulfuromonadia
- Order: Desulfuromonadales
- Family: Geopsychrobacteraceae
- Genus: Pelobacter
- Species: P. propionicus

Binomial name
- Pelobacter propionicus Schink 1984

Synonyms
- "Pseudopelobacter propionicus" (Schink 1984) Waite et al. 2020

Species of bacterium

Pelobacter propionicus is a species of bacteria that ferments 2,3-butanediol and acetoin. It is Gram-negative, 0.5-0.7x1.2-7 micrometers in size, strictly anaerobic and non-spore-forming. Ott Bd 1 is the type strain.
