= Anaerobic respiration =

Respiration using electron acceptors other than oxygen

Anaerobic respiration is respiration using inorganic electron acceptors other than molecular oxygen (O_{2}) in its electron transport chain. It differs from fermentation, a biochemical reaction which transfers electrons to organic compounds..

In aerobic organisms, electrons are shuttled to an electron transport chain, and the final electron acceptor is oxygen. Molecular oxygen is an excellent electron acceptor. Anaerobes instead use less-oxidizing (in either thermodynamic or kinetics sense) substances such as nitrate (NO^{−}_{3}), fumarate (C_{4}H_{2}O^{2−}_{4}), sulfate (SO^{2−}_{4}), or elemental sulfur (S), among others. These terminal electron acceptors have smaller reduction potentials than O_{2}. Less energy per oxidized molecule is released. Therefore, anaerobic respiration is less efficient than aerobic.

== As compared with fermentation ==
Anaerobic cellular respiration and fermentation generate ATP in very different ways, and the terms should not be treated as synonyms. Cellular respiration (both aerobic and anaerobic) uses highly reduced chemical compounds such as NADH and FADH_{2} (for example produced during glycolysis and the citric acid cycle) to establish an electrochemical gradient (often a proton gradient) across a membrane. This results in an electrical potential or ion concentration difference across the membrane. The reduced chemical compounds are oxidized by a series of respiratory integral membrane proteins with sequentially increasing reduction potentials, with the final electron acceptor being oxygen (in aerobic respiration) or another chemical substance (in anaerobic respiration). A proton motive force drives protons down the gradient (across the membrane) through the proton channel of ATP synthase. The resulting current drives ATP synthesis from ADP and inorganic phosphate.

Fermentation, in contrast, does not use an electrochemical gradient but instead uses only substrate-level phosphorylation to produce ATP. The electron acceptor NAD^{+} is regenerated from NADH formed in oxidative steps of the fermentation pathway by the reduction of oxidized compounds. These oxidized compounds are often formed during the fermentation pathway itself, but may also be external. For example, in homofermentative lactic acid bacteria, NADH formed during the oxidation of glyceraldehyde-3-phosphate is oxidized back to NAD^{+} by the reduction of pyruvate to lactic acid at a later stage in the pathway. In yeast, acetaldehyde is reduced to ethanol to regenerate NAD^{+}.

There are two important anaerobic microbial methane formation pathways, through carbon dioxide / bicarbonate (HCO^{−}_{3}) reduction (respiration) or acetate fermentation.

== Ecological importance ==
Anaerobic respiration is a critical component of the global nitrogen, iron, sulfur, and carbon cycles through the reduction of the oxyanions of nitrogen, sulfur, and carbon to more-reduced compounds. The biogeochemical cycling of these compounds, which depends upon anaerobic respiration, significantly impacts the carbon cycle and global warming. Anaerobic respiration occurs in many environments, including freshwater and marine sediments, soil, subsurface aquifers, deep subsurface environments, and biofilms. Even environments that contain oxygen, such as soil, have micro-environments that lack oxygen due to the slow diffusion characteristics of oxygen gas.

An example of the ecological importance of anaerobic respiration is the use of nitrate as a terminal electron acceptor, or dissimilatory denitrification, which is the main route by which fixed nitrogen is returned to the atmosphere as molecular nitrogen gas. The denitrification process is also very important in host-microbe interactions. Like mitochondria in oxygen-respiring microorganisms, some single-cellular anaerobic ciliates use denitrifying endosymbionts to gain energy. Another example is methanogenesis, a form of carbon-dioxide respiration, that is used to produce methane gas by anaerobic digestion. Biogenic methane can be a sustainable alternative to fossil fuels. However, uncontrolled methanogenesis in landfill sites releases large amounts of methane into the atmosphere, acting as a potent greenhouse gas. Sulfate respiration produces hydrogen sulfide, which is responsible for the characteristic 'rotten egg' smell of coastal wetlands and has the capacity to precipitate heavy metal ions from solution, leading to the deposition of sulfidic metal ores.

== Applications ==
Anaerobic Denitrification (ETC System) The model above shows the process of anaerobic respiration through denitrification, which uses nitrogen (in the form of nitrate, NO^{−}_{3}) as the electron acceptor. NO^{−}_{3} goes through respiratory dehydrogenase and reduces through each step from the ubiquinose through the bc1 complex through the ATP synthase protein as well. Each reductase removes oxygen step by step so that the final product of anaerobic respiration is N_{2}.: 1. Cytoplasm; 2. Periplasm Compare to the aerobic electron transport chain.

Dissimilatory denitrification is widely used in the removal of nitrate and nitrite from municipal wastewater. An excess of nitrate can lead to eutrophication of waterways into which treated water is released. Elevated nitrite levels in drinking water can lead to problems due to its toxicity. Denitrification converts both compounds into harmless nitrogen gas.

Specific types of anaerobic respiration are also critical in bioremediation, which uses microorganisms to convert toxic chemicals into less-harmful molecules to clean up contaminated beaches, aquifers, lakes, and oceans. For example, toxic arsenate or selenate can be reduced to less toxic compounds by various anaerobic bacteria via anaerobic respiration. The reduction of chlorinated chemical pollutants, such as vinyl chloride and carbon tetrachloride, also occurs through anaerobic respiration.

Anaerobic respiration is useful in generating electricity in microbial fuel cells, which employ bacteria that respire solid electron acceptors (such as oxidized iron) to transfer electrons from reduced compounds to an electrode. This process can simultaneously degrade organic carbon waste and generate electricity.

== Examples of electron acceptors in respiration ==
Type	Lifestyle	Electron acceptor	Products	E^{o′} (V)	Example organisms
Aerobic respiration	Obligate aerobes and facultative anaerobes	O_{2}	H_{2}O	+0.82	Aerobic organisms such as Escherichia coli
(Per)chlorate respiration	Facultative anaerobes	ClO^{−}_{4}, ClO^{−}_{3}	H_{2}O, O_{2}, Cl^{−}	+0.797	Azospira suillum, Sedimenticola selenatireducens, Sedimenticola thiotaurini, and other gram negative prokaryotes
Iodate respiration	Facultative anaerobes	IO^{−}_{3}	H_{2}O, H_{2}O_{2}, I^{−}	+0.72	Denitromonas, Azoarcus, Pseudomonas, and other prokaryotes
Iron reduction (Dissimilatory iron reducing bacteria)	Facultative anaerobes and obligate anaerobes	Fe^{3+}	Fe^{2+}	+0.75	Organisms within the order Desulfuromonadales (such as Geobacter, Geothermobacter, Geopsychrobacter, Pelobacter) and Shewanella species
Manganese reduction (dissimilatory metal-reducing microorganisms)	Facultative anaerobes and obligate anaerobes	Mn^{4+}	Mn^{2+}		Desulfuromonadales and Shewanella species
Cobalt reduction (dissimilatory metal-reducing microorganisms)	Facultative anaerobes and obligate anaerobes	Co^{3+}	Co^{2+}		Geobacter sulfurreducens
Uranium reduction (dissimilatory metal-reducing microorganisms)	Facultative anaerobes and obligate anaerobes	U^{6+}	U^{4+}		Geobacter metallireducens, Shewanella oneidensis
Denitrification (nitrate reduction)	Facultative anaerobes	NO^{−}_{3}	(Ultimately) N_{2}	+0.40	Paracoccus denitrificans, Escherichia coli
Fumarate respiration	Facultative anaerobes	Fumarate	Succinate	+0.03	Escherichia coli
Sulfate respiration	Obligate anaerobes	SO^{2−}_{4}	H_{2}O, HS^{−}	−0.22	Many Deltaproteobacteria species in the orders Desulfobacterales, Desulfovibrionales, and Syntrophobacterales
Methanogenesis (carbon dioxide reduction)	Methanogens	CO_{2}	CH_{4}	−0.25	Methanosarcina barkeri
Sulfur respiration (sulfur reduction)	Facultative anaerobes and obligate anaerobes	S^{0}	HS^{−}	−0.27	Desulfuromonadales
Acetogenesis (carbon dioxide reduction)	Obligate anaerobes	CO_{2}	Acetate	−0.30	Acetobacterium woodii
Halorespiration	Facultative anaerobes and obligate anaerobes	Halogenated organic compounds (R−X)	Halide ions, dehalogenated compounds (X^{−} + R−H)	+0.25 – +0.60	Dehalococcoides and Dehalobacter species

== See also ==
- Hydrogenosomes and mitosomes – mitochondrion-related organelles (MROs)
- Spinoloricus cinziae – an anaerobic microbial animal with hydrogenosome-like organelles
- Monocercomonoides – genus of eukaryotes that lack mitochondria and MROs entirely
- Anaerobic digestion
- Microbial fuel cell
- Standard electrode potential (data page)
- Table of standard reduction potentials for half-reactions important in biochemistry
- Lithotrophs
