= Desulfuromonas svalbardensis =

Scientific classification
- Domain: Bacteria
- Kingdom: Pseudomonadati
- Phylum: Thermodesulfobacteriota
- Class: Desulfuromonadia
- Order: Desulfuromonadales
- Family: Desulfuromonadaceae
- Genus: Desulfuromonas
- Species: D. svalbardensis

Binomial name
- Desulfuromonas svalbardensis Vandieken et al. 2006

Species of bacterium

Desulfuromonas svalbardensis is a species of psychrophilic, Fe(III)-reducing bacteria. It is Gram-negative, rod-shaped and motile. Its type strain is 112^{T} (=DSM 16958^{T} =JCM 12927^{T}) .
