= Pelobacter venetianus =

Scientific classification
- Domain: Bacteria
- Kingdom: Pseudomonadati
- Phylum: Thermodesulfobacteriota
- Class: Desulfuromonadia
- Order: Desulfuromonadales
- Family: Geopsychrobacteraceae
- Genus: Pelobacter
- Species: P. venetianus

Binomial name
- Pelobacter venetianus Schink & Stieb 1983

Synonyms
- Syntrophotalea venetiana (Schink & Stieb 1984) Waite et al. 2020

Species of bacterium

Pelobacter venetianus is a species of bacteria that degrade polyethylene glycol. It is strictly anaerobic, Gram-negative, and nonspore-forming.
