= Desulfuromonas michiganensis =

Scientific classification
- Domain: Bacteria
- Kingdom: Pseudomonadati
- Phylum: Thermodesulfobacteriota
- Class: Desulfuromonadia
- Order: Desulfuromonadales
- Family: Desulfuromonadaceae
- Genus: Desulfuromonas
- Species: D. michiganensis

Binomial name
- Desulfuromonas michiganensis Sung et al. 2009

Synonyms
- "Trichloromonas michiganensis" (Sung et al. 2009) Waite et al. 2020

Species of bacterium

Desulfuromonas michiganensis is a species of tetrachloroethene-reducing, acetate-oxidizing anaerobic bacteria.
