= Acetoin dehydrogenase =

Class of enzymes

Identifiers
- EC no.: 2.3.1.190

Databases
- IntEnz: IntEnz view
- BRENDA: BRENDA entry
- ExPASy: NiceZyme view
- KEGG: KEGG entry
- MetaCyc: metabolic pathway
- PRIAM: profile
- PDB structures: RCSB PDB PDBe PDBsum
Search
- PMC: articles
- PubMed: articles
- NCBI: proteins

Acetoin dehydrogenase (EC 2.3.1.190, acetoin dehydrogenase complex, acetoin dehydrogenase enzyme system, AoDH ES) is an enzyme with systematic name acetyl-CoA:acetoin O-acetyltransferase. This enzyme catalyses the following chemical reaction

acetoin
+ coenzyme A + NAD^{+}
H^{+}
acetaldehyde
+
acetyl-CoA
+ NADH

This enzyme requires thiamine diphosphate and is involved in the catabolism of acetoin. It is widely present in bacteria and has been characterised from Alcaligenes eutrophus, Pelobacter carbinolicus, Clostridium magnum, Pseudomonas putida, and Bacillus subtilis.

== See also ==
- Diacetyl reductase
