= Pelobacter acetylenicus =

Scientific classification
- Domain: Bacteria
- Kingdom: Pseudomonadati
- Phylum: Thermodesulfobacteriota
- Class: Desulfuromonadia
- Order: Desulfuromonadales
- Family: Geopsychrobacteraceae
- Genus: Pelobacter
- Species: P. acetylenicus

Binomial name
- Pelobacter acetylenicus Schink 1986

Synonyms
- Syntrophotalea acetylenica (Schink 1986) Waite et al. 2020

Species of bacterium

Pelobacter acetylenicus is a strictly anaerobic Gram-negative rod-shaped non-sporeforming bacterium of the genus Pelobacter. It was isolated from marine and freshwater sediments and can use acetylene (ethyne) as its sole source of carbon and energy.

== Metabolism ==
Pelobacter acetylenicus can grow on acetylene, acetoin, ethanolamine, choline, propylene glycol (1,2-propanediol), or glycerol, although the latter two support growth only in the presence of small amounts of acetate. P. acetylenicus ferments substrates by disproportionation to acetate and ethanol or the respective higher acids and alcohols.

== Genome ==
The genomes of several strains have been sequenced. The genome of P. acetylenicus strain DSM 3247 was assembled into a 3,176,363-bp circular chromosome while strain DSM 3246 has a circular chromosome of 3,192,352-bp. Annotation of DSM 3246 identified 2,774 protein-coding genes, 16 rRNAs, 53 tRNAs, five noncoding RNAs, and 132 pseudogenes. DSM 3247 encodes 2,805 proteins, nine rRNAs, 51 tRNAs, five noncoding RNAs, and 44 pseudogenes.
