= Diacetyl reductase =

Diacetyl reductase is the name of two acetoin forming enzymes:

- Diacetyl reductase ((R)-acetoin forming)
- Diacetyl reductase ((S)-acetoin forming)

== See also ==
- Acetoin dehydrogenase
