= Desulfuromonas chloroethenica =

Scientific classification
- Domain: Bacteria
- Kingdom: Pseudomonadati
- Phylum: Thermodesulfobacteriota
- Class: Desulfuromonadia
- Order: Desulfuromonadales
- Family: Desulfuromonadaceae
- Genus: Desulfuromonas
- Species: D. chloroethenica

Binomial name
- Desulfuromonas chloroethenica Krumholz 1997

Synonyms
- "Trichloromonas chloroethenica" (Krumholz 1997) Waite et al. 2020

Species of bacterium

Desulfuromonas chloroethenica is a gram-negative metal-reducing proteobacterium. It uses tetrachloroethylene and trichloroethylene as electron acceptors.
