= Aerobicity =

Aerobicity may refer to:

- Aerobic respiration
- Anaerobic respiration
