= Pelobacter carbinolicus =

Scientific classification
- Domain: Bacteria
- Kingdom: Pseudomonadati
- Phylum: Thermodesulfobacteriota
- Class: Desulfuromonadia
- Order: Desulfuromonadales
- Family: Geopsychrobacteraceae
- Genus: Pelobacter
- Species: P. carbinolicus

Binomial name
- Pelobacter carbinolicus Schink 1984

Synonyms
- Syntrophotalea carbinolica (Schink 1984) Waite et al. 2020

Species of bacterium

Pelobacter carbinolicus is a species of bacteria that ferments 2,3-butanediol and acetoin. It is Gram-negative, strictly anaerobic and non-spore-forming. Gra Bd 1 is the type strain. Its genome has been sequenced.
