= Desulfuromonadaceae =

Scientific classification
- Domain: Bacteria
- Kingdom: Pseudomonadati
- Phylum: Proteobacteria
- Class: Desulfuromonadia
- Order: Desulfuromonadales
- Family: Desulfuromonadaceae corrig. Kuever et al. 2006

Genera
- Desulfuromonas; "Pseudodesulfuromonas"

Family of bacteria

Desulfuromonadaceae is a family of bacteria in the phylum Thermodesulfobacteriota.

== Phylogeny ==
The currently accepted taxonomy is based on the List of Prokaryotic names with Standing in Nomenclature (LPSN) and National Center for Biotechnology Information (NCBI).

16S rRNA based LTP_10_2024

- - - Desulfuromonadaceae
      Desulfuromonas Pfennig and Biebl 1977
      [incl. "Pseudodesulfuromonas"]
  - - Geothermobacteraceae
      Geothermobacter Kashefi et al. 2005
    - Geopsychrobacteraceae
      - - Desulfuromusa ferrireducens Vandieken et al. 2006
        - Malonomonas Dehning and Schink 1990
      - - Geopsychrobacter Holmes et al. 2005
        - - Pelovirga Khomyakova et al. 2023
          - - Desulfuromusa Liesack & Finster 1994
            - - Seleniibacterium Waite et al. 2020
              - Pelobacter Schink & Pfennig 1983

120 marker proteins based GTDB 10-RS226

- - - Geothermobacteraceae
      Geothermobacter
  - - Desulfuromonadaceae
      - "Pseudodesulfuromonas" Waite et al. 2020
      - Desulfuromonas
    - Geopsychrobacteraceae
      - Geopsychrobacter
      - - Malonomonas
        - - - Pelovirga
            - Seleniibacterium
          - Desulfuromusa

== See also ==
- List of bacterial orders
- List of bacteria genera
