= Norbert Pfennig =

German microbiologist

Norbert Pfennig (born 8 July 1925 in Kassel — died 11 February 2008 in Überlingen) was a German microbiologist.

Norbert Pfennig was a trained chemist who studied at the University of Goettingen (Universität Göttingen) in Germany, where he did his PhD on the topic of chromatography. He then worked as assistant professor at the Institute of Microbiology of the university, which at that time was specialized on agriculturally relevant bacteria. Pfennig became an expert for microorganisms with newly detected metabolisms, particular for green and purple sulfur bacteria. His peers were, among others, August Rippel and Hans Günter Schlegel in Germany and C. B. van Niel in the USA. Pfennig and Schlegel took the initiative of establishing the German Collection of Microorganisms (today's DSMZ) that was officially founded in 1970. Internationally, Pfennig was widely known as cultivation expert and taxonomic specialist for sulfur bacteria for which he was awarded the Bergey Medal (1992). In the same year, he also became honorary professor of Universität Bonn. In 1979/1980, Pfennig became Full Professor at Universität Konstanz at Lake Constance and appointed for the field of limnology, researching plankton and bacteria. Many of his scholars became professors, e.g. Hans G. Trüper and Jörg Overmann. Pfennig described with Bernhard Schink Pelobacter acidigallici, a bacterial species in the genus Pelobacter. P. acidigallici is able to degrade trihydroxybenzenes.

In his private life, Pfennig was a strong believer in anthroposophy and also taught anthroposophic chemistry at the Goetheanum in Dornach. Pfennig and his wife Helga had five children.
