= Geoalkalibacter subterraneus =

Scientific classification
- Domain: Bacteria
- Kingdom: Pseudomonadati
- Phylum: Thermodesulfobacteriota
- Class: Desulfuromonadia
- Order: Desulfuromonadales
- Family: Geoalkalibacteraceae
- Genus: Geoalkalibacter
- Species: G. subterraneus

Binomial name
- Geoalkalibacter subterraneus Greene et al. 2009

Type strain
- DSM 23483, JCM 15104, KCTC 5626, Red1

Species of bacterium

Geoalkalibacter subterraneus is a Fe(III)-reducing, Mn(IV)-reducing, strictly anaerobic, bacterium from the genus Geoalkalibacter which has been isolated from the water from the Redwash oilfield from Redwash in the United States.
