= Trihydroxybenzenes =

The trihydroxybenzenes (or benzenetriols) are organic compounds with the formula C_{6}H_{3}(OH)_{3}. Also classified as polyphenols, they feature three hydroxyl groups substituted onto a benzene ring. They are white solids with modest solubility in water.

Pyrogallol	Hydroxyquinol	Phloroglucinol
Benzene-1,2,3-triol	Benzene-1,2,4-triol	Benzene-1,3,5-triol

== In biochemistry ==
The enzyme pyrogallol hydroxytransferase transforms benzene-1,2,3-triol (pyrogallol) into benzene-1,3,5-triol (phloroglucinol) and vice versa. It uses benzene-1,2,3,5-tetrol as a cosubstrate, thanks to which it achieves a non-redox transhydroxylation. This enzyme can be found in Pelobacter acidigallici.

== See also ==
- Dihydroxybenzenes
- Tetrahydroxybenzenes
- Pentahydroxybenzene
- Hexahydroxybenzene
