= Tetrahydroxybenzenes =

Tetrahydroxybenzenes or Benzenetetrols are a group of organic compounds which are tetrahydroxy derivatives of benzene. Tetrahydroxybenzene comes in three isomers:

- 1,2,3,4-Tetrahydroxybenzene
- 1,2,3,5-Tetrahydroxybenzene
- 1,2,4,5-Tetrahydroxybenzene.

| Systematic Name | 1,2,3,4-Tetrahydroxybenzene | 1,2,3,5-Tetrahydroxybenzene | 1,2,4,5-Tetrahydroxybenzene |
| Structural Formula | | | |
| CAS Registry Number | 642-96-6 | 634-94-6 | 636-32-8 |

All isomers share the molecular weight 142.11 g/mol and the chemical formula C_{6}H_{6}O_{4}.

== See also ==
- Dihydroxybenzenes
- Trihydroxybenzenes
- Pentahydroxybenzene
- Hexahydroxybenzene
