= Dihydroxybenzenes =

Chemical compound

In organic chemistry, dihydroxybenzenes (benzenediols) are organic compounds in which two hydroxyl groups (−OH) are substituted onto a benzene ring (C_{6}H_{6}). These aromatic compounds are classed as phenols. There are three structural isomers: 1,2-dihydroxybenzene (the ortho isomer) is commonly known as catechol, 1,3-dihydroxybenzene (the meta isomer) is commonly known as resorcinol, and 1,4-dihydroxybenzene (the para isomer) is commonly known as hydroquinone.

Isomer	ortho	meta	para
Trivial name	Catechol	Resorcinol	Hydroquinone
IUPAC name	benzene-1,2-diol	benzene-1,3-diol	benzene-1,4-diol
Other names	pyrocatechol 1,2-dihydroxybenzene o-dihydroxybenzene o-benzenediol	resorcin 1,3-dihydroxybenzene m-dihydroxybenzene m-benzenediol	1,4-dihydroxybenzene p-dihydroxybenzene p-benzenediol
Structure			

All three of these compounds are colorless to white granular solids at room temperature and pressure, but upon exposure to oxygen they may darken. All three isomers have the chemical formula C_{6}H_{6}O_{2}.

Similar to other phenols, the hydroxyl groups on the aromatic ring of a benzenediol are weakly acidic. Each benzenediol can lose an H^{+} from one of the hydroxyls to form a type of phenolate ion.

The Dakin oxidation is an organic redox reaction in which an ortho- or para-hydroxylated phenyl aldehyde (−CH=O) or ketone (>C=O) reacts with hydrogen peroxide in base to form a benzenediol and a carboxylate. Overall, the carbonyl group (C=O) is oxidized, and the hydrogen peroxide is reduced.

== See also ==
- Trihydroxybenzenes
- Tetrahydroxybenzenes
- Pentahydroxybenzene
- Hexahydroxybenzene
- Methylbenzenediols (dihydroxytoluenes)
  - 3-Methylcatechol (3-methylbenzene-1,2-diol)
  - 4-Methylcatechol (4-methylbenzene-1,2-diol)
  - Orcinol (5-methylbenzene-1,3-diol)
- Methoxyphenols — can be derived from benzenediols by O-methylation
  - Guaiacol (2-methoxyphenol, O-Methylcatechol)
  - Mequinol (4-Methoxyphenol)
- Dimethoxybenzenes — can be derived from benzenediols by two rounds of O-methylation
  - Veratrole (1,2-Dimethoxybenzene)
  - 1,3-Dimethoxybenzene
  - 1,4-Dimethoxybenzene
