= Acetylene hydratase =

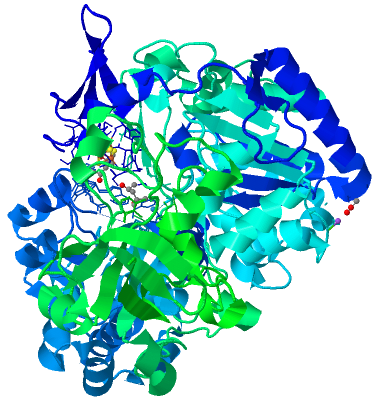
Overall structure of the [4FE-4S] cluster and the tungstoenzyme encompassed in the protein; the protein backbone is dark blue at the N-terminal end and green at the C-terminal end.

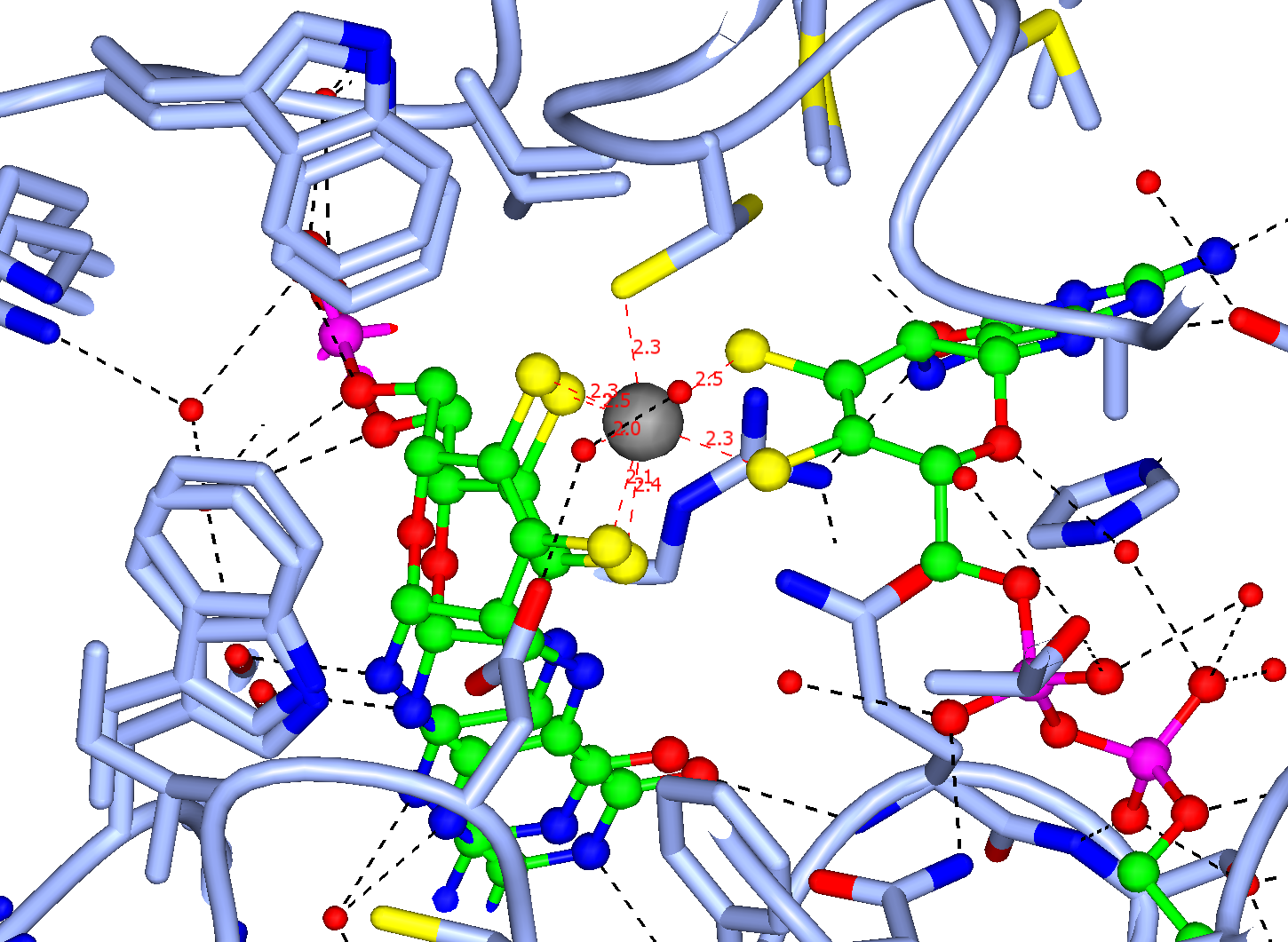
grey = W, yellow = sulfur, red = O, blue = N. The octahedral active site of the tungstoenzyme coordinated by two molybdopterin co-factors, Cys141 and a water molecule. The active site residues are Asp13 and Cys12.

Acetylene hydratase (EC 4.2.1.112, AH) is a bacterial enzyme, originally discovered in the anaerobic microorganism Pelobactor acetylenicus, that catalyzes the non-redox hydration of acetylene to form acetaldehyde.

C_{2}H_{2} + H_{2}O → CH_{3}CHO

The mechanism is thought to involve attachment of acetylene to the metal followed by nucleophilic attack of water. Because acetylene binding to the Mo in nitrogenase lends some support that the mechanism involves a Mo→CH2=CH2 bond. Acetylene inhibits several microbial transformations where it interacts with the active site of the metal-dependent enzymes including hydrogenase and nitrogenase. This enzyme relies on tungsten as the metal center and is the heaviest metal that plays a prominent part in the nitrogen, sulfur and carbon metabolic processes. The [4Fe-4S] cubane keeps the W in the reduced W(IV) state, the most stable reduced oxidation state, while W(VI) is the other stable oxidation state (2nd and 3rd row transition metals are usually most stable in their highest oxidation state). Mo and W enzymes ubiquitously involve W(IV)/W(VI) in the catalysis, however AH is unique since the tungstoenzyme stays as W(IV) in the catalysis. The tungstoenzyme stays as W(IV) throughout the catalysis because the enzyme catalyzes a non-redox reaction described as the hydration of acetylene to acetaldehyde. The active site tungsten has a distorted octahedral geometry that is coordinated by molybdopterin co-factors along with a cysteine residue coordinated by a water molecule as the sixth ligand. The active site residues are Asp13, Cys12, Trp179, Arg606, Met140 and Ile142. Asp13 plays an important role in assisting the catalysis where the active site residue deprotonates the water hydroxide making it a better nucleophile.
