= Desulfuromonas acetoxidans =

Scientific classification
- Domain: Bacteria
- Kingdom: Pseudomonadati
- Phylum: Thermodesulfobacteriota
- Class: Desulfuromonadia
- Order: Desulfuromonadales
- Family: Desulfuromonadaceae
- Genus: Desulfuromonas
- Species: D. acetoxidans

Binomial name
- Desulfuromonas acetoxidans Pfennig & Biebl, 1976

Species of bacterium

Desulfuromonas acetoxidans is a species of bacteria. It is strictly anaerobic, rod-shaped, laterally flagellated and Gram-negative. It is unable to ferment organic substances; it obtains energy for growth by anaerobic sulfur respiration.
