= Geoalkalibacter ferrihydriticus =

Scientific classification
- Domain: Bacteria
- Kingdom: Pseudomonadati
- Phylum: Thermodesulfobacteriota
- Class: Desulfuromonadia
- Order: Desulfuromonadales
- Family: Geoalkalibacteraceae
- Genus: Geoalkalibacter
- Species: G. ferrihydriticus

Binomial name
- Geoalkalibacter ferrihydriticus Zavarzina et al. 2007

Type strain
- DSM 17813, VKM B-2401, VKMB-2401, Z-0531

Synonyms
- Desulfuromonas alkaliphilus

Species of bacterium

Geoalkalibacter ferrihydriticus is a Gram-negative, obligately anaerobic, non-spore-forming, iron-reducting bacterium from the genus Geoalkalibacter which has been isolated from sediments from the Lake Khadin in Russia.
