= Desulfuromonas =

Scientific classification
- Domain: Bacteria
- Kingdom: Pseudomonadati
- Phylum: Thermodesulfobacteriota
- Class: Desulfuromonadia
- Order: Desulfuromonadales
- Family: Desulfuromonadaceae
- Genus: Desulfuromonas; Pfennig & Biebl 1977

Type species
- Desulfuromonas acetoxidans Pfennig & Biebl 1977

Species
- D. acetexigens; D. acetoxidans; D. carbonis; D. chloroethenica; D. michiganensis; D. palmitatis; D. svalbardensis; D. thiophila

Genus of bacteria

Desulfuromonas is a Gram negative bacterial genus from the family Desulfuromonadaceae. Desulfuromonas can reduce elemental sulfur to H_{2}S. Desulfuromonas occur in anoxic sediments and saline lakes.

== Phylogeny ==
The currently accepted taxonomy is based on the List of Prokaryotic names with Standing in Nomenclature (LPSN) and National Center for Biotechnology Information (NCBI).

16S rRNA based LTP_10_2024

- Desulfuromonas species‑group 2
  - Desulfuromonas carbonis An & Picardal 2015
  - - Desulfuromonas acetexigens Finster et al. 1994
    - - Desulfuromonas chloroethenica Krumholz 1997
      - Desulfuromonas michiganensis Sung et al. 2009

- Desulfuromonas
  - D. thiophila Finster et al. 1997
  - - D. acetoxidans Pfennig & Biebl 1977
    - D. svalbardensis Vandieken et al. 2006

120 marker proteins based GTDB 10-RS226

- NIT‑T3
  "Desulfuromonas versatilis" Xie et al. 2021

- "Trichloromonadaceae"
  Trichloromonas acetexigens ((Finster et al. 1997) Waite et al. 2025

- Desulfuromonadaceae
  - "Pseudodesulfuromonas thiophila" (Finster et al. 1997) Waite et al. 2020
  - Desulfuromonas acetoxidans Pfennig & Biebl 1977

== See also ==
- List of bacterial orders
- List of bacteria genera
