= 5-Ethyl-2-methylpyridine =

Names
- Preferred IUPAC name 5-Ethyl-2-methylpyridine
- Other names aldehyde-collidine, MEP, 5-Ethyl-2-picoline

Identifiers
CAS Number	104-90-5
3D model (JSmol)	Interactive image
Beilstein Reference	109269
ChEMBL	ChEMBL227181
ChemSpider	21105900
ECHA InfoCard	100.002.955
EC Number	203-250-0
PubChem CID	7728
RTECS number	TJ6825000
UNII	WG205CGK3Y
UN number	2300
CompTox Dashboard (EPA)	DTXSID7021861
- InChI: InChI=1S/C8H11N/c1-3-8-5-4-7(2)9-6-8/h4-6H,3H2,1-2H3 Key: NTSLROIKFLNUIJ-UHFFFAOYSA-N
- SMILES: CCC1=CN=C(C=C1)C

Properties
Chemical formula	C_{8}H_{11}N
Molar mass	121.183 g·mol^{−1}
Appearance	colorless liquid
Density	0.9208 g/cm^{3}
Melting point	−70.3 °C (−94.5 °F; 202.8 K)
Boiling point	178 °C (352 °F; 451 K)
Solubility in water	1.2g/100 mL

Hazards
- GHS labelling
Pictograms	(GHS05: Corrosive) (GHS06: Toxic) (GHS07: Exclamation mark)
Signal word	Danger
Hazard statements	H302, H311, H314, H315, H317, H319, H331, H412
Precautionary statements	P260, P264, P270, P271, P272, P273, P280, P301+P312, P301+P330+P331, P302+P352, P303+P361+P353, P304+P340, P305+P351+P338, P310, P311, P312, P321, P322, P330, P332+P313, P333+P313, P337+P313, P361, P362, P363, P403+P233, P405, P501
- Except where otherwise noted, data are given for materials in their standard state (at 25 °C [77 °F], 100 kPa). Infobox references

5-Ethyl-2-methylpyridine is an organic compound with the formula (C_{2}H_{5})(CH_{3})C_{5}H_{3}N. One of several isomeric pyridines with this formula, this derivative is of interest because it is efficiently prepared from simple reagents and it is a convenient precursor to nicotinic acid, a form of vitamin B_{3}. 5-Ethyl-2-methylpyridine is a colorless liquid.

== Synthesis and reactions ==
5-Ethyl-2-methylpyridine is produced by condensation of paraldehyde (a derivative of acetaldehyde) and ammonia:

4 CH_{3}CHO + NH_{3} → (C_{2}H_{5})(CH_{3})C_{5}H_{3}N + 4 H_{2}O

The conversion is an example of a structurally complex compound efficiently made from simple precursors. Under related conditions, the condensation of acetaldehyde and ammonia delivers 2-picoline.

Oxidation of 5-ethyl-2-methylpyridine with nitric acid gives nicotinic acid via the decarboxylation of 2,5-pyridinedicarboxylic acid.

== Toxicity ==
Like most alkylpyridines, the LD_{50} of 5-ethyl-2-methylpyridine is modest, being 368 mg/kg (oral, rat).
