= Desulfuromusa =

Scientific classification
- Domain: Bacteria
- Kingdom: Pseudomonadati
- Phylum: Thermodesulfobacteriota
- Class: Desulfuromonadia
- Order: Desulfuromonadales
- Family: Desulfuromonadaceae
- Genus: Desulfuromusa; Liesack and Finster 1994

Type species
- Desulfuromusa kysingii Liesack & Finster 1994

Species
- D. bakii; D. ferrireducens; D. kysingii; D. succinoxidans

Genus of bacterium

Desulfuromusa is a genus of bacteria containing four species.

== Phylogeny ==
The currently accepted taxonomy is based on the List of Prokaryotic names with Standing in Nomenclature (LPSN) and National Center for Biotechnology Information (NCBI).

16S rRNA based LTP_10_2024

- Desulfuromusa ferrireducens Vandieken et al. 2006

- Desulfuromusa
  - D. succinoxidans Liesack and Finster 1994
  - - D. bakii Liesack and Finster 1994
    - D. kysingii Liesack and Finster 1994

120 marker proteins based GTDB 10-RS226

- Desulfuromusa
  D. kysingii

== See also ==
- List of bacterial orders
- List of bacteria genera
