= 1,2,3,5-Tetrahydroxybenzene =

Chemical structure of 1,2,3,5-tetrahydroxybenzene
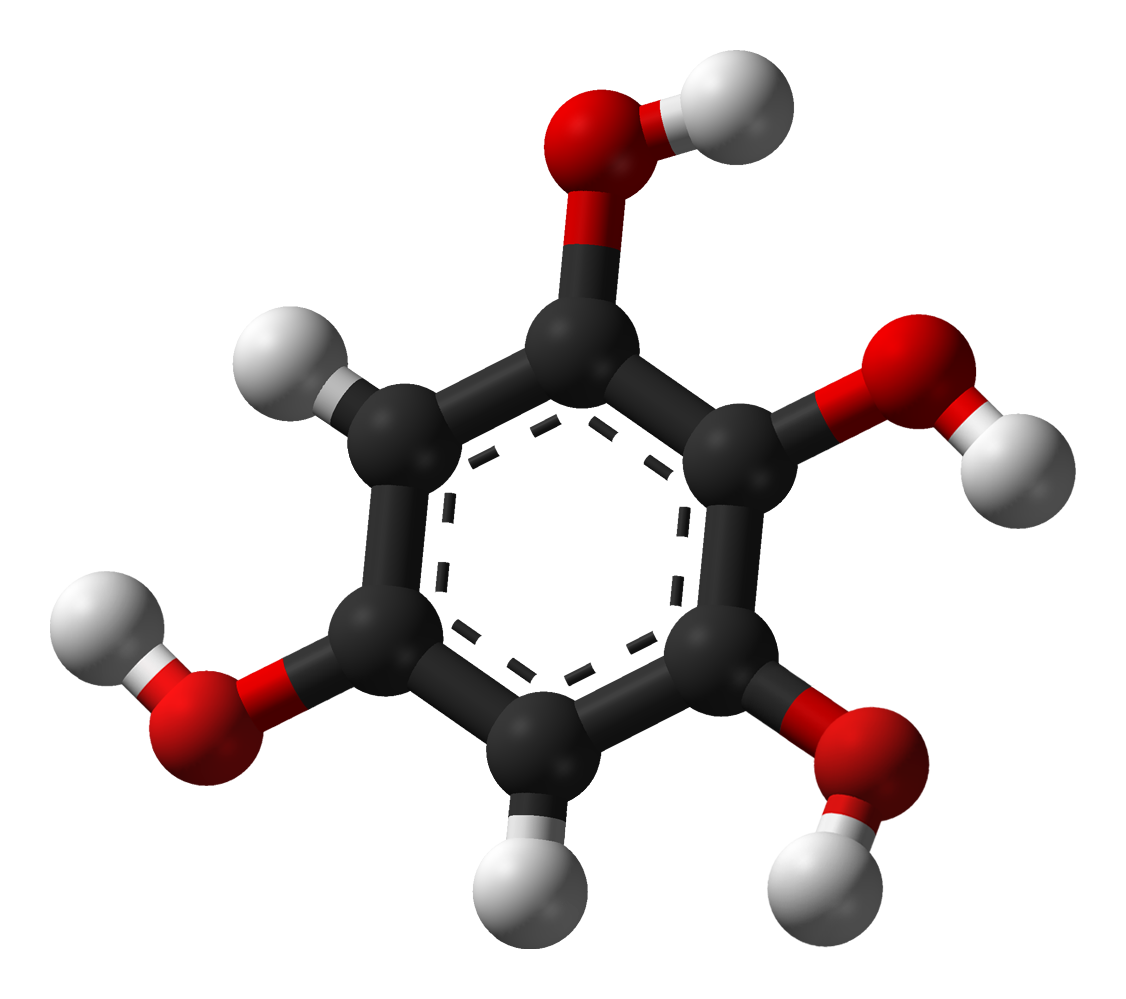
Ball-and-stick model

Names
- Preferred IUPAC name Benzene-1,2,3,5-tetrol
- Other names 1,2,3,5-Benzenetetrol

Identifiers
CAS Number	634-94-6 =
3D model (JSmol)	Interactive image; Interactive image
ChEBI	CHEBI:16746
ChemSpider	11
KEGG	C03743
PubChem CID	12
UNII	6KQM6GV7J9
CompTox Dashboard (EPA)	DTXSID90212812
- InChI: InChI=1S/C6H6O4/c7-3-1-4(8)6(10)5(9)2-3/h1-2,7-10H Key: RDJUHLUBPADHNP-UHFFFAOYSA-N; InChI=1/C6H6O4/c7-3-1-4(8)6(10)5(9)2-3/h1-2,7-10H Key: RDJUHLUBPADHNP-UHFFFAOYAO
- SMILES: Oc1cc(O)cc(O)c1O; Oc1cc(O)c(O)c(O)c1

Properties
Chemical formula	C_{6}H_{6}O_{4}
Molar mass	142.110 g·mol^{−1}
- Except where otherwise noted, data are given for materials in their standard state (at 25 °C [77 °F], 100 kPa). verify (what is ?) Infobox references

1,2,3,5-Tetrahydroxybenzene is a benzenetetrol.

It is a metabolite in the degradation of 3,4,5-trihydroxybenzoate (gallic acid) by Eubacterium oxidoreducens.

The enzyme pyrogallol hydroxytransferase uses 1,2,3,5-tetrahydroxybenzene and 1,2,3-trihydroxybenzene (pyrogallol), whereas its two products are 1,3,5-trihydroxybenzene (phloroglucinol) and 1,2,3,5-tetrahydroxybenzene.

== Uses ==
1,2,3,5-Tetrahydroxybenzene, also known as pyrogallol, has various uses. It is used in the production of certain dyes, photographic developers, and hair dyes. Additionally, pyrogallol has been employed in traditional medicine and some cosmetic formulations due to its antioxidant properties.

== See also ==
- Trihydroxybenzenes
- Pentahydroxybenzene
