= Geoalkalibacter =

Scientific classification
- Domain: Bacteria
- Kingdom: Pseudomonadati
- Phylum: Thermodesulfobacteriota
- Class: Desulfuromonadia
- Order: Desulfuromonadales
- Family: Geoalkalibacteraceae; Waite et al. 2020
- Genus: Geoalkalibacter; Zavarzina et al. 2007

Type species
- Geoalkalibacter ferrihydriticus Zavarzina et al. 2007

Species
- G. ferrihydriticus; "G. halelectricus"; G. subterraneus

Genus of bacteria

Geoalkalibacter is a genus of bacteria from the order Desulfuromonadales.

== Phylogeny ==
The currently accepted taxonomy is based on the List of Prokaryotic names with Standing in Nomenclature (LPSN) and National Center for Biotechnology Information (NCBI).

16S rRNA based LTP_10_2024

- Geoalkalibacter
  - G. ferrihydriticus
  - G. subterraneus

120 marker proteins based GTDB 10-RS226

- Geoalkalibacter
  - G. subterraneus Greene et al. 2009
  - - G. ferrihydriticus Zavarzina et al. 2007
    - "G. halelectricus" Yadav et al. 2022

== See also ==
- List of bacterial orders
- List of bacteria genera
