= Diacetyl reductase ((R)-acetoin forming) =

Diacetyl reductase, (R)-acetoin forming

Identifiers
- EC no.: 1.1.1.303

Databases
- IntEnz: IntEnz view
- BRENDA: BRENDA entry
- ExPASy: NiceZyme view
- KEGG: KEGG entry
- MetaCyc: metabolic pathway
- PRIAM: profile
- PDB structures: RCSB PDB PDBe PDBsum
Search
- PMC: articles
- PubMed: articles
- NCBI: proteins

Diacetyl reductase ((R)-acetoin forming) (EC 1.1.1.303, (R)-acetoin dehydrogenase) is an enzyme with systematic name (R)-acetoin:NAD^{+} oxidoreductase. This enzyme catalyses the following chemical reaction:

(R)-acetoin
+ NAD^{+}
H^{+}
H^{+}
diacetyl
+ NADH

The reaction is catalysed in the reverse direction. This activity is usually associated with butanediol dehydrogenase activity (EC 1.1.1.4 or EC 1.1.1.76). While the butanediol dehydrogenase activity is reversible, diacetyl reductase activity is irreversible. This enzyme has been reported in the yeast Saccharomyces cerevisiae. This enzyme is different from EC 1.1.1.304, diacetyl reductase ((S)-acetoin forming).
