= Malonomonas =

Scientific classification
- Domain: Bacteria
- Kingdom: Pseudomonadati
- Phylum: Thermodesulfobacteriota
- Class: Desulfuromonadia
- Order: Desulfuromonadales
- Family: Geopsychrobacteraceae
- Genus: Malonomonas; Dehning & Schink 1990

Type species
- Malonomonas rubra Dehning & Schink 1990

Species
- M. rubra

Genus of bacteria

Malonomonas is a Gram-negative, non-spore-forming, chemoorganotrophic, anaerobic and motile genus of bacteria with single polar flagellum from the family of Pelobacteraceae with one known species (Malonomonas rubra). Strains of Malonomonas have been isolated from anoxic sediments. the bacteria Malonomonas rubra bacteria metabolizes malonate.

== See also ==
- List of bacterial orders
- List of bacteria genera
