= Acetaldehyde (data page) =

Chemical data page

This page provides supplementary chemical data on acetaldehyde.

== Material Safety Data Sheet ==
The handling of this chemical may require safety precautions. The directions on the Material Safety Datasheet (MSDS) should be followed.

- SDSdata.org index

== Structure and properties ==
Structure and properties
Dielectric constant, ε_{r}	21.1 ε_{0} at 21 °C
Surface tension	22.3 dyn/cm at 10 °C; 21.2 dyn/cm at 20 °C; 17.0 dyn/cm at 50 °C

== Thermodynamic properties ==
Phase behavior
Std entropy change of fusion, Δ_{fus}S^{~~o~~}	15.43 J/(mol·K)
Liquid properties
Std enthalpy change of formation, Δ_{f}H^{~~o~~}_{liquid}	–196.4 kJ/mol
Standard molar entropy, S^{~~o~~}_{liquid}	117.3 J/(mol K)
Enthalpy of combustion, Δ_{c}H^{~~o~~}	–1167 kJ/mol
Heat capacity, c_{p}	96.21 J/(mol K) at 0 °C; 89.05 J/(mol K) at 25 °C
Gas properties
Std enthalpy change of formation, Δ_{f}H^{~~o~~}_{gas}	–170.7 kJ/mol
Standard molar entropy, S^{~~o~~}_{gas}	250.3 J/(mol K)
Heat capacity, c_{p}	55.32 J/(mol K) at 25 °C

== Vapor pressure of liquid ==
P in mm Hg	1	10	40	100	400	760
T in °C	–81.5	–56.8	–37.8	–22.6	4.9	20.2

Table data obtained from CRC Handbook of Chemistry and Physics 44th ed.

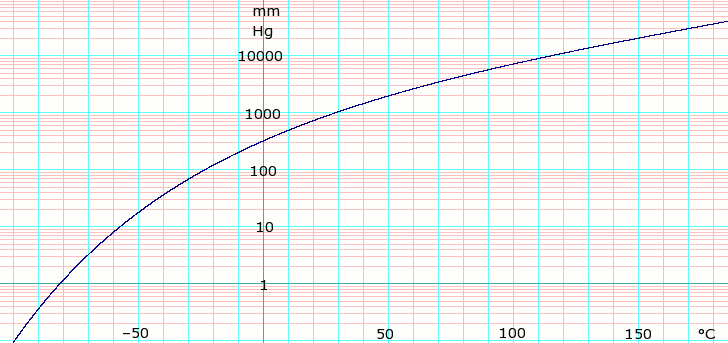
log_{10} of Acetaldehyde vapor pressure. Uses formula: $\scriptstyle \log_e P_{mmHg} =$$\scriptstyle \log_e (\frac {760} {101.325}) - 18.27131\log_e(T+273.15) - \frac {7241.251} {T+273.15} + 130.8048 + 2.633634 \times 10^{-5} (T+273.15)^2$ obtained from CHERIC

== Spectral data ==
IR
Major absorption bands

(liquid film)
Wave number	transmittance
3432 cm^{−1}	72%
3001 cm^{−1}	66%
2846 cm^{−1}	42%
2733 cm^{−1}	44%
1727 cm^{−1}	4%
1629 cm^{−1}	79%
1429 cm^{−1}	36%
1401 cm^{−1}	41%
1350 cm^{−1}	25%
1179 cm^{−1}	70%
1114 cm^{−1}	29%
945 cm^{−1}	77%
767 cm^{−1}	61%
514 cm^{−1}	35%
