= Desulfuromusa ferrireducens =

Scientific classification
- Domain: Bacteria
- Kingdom: Pseudomonadati
- Phylum: Thermodesulfobacteriota
- Class: Desulfuromonadia
- Order: Desulfuromonadales
- Family: Desulfuromonadaceae
- Genus: Desulfuromusa
- Species: D. ferrireducens

Binomial name
- Desulfuromusa ferrireducens Vandieken et al. 2006

Species of bacterium

Desulfuromusa ferrireducens is a species of psychrophilic, Fe(III)-reducing bacteria. It is Gram-negative, rod-shaped and motile. Its type strain is 102T (=DSM 16956^{T} =JCM 12926^{T}).
