= (S,S)-butanediol dehydrogenase =

Class of enzymes

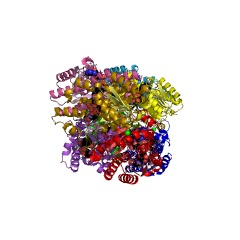

Identifiers
- EC no.: 1.1.1.76
- CAS no.: 37250-14-9

Databases
- IntEnz: IntEnz view
- BRENDA: BRENDA entry
- ExPASy: NiceZyme view
- KEGG: KEGG entry
- MetaCyc: metabolic pathway
- PRIAM: profile
- PDB structures: RCSB PDB PDBe PDBsum
- Gene Ontology: AmiGO / QuickGO
Search
- PMC: articles
- PubMed: articles
- NCBI: proteins

In enzymology, (S,S)-butanediol dehydrogenase (EC 1.1.1.76) is an enzyme that catalyzes the chemical reaction

(S,S)-butane-2,3-diol
+ NAD^{+}
H^{+}
H^{+}
(S)-acetoin
+ NADH

The two substrates of this enzyme are (S,S)-butane-2,3-diol and oxidised nicotinamide adenine dinucleotide (NAD^{+}). Its products are (S)-acetoin, reduced NADH, and a proton.

This enzyme belongs to the family of oxidoreductases, specifically those acting on the CH-OH group of donor with NAD^{+} or NADP^{+} as acceptor. The systematic name of this enzyme class is (S,S)-butane-2,3-diol:NAD^{+} oxidoreductase. Other names in common use include L-butanediol dehydrogenase, L-BDH, and L(^{+})-2,3-butanediol dehydrogenase (L-acetoin forming). This enzyme participates in butanoic acid metabolism.
