= Pyrogallol hydroxytransferase =

Identifiers
- EC no.: 5.4.4.9
- CAS no.: 125978-84-9

Databases
- IntEnz: IntEnz view
- BRENDA: BRENDA entry
- ExPASy: NiceZyme view
- KEGG: KEGG entry
- MetaCyc: metabolic pathway
- PRIAM: profile
- PDB structures: RCSB PDB PDBe PDBsum
- Gene Ontology: AmiGO / QuickGO
Search
- PMC: articles
- PubMed: articles
- NCBI: proteins

Pyrogallol hydroxytransferase (EC 5.4.4.9) is an enzyme that catalyzes a chemical reaction that converts pyrogallol to phloroglucinol by formation of the intermediate 1,2,3,5-tetrahydroxybenzene.

Pyrogallol
1,2,3,5-Tetrahydroxybenzene
Phloroglucinol

The enzyme isolated from the bacterium Pelobacter acidigallici contains molybdenum but the hydroxyl group which is initially added to pyrogallol does not come from water. Instead, some sulfoxides and aromatic N-oxides can provide these groups.

== Nomenclature ==
This enzyme belongs to the family of oxidoreductases. The systematic name of this enzyme class is 1,2,3,5-tetrahydroxybenzene:1,2,3-trihydroxybenzene hydroxytransferase. Other names in common use include 1,2,3,5-tetrahydroxybenzene hydroxyltransferase, 1,2,3,5-tetrahydroxybenzene:pyrogallol transhydroxylase, 1,2,3,5-tetrahydroxybenzene-pyrogallol hydroxyltransferase (transhydroxylase), pyrogallol hydroxyltransferase, 1,2,3,5-tetrahydroxybenzene:1,2,3-trihydroxybenzene hydroxyltransferase.
