= Pelobacter =

Scientific classification
- Domain: Bacteria
- Kingdom: Pseudomonadati
- Phylum: Thermodesulfobacteriota
- Class: Desulfuromonadia
- Order: Desulfuromonadales
- Family: Geopsychrobacteraceae
- Genus: Pelobacter; Schink and Pfennig, 1983

Type species
- Pelobacter acidigallici Schink and Pfennig, 1983

Species
- P. acetylenicus; P. acidigallici; P. carbinolicus; P. masseliensis; P. propionicus; P. seleniigenes; P. venetianus

Genus of bacteria

Pelobacter (gr pelos : mud) is a bacterial genus in the order Desulfuromonadales. The cells are rod-shaped with rounded ends and occur in single, pairs or chains. They have a fermentative metabolism.
