= Geopsychrobacter =

Scientific classification
- Domain: Bacteria
- Kingdom: Pseudomonadati
- Phylum: Thermodesulfobacteriota
- Class: Desulfuromonadia
- Order: Desulfuromonadales
- Family: Geopsychrobacteraceae
- Genus: Geopsychrobacter; Holmes et al. 2005
- Species: G. electrodiphilus

Binomial name
- Geopsychrobacter electrodiphilus Holmes et al. 2005

Genus of bacteria

Geopsychrobacter electrodiphilus is a species of bacteria, the type species and only species of the genus Geopsychrobacter. (Note: A new genus and its type species, Geopsychrobacter elctrodipihilus, were effectively published by Holmes et al. and both taxa got their authority when Validationlist No. 102 (2005, PMID 15774623, DOI:10.1099/ijs.0.63680-0) was published; see LPSN: Geopsychrobacter.) It is a psychrotolerant member of its family, capable of attaching to the anodes of sediment fuel cells and harvesting electricity by oxidation of organic compounds to carbon dioxide and transferring the electrons to the anode.

In microbial communities, G. electrodiphilus could be similar to other Geobacteraceae. The community may ferment complex organic matter, thereby breaking up plant matter, for example; G. electrodiphilus would then oxidize the fermentation products (especially acetate) to carbon dioxide, whereby a terminal electron acceptor [e.g. iron(III) oxide] would be reduced. At least one strain (A1^{T}) can oxidize hydrogen too.

Since G. electrodiphilus belongs to the Geobateraceae and can transfer electrons to the outside, one could assume that electron transfer to a methane producing archaeon could happen. There is another member of Geobacteraceae, well investigated for its interspecies electron transfer, even to a methanogen.

== Description ==
Geopsychrobacter electrodiphilus was isolated from the surface of an electrode (anode) of a marine sediment fuel cell. The sediments come from a water depth of 5 meters (Boston Harbor, Massachusetts, near the peninsula World's End).

The name "Geopsychrobacter electrodiphilus" means somewhat like "electrode-loving rod of cold earth" and indicates that the microbe comes from the surface (earth, Geo), copes with cold (psychro), is rod-shaped (bacter) and was isolated from electrodes (electrodi), which it has voluntarily settled (philus).

Two strains of Geopsychrobacter electrodiphilus were isolated (A1 and A2); Strain A1 was determined as the type strain (A1^{T}; ATCC BAA-880^{T}; DSM 16401^{T}; JCM 12469) of the species Geopsychrobacter electrodiphilus and as the type strain of the genus.

In a study on the cultivation of microbial communities in sludge, where sulphate reducers are likely to benefit, the proportion of Geopsychrobacter decreased. An investigation of bacterial diversity in the cold outflow of an iron oxide-tainted plume of saltwater (Blood Falls, Antarctica) indicated about 11% of cells as G. electrodiphilus. The plume were identified as a subglacial “ocean”, where coupled biogeochemical processes below the glacier enable microbes to grow in extended isolation, accumulating iron(II) despite the presence of an active sulfur cycle.

== Interaction with anodes ==
Holmes et al. 2004 proposed a likely mechanism for a special microbial fuel cell (sediment fuel cell), to support energy with help of G. electrodiphilus and other microbes of a community in marine sediments; based on the article, this imaginary mechanism is summarized here:

- Some microbes digest complex organic matter (fermentation) in an anaerobic (Note: In this context, “anaerobic” is a place without oxygen. See also “anaerobic organism”/ “aerobic organism”.) part of the sediment fuel cell nearby a graphite electrode (anode). G. electrodiphilus grows on the surface of this graphite electrode and oxidize fermentation products, e.g. acetate. Normally, those oxidation processes produce carbon dioxide, protons and electrons and any oxidation has to be coupled to a reduction, because of the electrons. G. electrodiphilus could use a terminal electron acceptor, e.g. poorly crystallized iron(III) oxide (that would be reduced to magnetite) when available. In a sediment fuel cell, G. electrodiphilus has direct contact to the electrode and can use it as a sole electron acceptor. The electrode in the anaerobic part of the sediment fuel cell (anode) has connection to its counterelectrode (cathode) in the overlying aerobic (Note: In this context, “aerobic” is a place with oxygen. See also “aerobic organism”/ “anaerobic organism”.) water. The electrons flow from the anode to the cathode in the overlying aerobic water, where they likely reduce oxygen.

To explain their proposal for the process inside the sediment fuel cell, authors referred to previous investigations.

Holmes et al. (2004) did not investigate microbial communities or technical devices; the aim of their investigations was to find organisms that transfer electrons to an electrode and to describe them. The G. electrodiphilus strains were able to oxidize acetate, malate, fumarate, and citrate with electron transfer to an electrode poised at +0.52 V (in reference to a standard hydrogen electrode).

One key point of harvesting energy using a sediment fuel cell seems to bridge the anaerobic environment of G. electrodiphilus and the aerobic water; the difference in redox potentials can be used.

Reduction of poorly crystalline Fe(III) oxide results in the formation of magnetite. It is therefore conceivable that the oligodynamic effect in Geopsychrobacter is low and an application with metallic components inside a technical device would be possible.

== See also ==
- Exoelectrogen
