= (R,R)-butanediol dehydrogenase =

Class of enzymes

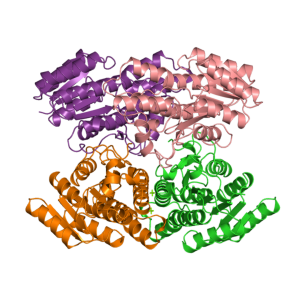
- Meso-2,3-butanediol dehydrogenase from Klebsiella pneumoniae. PDB 1geg

Identifiers
- EC no.: 1.1.1.4
- CAS no.: 37250-09-2

Databases
- BRENDA: enzyme data
- ExPASy: NiceZyme view
- KEGG: enzyme entry
- MetaCyc: metabolic pathway
- Rhea: reactions
- PDB structures: RCSB PDB PDBe PDBsum
- Gene Ontology: AmiGO / QuickGO
Search
- PMC: articles
- PubMed: articles
- NCBI: proteins

(R,R)-butanediol dehydrogenases (EC 1.1.1.4) are a type of enzyme found in humans, bacteria, and yeast that catalyzes the chemical reaction

(R,R)-butane-2,3-diol
+ NAD^{+}
H^{+}
H^{+}
R-acetoin
+ NADH

The two substrates of this enzyme are (R,R)-butane-2,3-diol and NAD^{+}; its products are (R)-acetoin, nicotinamide adenine dinucleotide (NADH), and a proton.

In humans, this reaction can be catalyzed by the multifunctional enzyme sorbitol dehydrogenase, encoded by the gene SORD.

This enzyme belongs to the family of oxidoreductases, specifically those acting on the CH-OH group of donor with NAD^{+} or NADP^{+} as acceptor. The systematic name of this enzyme class is (R,R)-butane-2,3-diol:NAD^{+} oxidoreductase. Other names in common use include butyleneglycol dehydrogenase, D-butanediol dehydrogenase, D-(−)-butanediol dehydrogenase, butylene glycol dehydrogenase, diacetyl (acetoin) reductase, D-aminopropanol dehydrogenase, D-aminopropanol dehydrogenase, 1-amino-2-propanol dehydrogenase, 2,3-butanediol dehydrogenase, D-1-amino-2-propanol dehydrogenase, (R)-diacetyl reductase, (R)-2,3-butanediol dehydrogenase, D-1-amino-2-propanol:NAD^{+} oxidoreductase, 1-amino-2-propanol oxidoreductase, and aminopropanol oxidoreductase. This enzyme participates in butanoic acid metabolism.
