= Geothermobacter =

Scientific classification
- Domain: Bacteria
- Kingdom: Pseudomonadati
- Phylum: Thermodesulfobacteriota
- Class: Desulfuromonadia
- Order: Desulfuromonadales
- Family: Geothermobacteraceae; Waite et al. 2020
- Genus: Geothermobacter; Kashefi et al. 2005

Type species
- Geothermobacter ehrlichii Kashefi et al. 2005

Species
- G. ehrlichii; G. hydrogeniphilus

Genus of bacteria

Geothermobacter is a thermophilic genus of bacteria from the order Desulfuromonadales.
