= Acetaldehyde =

Organic chemical compound

Lewis structure of acetaldehyde
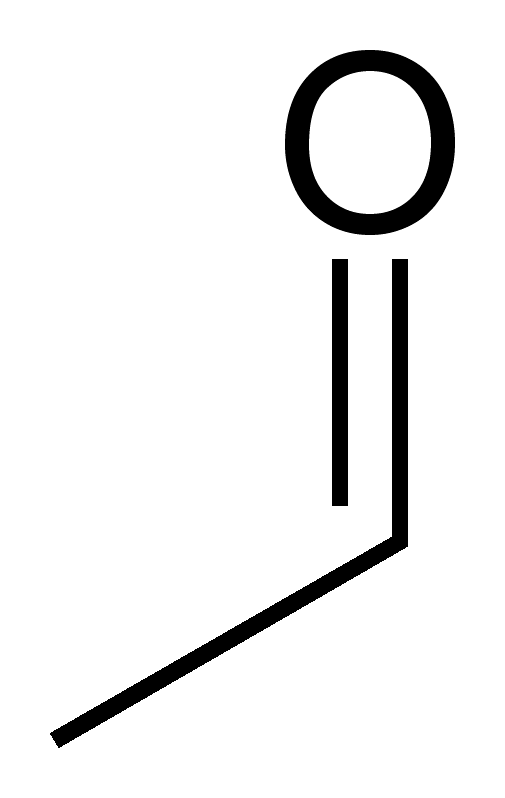
Skeletal structure of acetaldehyde
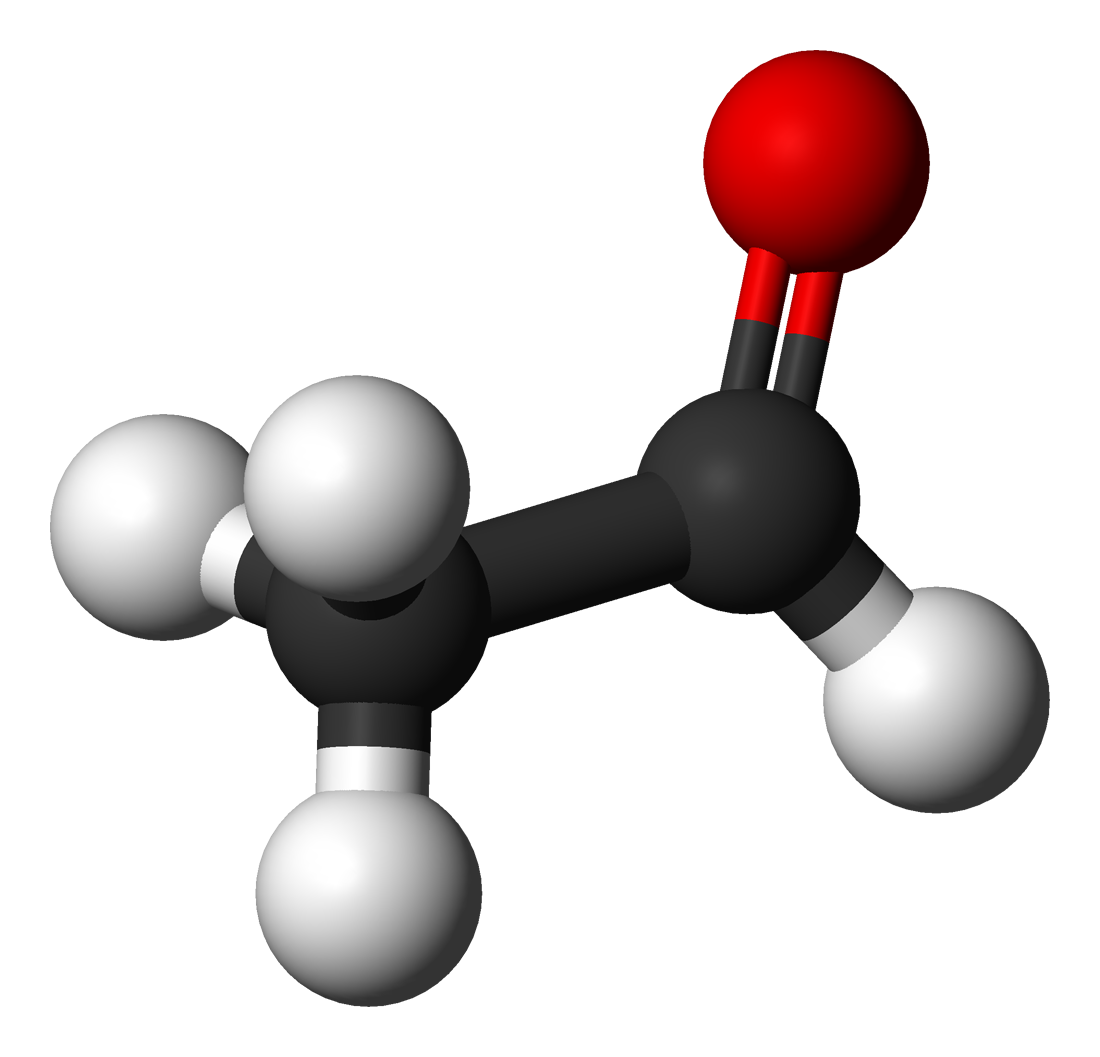
Ball-and-stick model
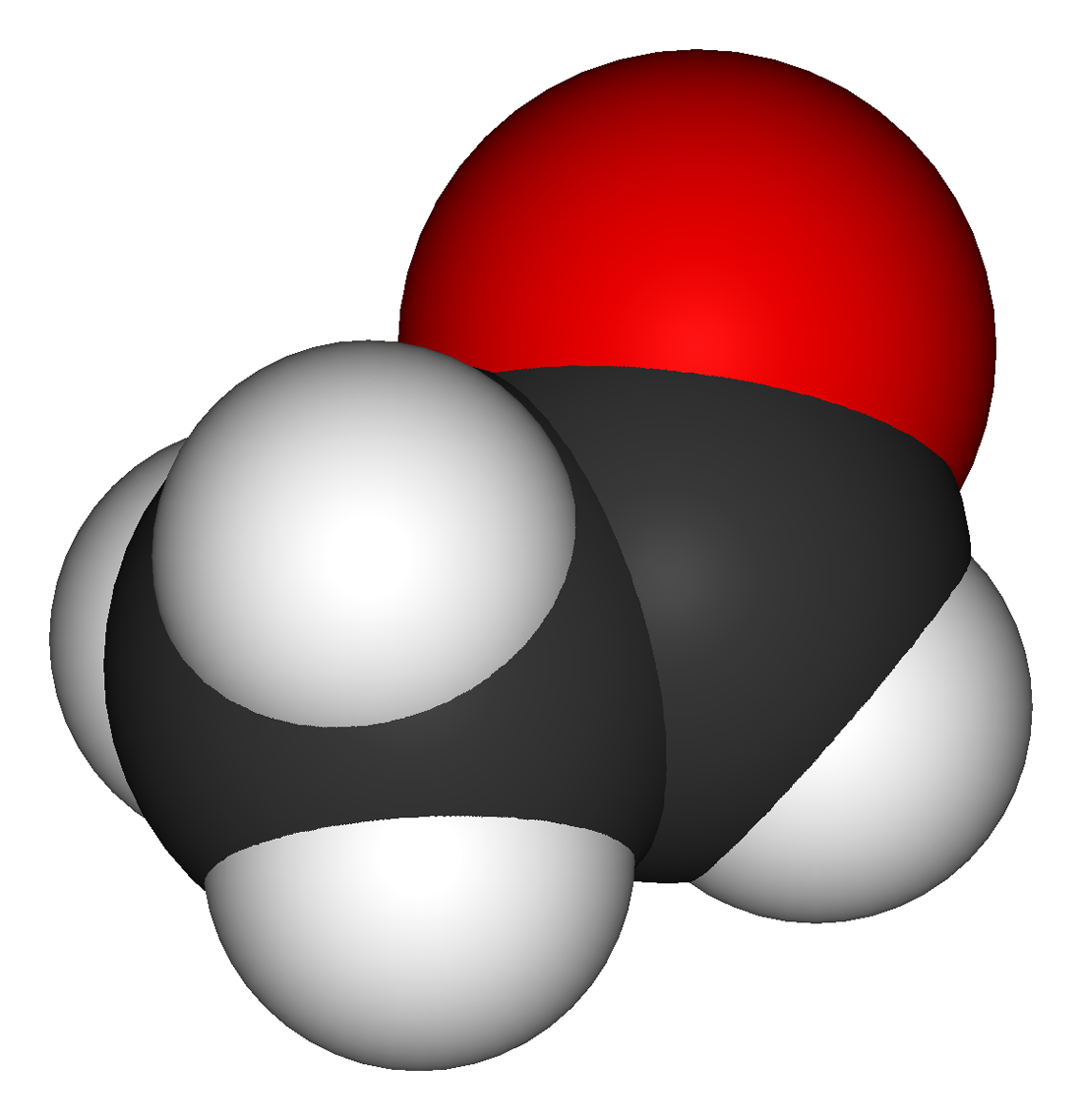
Space-filling model

Names
- Preferred IUPAC name Acetaldehyde
- Systematic IUPAC name Ethanal
- Other names Acetic aldehyde Ethyl aldehyde Acetylaldehyde

Identifiers
CAS Number	75-07-0
3D model (JSmol)	Interactive image; Interactive image
Abbreviations	AcH
ChEBI	CHEBI:15343
ChEMBL	ChEMBL170365
ChemSpider	172
ECHA InfoCard	100.000.761
EC Number	200-836-8
IUPHAR/BPS	6277
KEGG	C00084
PubChem CID	177
RTECS number	AB1925000
UNII	GO1N1ZPR3B
CompTox Dashboard (EPA)	DTXSID5039224
- InChI: InChI=1S/C2H4O/c1-2-3/h2H,1H3 Key: IKHGUXGNUITLKF-UHFFFAOYSA-N; InChI=1/C2H4O/c1-2-3/h2H,1H3 Key: IKHGUXGNUITLKF-UHFFFAOYAB
- SMILES: O=CC; CC=O

Properties
Chemical formula	C_{2}H_{4}O
Molar mass	44.053 g·mol^{−1}
Appearance	Colourless gas or liquid
Odor	Ethereal
Density	0.784 g·cm^{−3} (20 °C) 0.7904–0.7928 g·cm^{−3} (10 °C)
Melting point	−123.37 °C (−190.07 °F; 149.78 K)
Boiling point	20.2 °C (68.4 °F; 293.3 K)
Critical point (T, P)	466 K (193 °C), 5570 kPa
Solubility in water	miscible
Solubility	miscible with ethanol, ether, benzene, toluene, xylene, turpentine, acetone slightly soluble in chloroform
log P	−0.34
Vapor pressure	740 mmHg (20 °C)
Acidity (pK_{a})	13.57 (25 °C, H_{2}O)
Magnetic susceptibility (χ)	−0.5153^{−6} cm^{3}/g
Refractive index (n_{D})	1.3316
Viscosity	0.21 mPa-s at 20 °C (0.253 mPa-s at 9.5 °C)

Structure
Molecular shape	trigonal planar (sp^{2}) at C_{1} tetrahedral (sp^{3}) at C_{2}
Dipole moment	2.7 D

Thermochemistry
Heat capacity (C)	89 J·mol^{−1}·K^{−1}
Std molar entropy (S^{⦵}_{298})	160.2 J·mol^{−1}·K^{−1}
Std enthalpy of formation (Δ_{f}H^{⦵}_{298})	−192.2 kJ·mol^{−1}
Gibbs free energy (Δ_{f}G^{⦵})	−127.6 kJ·mol^{−1}
Std enthalpy of combustion (Δ_{c}H^{⦵}_{298})	−1167 kJ·mol
Enthalpy of fusion (Δ_{f}H^{⦵}_{fus})	−2.310 kJ·mol
Enthalpy of vaporization (Δ_{f}H_{vap})	26.12 kJ·mol

Related compounds
Related aldehydes	Formaldehyde; Propionaldehyde
Related compounds	Ethylene oxide

Hazards
- Occupational safety and health (OHS/OSH)
Main hazards	suspected carcinogen
- GHS labelling
Pictograms	(GHS02: Flammable) (GHS07: Exclamation mark) (GHS08: Health hazard)
Hazard statements	H224, H319, H335, H351
Precautionary statements	P210, P261, P281, P305+P351+P338
NFPA 704 (fire diamond)	3 4 3
Flash point	−39.00 °C; −38.20 °F; 234.15 K
Autoignition temperature	175.00 °C; 347.00 °F; 448.15 K
Explosive limits	4.0–60%
- Lethal dose or concentration (LD, LC)
LD_{50} (median dose)	1930 mg/kg (rat, oral)
LC_{50} (median concentration)	13,000 ppm (rat), 17,000 ppm (hamster), 20,000 ppm (rat)
- NIOSH (US health exposure limits)
PEL (Permissible)	200 ppm (360 mg/m^{3})
IDLH (Immediate danger)	2000 ppm
Safety data sheet (SDS)	HMDB

Supplementary data page
- Acetaldehyde (data page)
- Except where otherwise noted, data are given for materials in their standard state (at 25 °C [77 °F], 100 kPa). verify (what is ?) Infobox references

Acetaldehyde (IUPAC systematic name ethanal) is an organic chemical compound with the formula CH_{3}CH=O. It is a colorless liquid or gas, boiling near room temperature. It is one of the most important aldehydes, occurring widely in nature and being produced on a large scale in industry. Acetaldehyde occurs naturally in coffee, bread, and ripe fruit, and is produced by plants. It is also produced by the partial oxidation of ethanol by the liver enzyme alcohol dehydrogenase and is a contributing cause of hangover after alcohol consumption. Pathways of exposure include air, water, land, or groundwater, as well as drink and smoke. Consumption of disulfiram inhibits acetaldehyde dehydrogenase, the enzyme responsible for the metabolism of acetaldehyde, thereby causing it to build up in the body.

Although the International Agency for Research on Cancer has listed acetaldehyde as a Group 1 carcinogen, there is insufficient evidence from human studies to prove a cause-and-effect relationship between acetaldehyde exposure and cancer.

== History ==
Acetaldehyde was first observed by the Swedish pharmacist/chemist Carl Wilhelm Scheele (1774); it was then investigated by the French chemists Antoine François, comte de Fourcroy and Louis Nicolas Vauquelin (1800), and the German chemists Johann Wolfgang Döbereiner (1821, 1822, 1832) and Justus von Liebig (1835).

In 1835, Liebig named it "aldehyde", and in the middle of the century the name was altered to "acetaldehyde".

== Production ==
In 2013, global production was about 438,000 tonnes. Before 1962, ethanol and acetylene were the major sources of acetaldehyde. Since then, ethylene is the dominant feedstock.

The main method of production is the oxidation of ethylene by the Wacker process, which involves oxidation of ethylene using a homogeneous palladium/copper catalyst system:

2 CH_{2}=CH_{2} + O_{2} → 2 CH_{3}CH=O

In the 1970s, the world capacity of the Wacker-Hoechst direct oxidation process exceeded two million tonnes annually.

Smaller quantities can be prepared by the partial oxidation of ethanol in an exothermic reaction. This process typically is conducted over a silver catalyst at about 500–650 °C (950–1,200 °F).

2 CH_{3}CH_{2}OH + O_{2} → 2 CH_{3}CH=O + 2 H_{2}O

This method is one of the oldest routes for the industrial preparation of acetaldehyde.

=== Other methods ===
==== Hydration of acetylene ====
Prior to the Wacker process and the availability of cheap ethylene, acetaldehyde was produced by the hydration of acetylene. This reaction is catalyzed by mercury(II) salts:

C_{2}H_{2} + Hg^{2+} + H_{2}O → CH_{3}CH=O + Hg

The mechanism involves the intermediacy of vinyl alcohol, which tautomerizes to acetaldehyde. The reaction is conducted at 90–95 °C (194–203 °F), and the acetaldehyde formed is separated from water and mercury and cooled to 25–30 °C (77–86 °F). In the wet oxidation process, iron(III) sulfate is used to reoxidize the mercury back to the mercury(II) salt. The resulting iron(II) sulfate is oxidized in a separate reactor with nitric acid.

The enzyme Acetylene hydratase discovered in the strictly anaerobic bacterium Pelobacter acetylenicus can catalyze an analogous reaction without involving any compounds of mercury. However, it has thus far not been brought to any large-scale or commercial use.

==== Dehydrogenation of ethanol ====
Traditionally, acetaldehyde was produced by the partial dehydrogenation of ethanol:

CH_{3}CH_{2}OH → CH_{3}CH=O + H_{2}

In this endothermic process, ethanol vapor is passed at 260–290 °C over a copper-based catalyst. The process was once attractive because of the value of the hydrogen coproduct, but in modern times is not economically viable.

==== Hydroformylation of methanol ====
The hydroformylation of methanol with catalysts like cobalt, nickel, or iron salts also produces acetaldehyde, although this process is of no industrial importance. Similarly noncompetitive, acetaldehyde arises from synthesis gas with modest selectivity.

== Reactions ==
=== Tautomerization to vinyl alcohol ===
Tautomeric equilibrium between acetaldehyde and vinyl alcohol.

Like many other carbonyl compounds, acetaldehyde tautomerizes to give an enol (vinyl alcohol; IUPAC name: ethenol):

CH_{3}CH=O ⇌ CH_{2}=CHOH ∆H_{298,g} = +42.7 kJ/mol

The equilibrium constant is 6×10^{−7} at room temperature, thus that the relative amount of the enol form in a sample of acetaldehyde is very small. At room temperature, acetaldehyde (CH_{3}CH=O) is more stable than vinyl alcohol (CH_{2}=CHOH) by 42.7 kJ/mol: Overall the keto-enol tautomerization occurs slowly but is catalyzed by acids.

Photo-induced keto-enol tautomerization is viable under atmospheric or stratospheric conditions. This photo-tautomerization is relevant to the Earth's atmosphere, because vinyl alcohol is thought to be a precursor to carboxylic acids in the atmosphere.

=== Addition and condensation reactions ===
Acetaldehyde is a common electrophile in organic synthesis. In addition reactions acetaldehyde is prochiral. It is used primarily as a source of the "CH_{3}C^{+}H(OH)" synthon in aldol reactions and related condensation reactions. Grignard reagents and organolithium compounds react with MeCHO to give hydroxyethyl derivatives. In one of the more spectacular addition reactions, formaldehyde in the presence of calcium hydroxide adds to MeCHO to give pentaerythritol, C(CH_{2}OH)_{4} and formate.

In a Strecker reaction, acetaldehyde condenses with cyanide and ammonia to give, after hydrolysis, the amino acid alanine. Acetaldehyde can condense with amines to yield imines; for example, with cyclohexylamine to give N-ethylidenecyclohexylamine. These imines can be used to direct subsequent reactions like an aldol condensation.

It is also a building block in the synthesis of heterocyclic compounds. In one example, it converts, upon treatment with ammonia, to 5-ethyl-2-methylpyridine ("aldehyde-collidine").

=== Polymeric forms ===
Cyclic oligomers of acetaldehyde (CH_{3}CHO)_{n}: paraldehyde (n = 3, left) and metaldehyde (n = 4, right)

Three molecules of acetaldehyde condense to form "paraldehyde", a cyclic trimer containing C-O single bonds. Similarly condensation of four molecules of acetaldehyde give the cyclic molecule metaldehyde. Paraldehyde can be produced in good yields, using a sulfuric acid catalyst. Metaldehyde is only obtained in a few percent yield and with cooling, often using HBr rather than H_{2}SO_{4} as the catalyst. At −40 °C (−40 °F) in the presence of acid catalysts, polyacetaldehyde is produced. There are two stereomers of paraldehyde and four of metaldehyde.

The German chemist Valentin Hermann Weidenbusch (1821–1893) synthesized paraldehyde in 1848 by treating acetaldehyde with acid (either sulfuric or nitric acid) and cooling to 0 °C (32 °F). He found it quite remarkable that when paraldehyde was heated with a trace of the same acid, the reaction went the other way, recreating acetaldehyde.

Although vinyl alcohol is a tautomeric form of acetaldehyde (§ Tautomerization to vinyl alcohol), polyvinyl alcohol cannot be produced from acetaldehyde.

=== Acetal derivatives ===
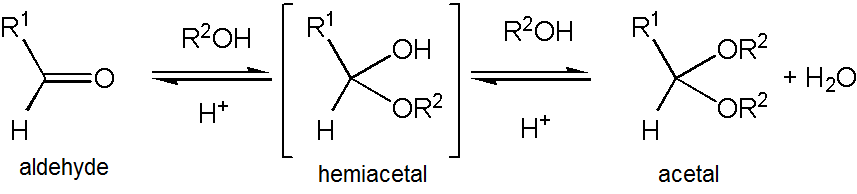
Conversion of acetaldehyde to 1,1-diethoxyethane, R^{1}=CH_{3} R^{2}=CH_{3}CH_{2}

Acetaldehyde forms a stable acetal upon reaction with ethanol under conditions that favor dehydration. The product, CH_{3}CH(OCH_{2}CH_{3})_{2}, is formally named 1,1-diethoxyethane but is commonly referred to as "acetal". This can cause confusion as "acetal" is more commonly used to describe compounds with the functional groups RCH(OR')_{2} or RR'C(OR'')_{2} rather than referring to this specific compound — in fact, 1,1-diethoxyethane is also described as the diethyl acetal of acetaldehyde.

=== Precursor to vinylphosphonic acid ===
Acetaldehyde is a precursor to vinylphosphonic acid, which is used to make adhesives and ion conductive membranes. The synthesis sequence begins with a reaction with phosphorus trichloride:

1. PCl_{3} + CH_{3}CHO → CH_{3}CH(O^{−})PCl^{+}_{3}
2. CH_{3}CH(O^{−})PCl^{+}_{3} + 2 CH_{3}CO_{2}H → CH_{3}CH(Cl)PO(OH)_{2} + 2 CH_{3}COCl
3. CH_{3}CH(Cl)PO(OH)_{2} → CH_{2}=CHPO(OH)_{2} + HCl

== Biochemistry ==
In the liver, the enzyme alcohol dehydrogenase oxidizes ethanol into acetaldehyde, which is then further oxidized into harmless acetic acid by acetaldehyde dehydrogenase. These two oxidation reactions are coupled with the reduction of NAD^{+} to NADH. In the brain, the enzyme catalase is primarily responsible for oxidizing ethanol to acetaldehyde, and alcohol dehydrogenase plays a minor role. The last steps of alcoholic fermentation in bacteria, plants, and yeast involve the conversion of pyruvate into acetaldehyde and carbon dioxide by the enzyme pyruvate decarboxylase, followed by the conversion of acetaldehyde into ethanol. The latter reaction is again catalyzed by an alcohol dehydrogenase, now operating in the opposite direction.

Many East Asian people have an ALDH2 mutation which makes them significantly less efficient at oxidizing acetaldehyde to acetic acid. On consuming alcohol, their bodies tend to accumulate excessive amounts of acetaldehyde, causing the so-called alcohol flush reaction. They develop a characteristic reddening of the skin on the face and body, alongside nausea, headache and general physical discomfort.

== Uses ==
Traditionally, acetaldehyde was mainly used as a precursor to acetic acid. This application has declined because acetic acid is produced more efficiently from methanol by the Monsanto and Cativa processes. Acetaldehyde is an important precursor to pyridine derivatives, pentaerythritol, and crotonaldehyde. Urea and acetaldehyde combine to give a useful resin. Acetic anhydride reacts with acetaldehyde to give ethylidene diacetate, a precursor to vinyl acetate, which is used to produce polyvinyl acetate.

The global market for acetaldehyde is declining. Demand has been impacted by changes in the production of plasticizer alcohols, which has shifted because n-butyraldehyde is less often produced from acetaldehyde, instead being generated by hydroformylation of propylene. Likewise, acetic acid, once produced from acetaldehyde, is made predominantly by the lower-cost methanol carbonylation process. The impact on demand has led to increase in prices and thus slowdown in the market.

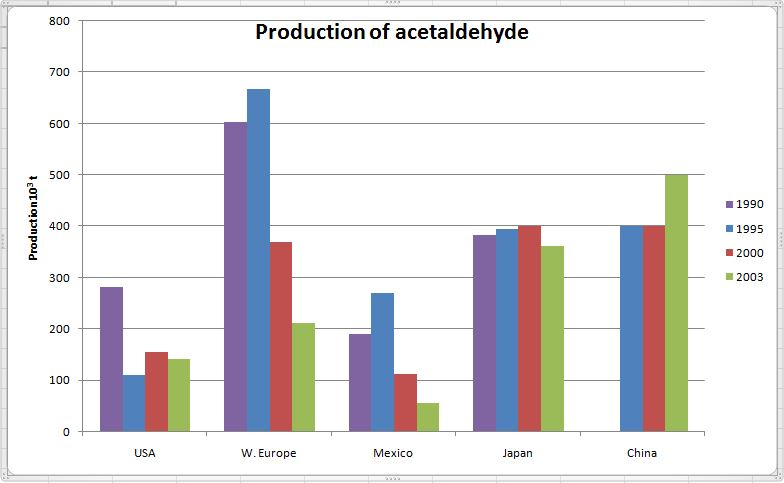
Production of Acetaldehyde

Consumption of acetaldehyde (10^{3} t) in 2003 (* Included in others -glyoxal/glyoxalic acid, crotonaldehyde, lactic acid, n-butanol, 2-ethylhexanol)
Product	USA	Mexico	W. Europe	Japan	Total
Acetic Acid/Acetic anhydride	-	11	89	47	147
Acetate esters	35	8	54	224	321
Pentaerythritol	26	–	43	11	80
Pyridine and pyridine bases	73	–	10	*	83
Peracetic acid	23	–	–	*	23
1,3-Butylene glycol	14	–	–	*	14
Others	5	3	10	80	98
Total	176	22	206	362	766

China is the largest consumer of acetaldehyde in the world, accounting for almost half of global consumption in 2012. Major use has been the production of acetic acid. Other uses such as pyridines and pentaerythritol are expected to grow faster than acetic acid, but the volumes are not large enough to offset the decline in acetic acid. As a consequence, overall acetaldehyde consumption in China may grow slightly at 1.6% per year through 2018. Western Europe is the second-largest consumer of acetaldehyde worldwide, accounting for 20% of world consumption in 2012. As with China, the Western European acetaldehyde market is expected to increase only very slightly at 1% per year during 2012–2018. However, Japan could emerge as a potential consumer for acetaldehyde in the next five years due to newfound use in commercial production of butadiene. The supply of butadiene has been volatile in Japan and the rest of Asia. This should provide the much needed boost to the flat market, as of 2013.

== Safety ==
=== Exposure limits ===
The threshold limit value is 25 ppm (STEL/ceiling value) and the MAK (Maximum Workplace Concentration) is 50 ppm. At 50 ppm acetaldehyde, no irritation or local tissue damage in the nasal mucosa is observed. When taken up by the organism, acetaldehyde is metabolized rapidly in the liver to acetic acid. Only a small proportion is exhaled unchanged. After intravenous injection, the half-life in the blood is approximately 90 seconds.

=== Toxicity ===
Cases of acute intoxication have been recorded. Acetaldehyde naturally breaks down in the human body.

==== Irritation ====
Acetaldehyde is an irritant of the skin, eyes, mucous membranes, throat, and respiratory tract. This occurs at concentrations as low as 1000 ppm. Symptoms of exposure to this compound include nausea, vomiting, and headache. These symptoms may not happen immediately. The perception threshold for acetaldehyde in air is in the range between 0.07 and 0.25 ppm. At such concentrations, the fruity odor of acetaldehyde is apparent. Conjunctival irritations have been observed after a 15-minute exposure to concentrations of 25 and 50 ppm, but transient conjunctivitis and irritation of the respiratory tract have been reported after exposure to 200 ppm acetaldehyde for 15 minutes.

==== Potential for carcinogenicity ====
According to a 2021 assessment of animal studies by the US National Toxicology Program, acetaldehyde is reasonably anticipated to be a human carcinogen, although epidemiological studies have not produced sufficient evidence to establish a relationship between human cancer and specific acetaldehyde exposure. In 2023, a Working Group of the International Agency for Research on Cancer (IARC) concluded that risks for oral and esophageal cancer could be reduced by abstaining from alcohol consumption, thereby reducing intake of acetaldehyde, which is implicated as a possible cancer factor when alcohol is metabolized.

In 2009, IARC had concluded that acetaldehyde in alcoholic beverages was a Group I human carcinogen, as estimated from dose-response relationships between alcohol use and the incidence of cancers in the mouth and esophagus.

Despite concerns for its potential carcinogenicity in higher concentrations, acetaldehyde is an approved food flavoring ingredient in the European Union and United States where the Food and Drug Administration lists it as generally recognized as safe. With a concentration typically less than 0.05% in foods, acetaldehyde is used as a fruit or butter flavor in manufactured milk products, baked goods, juices and soft drinks, candies, and desserts. A scientific review in 2012 by a safety committee for the European Commission concluded that acetaldehyde in foods or beverages at an estimated amount of 11 mg per person per day would not be a safety concern. A 2023 review by the German Research Foundation stated that use of acetaldehyde as a food ingredient should be reassessed due to its toxicity potential.

According to one review, acetaldehyde is among environmental "air toxins with cancer risk".

=== Genetic conditions ===
A study of 818 heavy drinkers found that those exposed to more acetaldehyde than normal through a genetic variant of the gene encoding for ADH1C, ADH1C*1, are at greater risk of developing cancers of the upper gastrointestinal tract and liver.

=== Sources of exposure ===
==== Indoor air ====
Acetaldehyde is a potential contaminant in workplace, indoors, and ambient environments. Moreover, the majority of humans spend more than 90% of their time in indoor environments, increasing any exposure and the risk to human health.

In a study in France, the mean indoor concentration of acetaldehydes measured in 16 homes was approximately seven times higher than the outside acetaldehyde concentration. The living room had a mean of 18.1±17.5 μg m^{−3} and the bedroom was 18.2±16.9 μg m^{−3}, whereas the outdoor air had a mean concentration of 2.3±2.6 μg m^{−3}.

It has been concluded that volatile organic compounds (VOC) such as benzene, formaldehyde, acetaldehyde, toluene, and xylenes have to be considered priority pollutants with respect to their health effects. It has been pointed that in renovated or completely new buildings, the VOCs concentration levels are often several orders of magnitude higher. The main sources of acetaldehydes in homes include building materials, laminate, PVC flooring, varnished wood flooring, and varnished cork/pine flooring (found in the varnish, not the wood). It is also found in plastics, oil-based and water-based paints, in composite wood ceilings, particle-board, plywood, treated pine wood, and laminated chipboard furniture.

==== Outdoor air ====
The use of acetaldehyde is widespread in different industries, and it may be released into waste water or the air during production, use, transportation and storage. Sources of acetaldehyde include fuel combustion emissions from stationary internal combustion engines and power plants that burn fossil fuels, wood, or trash, oil and gas extraction, refineries, cement kilns, lumber and wood mills and paper mills. Acetaldehyde is also present in automobile and diesel exhaust. As a result, acetaldehyde is "one of the most frequently found air toxics with cancer risk greater than one in a million".

==== Tobacco smoke ====
Cellulose has been shown to be the primary precursor that makes acetaldehyde a significant constituent of tobacco smoke. It has been demonstrated to have a synergistic effect with nicotine in rodent studies of addiction. Acetaldehyde is also the most abundant polar carcinogen in tobacco smoke; it is dissolved into the saliva while smoking.

==== Cannabis smoke ====
Acetaldehyde has been found in cannabis smoke. This finding emerged through the use of new chemical techniques that demonstrated the acetaldehyde present was causing DNA damage in laboratory settings.

==== Alcohol consumption ====
Many microbes produce acetaldehyde from ethanol, but they have a lower capacity to eliminate the acetaldehyde, which can lead to the accumulation of acetaldehyde in saliva, stomach acid, and intestinal contents. Fermented food and many alcoholic beverages can also contain significant amounts of acetaldehyde. Acetaldehyde, derived from mucosal or microbial oxidation of ethanol, tobacco smoke, and diet, appears to act as a cumulative carcinogen in the upper digestive tract of humans. According to European Commission's Scientific Committee on Consumer Safety's (SCCS) "Opinion on Acetaldehyde" (2012) the cosmetic products special risk limit is 5 mg/L and acetaldehyde should not be used in mouth-washing products.

==== Plastics ====
Acetaldehyde can be produced by the photolysis of polyethylene terephthalate (PET), via a Type II Norrish reaction.

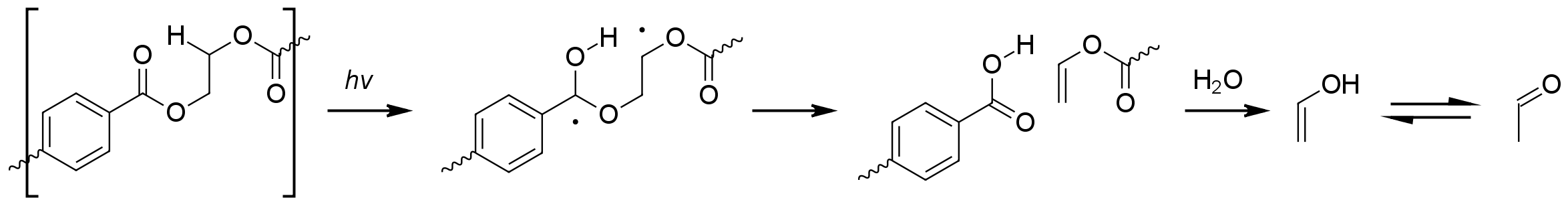

Although this process is generally harmless to humans, acetaldehyde has an exceedingly low odor threshold of around 30 parts per billion and can thus cause unusual tastes and smells in bottled water.

==== Candida overgrowth ====
The yeast Candida albicans in patients with potentially carcinogenic oral diseases has been shown to produce acetaldehyde in quantities sufficient to cause problems.

== See also ==
- Alcohol dehydrogenase
- Disulfiram-like drug
- Formaldehyde
- Paraldehyde
- Wine fault
