= Geopsychrobacteraceae =

Scientific classification
- Domain: Bacteria
- Kingdom: Pseudomonadati
- Phylum: Thermodesulfobacteriota
- Class: Desulfuromonadia
- Order: Desulfuromonadales
- Family: Geopsychrobacteraceae; Waite et al. 2020

Genera
- Desulfuromusa; Geopsychrobacter; Malonomonas; Pelobacter; Pelovirga; Seleniibacterium

Synonyms
- "Pelobacteraceae" Waite et al. 2020

Family of bacteria

Geopsychrobacteraceae is a family of bacteria within the phylum Thermodesulfobacteriota.

== Phylogeny ==
The currently accepted taxonomy is based on the List of Prokaryotic names with Standing in Nomenclature (LPSN) and National Center for Biotechnology Information (NCBI).

16S rRNA based LTP_10_2024

- - - Desulfuromusa ferrireducens Vandieken et al. 2006
    - Malonomonas Dehning and Schink 1990
  - - Geopsychrobacter Holmes et al. 2005
    - - Pelovirga Khomyakova et al. 2023
      - - Desulfuromusa Liesack & Finster 1994
        - - Seleniibacterium Waite et al. 2020
          - Pelobacter Schink & Pfennig 1983

120 marker proteins based GTDB 10-RS226

- - Geopsychrobacter
  - - Malonomonas
    - - - Pelovirga
        - Seleniibacterium
      - Desulfuromusa
