= Pentahydroxybenzene =

Names
- Preferred IUPAC name Benzenepentol
- Other names 1,2,3,4,5-Benzenepentol

Identifiers
CAS Number	4270-96-6
3D model (JSmol)	Interactive image
ChEBI	CHEBI:193968
ChemSpider	279779
PubChem CID	316180
UNII	F8JPD7Y26L
CompTox Dashboard (EPA)	DTXSID90311490
- InChI: InChI=1S/C6H6O5/c7-2-1-3(8)5(10)6(11)4(2)9/h1,7-11H Key: RUFWIGMRKSSQJC-UHFFFAOYSA-N
- SMILES: C1=C(C(=C(C(=C1O)O)O)O)O

Properties
Chemical formula	C_{6}H_{6}O_{5}
Molar mass	158.109 g·mol^{−1}
Appearance	White crystals
- Except where otherwise noted, data are given for materials in their standard state (at 25 °C [77 °F], 100 kPa). Infobox references

Pentahydroxybenzene (C_{6}H_{6}O_{5}) is a chemical compound whose structure consists of a benzene ring with five hydroxy groups (–OH) as substituents. The compound forms white to pinkish crystals. It decomposes at 264–269 °C.
