= Acetoin =

- 3-Hydroxybutanone

Names
- Preferred IUPAC name 3-Hydroxybutan-2-one
- Other names 3-Hydroxybutanone; Acetyl methyl carbinol

Identifiers
CAS Number	513-86-0 (R/S); 53584-56-8 (R); 78183-56-9 (S)
3D model (JSmol)	Interactive image; (R): Interactive image; (S): Interactive image
ChEBI	CHEBI:15688; CHEBI:15686 (R); CHEBI:15687 (S)
ChemSpider	21105851; 388445 (R); 394765 (S)
ECHA InfoCard	100.007.432
EC Number	208-174-1
KEGG	C00466; C00810 (R); C01769 (S)
PubChem CID	179; 439314 (R); 447765 (S)
RTECS number	EL8790000
UNII	BG4D34CO2H
CompTox Dashboard (EPA)	DTXSID0024399
- InChI: InChI=1S/C4H8O2/c1-3(5)4(2)6/h3,5H,1-2H3 Key: ROWKJAVDOGWPAT-UHFFFAOYSA-N; InChI=1/C4H8O2/c1-3(5)4(2)6/h3,5H,1-2H3 Key: ROWKJAVDOGWPAT-UHFFFAOYAD
- SMILES: CC(=O)C(C)O; (R): CC(=O)[C@@H](C)O; (S): CC(=O)[C@H](C)O

Properties
Chemical formula	C_{4}H_{8}O_{2}
Molar mass	88.106 g·mol^{−1}
Appearance	colorless liquid
Odor	bland, yogurt-like
Density	1.012 g/cm^{3}
Melting point	15 °C (59 °F; 288 K)
Boiling point	148 °C (298 °F; 421 K)
Solubility in water	1000 g/L (20 °C)
Solubility in other solvents	Soluble in alcohol Slightly soluble in ether, petroleum ether Miscible in propylene glycol Insoluble in vegetable oil
log P	−0.36
Acidity (pK_{a})	13.72
Chiral rotation ([α]_{D})	−39.4
Refractive index (n_{D})	1.4171

Hazards
Flash point	41 °C (106 °F; 314 K)
- Lethal dose or concentration (LD, LC)
LD_{50} (median dose)	> 5000 mg/kg (rat, oral)
Safety data sheet (SDS)	MSDS
- Except where otherwise noted, data are given for materials in their standard state (at 25 °C [77 °F], 100 kPa). verify (what is ?) Infobox references

Acetoin, also known as 3-hydroxybutanone or acetyl methyl carbinol, is an organic compound with the formula CH_{3}CH(OH)C(O)CH_{3}. It is a colorless liquid with a pleasant, buttery odor. It is chiral. The form produced by bacteria is (R)-acetoin.

== Production in bacteria ==
Acetoin is a neutral, four-carbon molecule used as an external energy store by a number of fermentative bacteria. It is produced by the decarboxylation of alpha-acetolactate, a common precursor in the biosynthesis of branched-chain amino acids. Owing to its neutral nature, production and excretion of acetoin during exponential growth prevents over-acidification of the cytoplasm and the surrounding medium that would result from accumulation of acidic metabolic products, such as acetic acid and citric acid. Once superior carbon sources are exhausted, and the culture enters stationary phase, acetoin can be used to maintain the culture density. The conversion of acetoin into acetyl-CoA is catalysed by the acetoin dehydrogenase complex, following a mechanism largely analogous to the pyruvate dehydrogenase complex; however, as acetoin is not a 2-oxoacid, it does not undergo decarboxylation by the E1 enzyme; instead, a molecule of acetaldehyde is released. In some bacteria, acetoin can also be reduced to 2,3-butanediol by acetoin reductase/2,3-butanediol dehydrogenase.

The Voges–Proskauer test is a commonly used microbiological test for acetoin production.

== Uses ==
=== Food ingredients ===
Acetoin, along with diacetyl, is one of the compounds that gives butter its characteristic flavor. Because of this, manufacturers of partially hydrogenated oils typically add artificial butter flavor – acetoin and diacetyl – (along with beta carotene for the yellow color) to the final product.

Acetoin can be found in apples, yogurt, asparagus, blackcurrants, blackberries, wheat, broccoli, brussels sprouts, cantaloupes, and maple syrup.

Acetoin is used as a food flavoring (in baked goods) and as a fragrance. The aroma is described as sweet, buttery, creamy, dairy, milky, and fatty.

=== Electronic cigarettes ===
It is used in liquids for electronic cigarettes to give a buttery or caramel flavor.

== See also ==
- Diacetyl
- Acetylpropionyl
