= Desulfuromonadales =

Scientific classification
- Domain: Bacteria
- Kingdom: Pseudomonadati
- Phylum: Thermodesulfobacteriota
- Class: Desulfuromonadia
- Order: Desulfuromonadales corrig. Kuever et al. 2006

Families
- Desulfuromonadaceae; Geoalkalibacteraceae; Geopsychrobacteraceae; Geothermobacteraceae; ?Pelobacteraceae; Syntrophotaleaceae; "Trichloromonadaceae"

Order of bacteria

The Desulfuromonadales are an order within the Thermodesulfobacteriota. Various members of the Desulfomonadales are capable of anaerobic respiration utilizing a variety of compounds as electron acceptors, including sulfur, Mn(IV), Fe(III), nitrate, Co(III), Tc(VII), U(VI) and trichloroacetic acid

== Phylogeny ==
The currently accepted taxonomy is based on the List of Prokaryotic names with Standing in Nomenclature (LPSN) and National Center for Biotechnology Information (NCBI).

16S rRNA based LTP_10_2024

- - Desulfuromonas palmitatis Coates et al. 2000
  - - "Trichloromonadaceae"
    - - Syntrophotaleaceae
      - - Geoalkalibacteraceae
        - - Desulfuromonadaceae
          - - Geothermobacteraceae
            - Geopsychrobacteraceae [incl. Pelobacteraceae]

120 marker proteins based GTDB 10-RS226

- - Geoalkalibacteraceae Waite et al. 2020
  - - - Syntrophotaleaceae Waite et al. 2020
      - - "Deferrimonas" Waite et al. 2020 {WTL}
        - - "Desulfuromonas versatilis" Xie et al. 2021 {NIT-T3}
          - Trichloromonadaceae Waite et al. 2025
    - - Geothermobacteraceae Waite et al. 2020
      - - Desulfuromonadaceae corrig. Kuever, Rainey & Widdel 2006
        - Geopsychrobacteraceae Waite et al. 2020

== See also ==
- List of bacterial orders
- List of bacteria genera
