= C10H10O =

The molecular formula C_{10}H_{10}O (molar mass: 146.19 g/mol, exact mass: 146.0732 u) may refer to:

- Benzylideneacetone
- Tetralones
  - 1-Tetralone
  - 2-Tetralone
