= Zonaria (disambiguation) =

Zonaria is a Swedish death metal band.

Zonaria may also refer to:

- Zonaria (alga), a genus of thalloid brown alga
- Zonaria (gastropod), a genus of marine gastropod mollusks
