= Phloroglucinol =

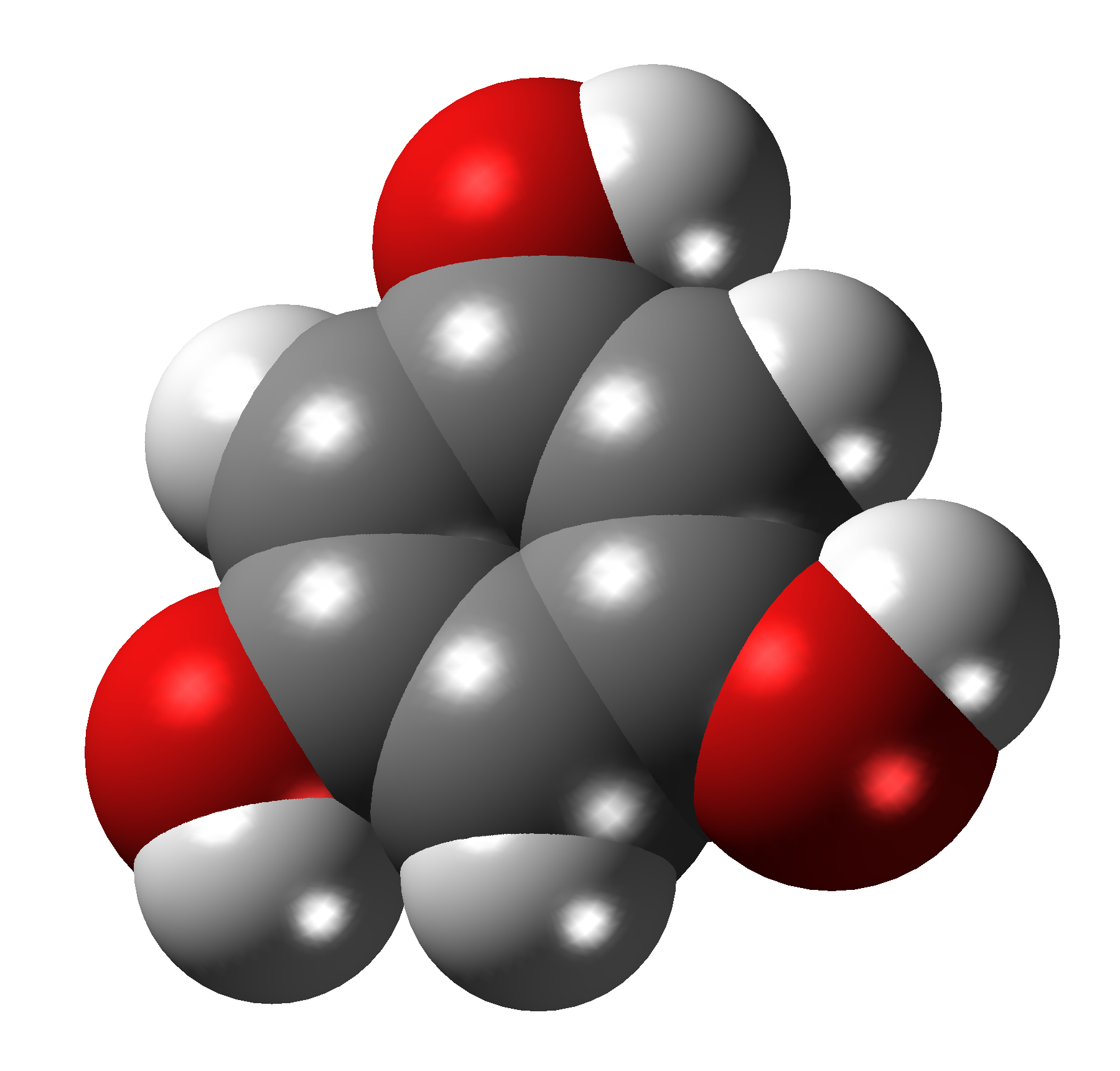

Names
- Preferred IUPAC name Benzene-1,3,5-triol
- Other names phloroglucine, 1,3,5-benzenetriol, 1,3,5-trihydroxybenzene or cyclohexane-1,3,5-trione

Identifiers
CAS Number	108-73-6
3D model (JSmol)	Interactive image
ChEBI	CHEBI:16204
ChEMBL	ChEMBL473159
ChemSpider	352
ECHA InfoCard	100.003.284
EC Number	203-611-2
KEGG	D00152; C02183
PubChem CID	359
RTECS number	UX1050000
UNII	DHD7FFG6YS
CompTox Dashboard (EPA)	DTXSID9048354
- InChI: InChI=1S/C6H6O3/c7-4-1-5(8)3-6(9)2-4/h1-3,7-9H Key: QCDYQQDYXPDABM-UHFFFAOYSA-N; InChI=1/C6H6O3/c7-4-1-5(8)3-6(9)2-4/h1-3,7-9H Key: QCDYQQDYXPDABM-UHFFFAOYAF
- SMILES: c1c(cc(cc1O)O)O

Properties
Chemical formula	C_{6}H_{6}O_{3}
Molar mass	126.111 g·mol^{−1}
Appearance	colorless to beige solid
Melting point	219 °C (426 °F; 492 K)
Solubility in water	1 g/100 mL
Solubility	soluble in diethyl ether, ethanol, pyridine
Acidity (pK_{a})	8.45
Magnetic susceptibility (χ)	−73.4×10^{−6} cm^{3}/mol

Pharmacology
ATC code	A03AX12 (WHO)

Hazards
- GHS labelling
Pictograms	(GHS07: Exclamation mark)
Signal word	Warning
Hazard statements	H412
Precautionary statements	P273, P501
- Lethal dose or concentration (LD, LC)
LD_{50} (median dose)	5 g/kg (rat, oral)
- Except where otherwise noted, data are given for materials in their standard state (at 25 °C [77 °F], 100 kPa). verify (what is ?) Infobox references

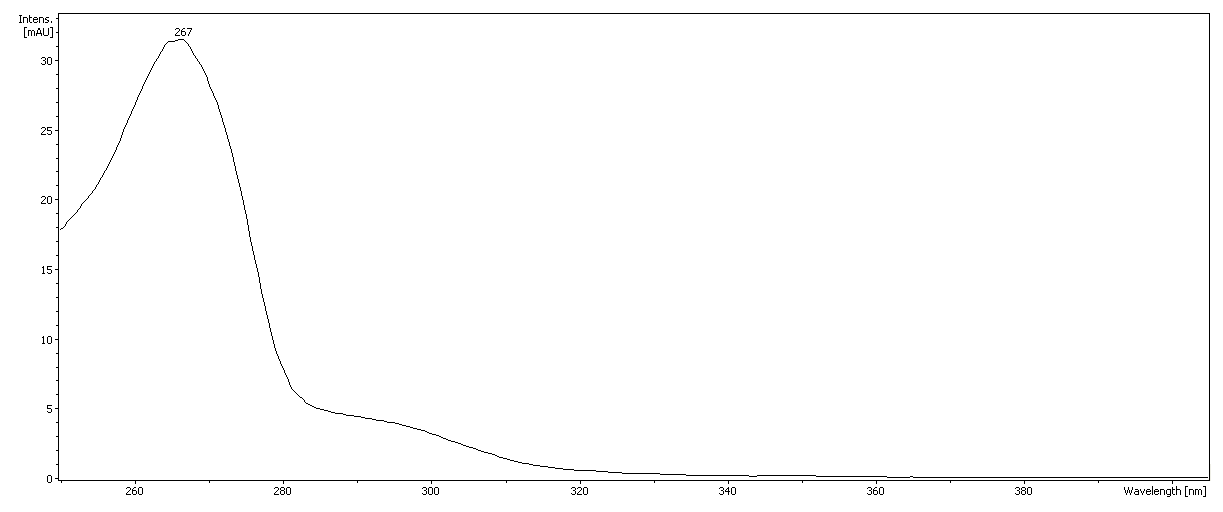
UV visible spectrum of phloroglucinol

Phloroglucinol is an organic compound with the formula C_{6}H_{3}(OH)_{3}. It is a colorless solid. It is used in the synthesis of pharmaceuticals and explosives. Phloroglucinol is one of three isomeric benzenetriols. The other two isomers are hydroxyquinol (1,2,4-benzenetriol) and pyrogallol (1,2,3-benzenetriol). Phloroglucinol, and its benzenetriol isomers, are still defined as "phenols" according to the IUPAC official nomenclature rules of chemical compounds. Many such monophenolics are often termed polyphenols. The enzyme is biosynthesized by phloroglucinol synthase.

== Synthesis and occurrence ==
In 1855, phloroglucinol was first prepared from phloretin by the Austrian chemist Heinrich Hlasiwetz (1825–1875).

A modern synthesis of phloroglucinol involves hydrolysis of benzene-1,3,5-triamine and its derivatives. Representative is the following route from trinitrobenzene.

The synthesis is noteworthy because ordinary aniline derivatives are unreactive toward hydroxide. Because the benzene-1,3,5-triamine also exists as its imine tautomer, it is susceptible to hydrolysis.

== Reactions ==
=== Tautomerism and acid-base behavior ===
Phloroglucinol is a weak triprotic acid. The first two pK_{a}s are 8.5 and 8.9.

Phloroglucinol behaves as a mixture with the keto tautomers. Evidence for this equilibrium is provided by the formation of the oxime:

C_{6}H_{3}(OH)_{3} + 3 NH_{2}OH → (CH_{2})_{3}(C=NOH)_{3} + 3 H_{2}O

But it behaves also like a benzenetriol as the three hydroxyl groups can be methylated to give 1,3,5-trimethoxybenzene.

For the neutral compound, the keto tautomers are undetectable spectroscopically. Upon deprotonation, the keto tautomer predominates.

=== Other reactions ===
From water, phloroglucinol crystallizes as the dihydrate, which has a melting point of 116–117 °C, but the anhydrous form melts at a much higher temperature, at 218–220 °C. It does not boil intact, but it does sublime.

The Hoesch reaction allows the synthesis of 2,4,6-trihydroxyacetophenone (THAP) from phloroglucinol.

Leptospermone can be synthesized from phloroglucinol by a reaction with isovaleroylnitrile in the presence of a zinc chloride catalyst.

Pentacarbon dioxide, described in 1988 by Günter Maier and others, can be obtained by pyrolysis of 1,3,5-cyclohexanetrione (phloroglucin).

Phloroglucinol readily forms 5-aminoresorcinol (aka phloramine) in aqueous ammonia at low temperatures.

Reaction of phloroglucinol and phloretic acid gives 30% yield of phloretin.

== Natural occurrences ==
Phloroglucinol is also generally found in the flavonoid ring A substitution pattern. Indeed, it was originally prepared from phloretin, a compound isolated from fruit trees, using potassium hydroxide. Additionally, the compound can be similarly prepared from glucosides, plant extracts and resins such as quercetin, catechin and phlobaphenes.

Phloroglucinols are secondary metabolites that occur naturally in certain plant species. It is also produced by brown algae and bacteria.

Acyl derivatives are present in the fronds of the coastal woodfern, Dryopteris arguta or in Dryopteris crassirhizoma. The anthelmintic activity of the root of Dryopteris filix-mas has been claimed to be due to flavaspidic acid, a phloroglucinol derivative.

Formylated phloroglucinol compounds (euglobals, macrocarpals and sideroxylonals) can be found in Eucalyptus species. Hyperforin and adhyperforin are two phloroglucinols found in St John's wort. Humulone is a phloroglucinol derivative with three isoprenoid side-chains. Two side-chains are prenyl groups and one is an isovaleryl group. Humulone is a bitter-tasting chemical compound found in the resin of mature hops (Humulus lupulus).

Brown algae, such as Ecklonia stolonifera, Eisenia bicyclis or species in the genus Zonaria, produce phloroglucinol and phloroglucinol derivatives. Brown algae also produce a type of tannins known as phlorotannins.

The bacterium Pseudomonas fluorescens produces phloroglucinol, phloroglucinol carboxylic acid and diacetylphloroglucinol.

== Biosynthesis ==
Activated 3,5-diketoheptanedioate.

In Pseudomonas fluorescens, biosynthesis of phloroglucinol is performed with a type III polyketide synthase. The synthesis begins with the condensation of three malonyl-CoAs. Then decarboxylation followed by the cyclization of the activated 3,5-diketoheptanedioate product leads to the formation of phloroglucinol.

The enzyme pyrogallol hydroxytransferase uses 1,2,3,5-tetrahydroxybenzene and 1,2,3-trihydroxybenzene (pyrogallol) to produce 1,3,5-trihydroxybenzene (phloroglucinol) and 1,2,3,5-tetrahydroxybenzene. It is found in the bacterium species Pelobacter acidigallici.

The enzyme phloroglucinol reductase uses dihydrophloroglucinol and NADP^{+} to produce phloroglucinol, NADPH, and H^{+}. It is found in the bacterium species Eubacterium oxidoreducens.

The legume-root nodulating, microsymbiotic nitrogen-fixing bacterium species Bradyrhizobium japonicum is able to degrade catechin with formation of phloroglucinol carboxylic acid, further decarboxylated to phloroglucinol, which is dehydroxylated to resorcinol and hydroxyquinol.

Phloretin hydrolase uses phloretin and water to produce phloretate and phloroglucinol.

== Health effects ==
In some countries and in veterinary medicine, phloroglucinol is used as a treatment for gallstones, spasmodic pain and other related gastrointestinal disorders. A 2018 review found insufficient evidence that phloroglucinol was effective for treating abdominal pain. A 2020 review found insufficient evidence that phloroglucinol was effective for treating pain caused by obstetric and gynecological conditions. A 2022 phase 3 study conducted in Italy on 364 patients indicated phloroglucinol and its derivative must be as effective as nonsteroidal anti-inflammatory drugs for the treatment of pain and spasms of biliary or urinary tracts.

Phloroglucinols acylated derivatives have a fatty acid synthase inhibitory activity.

=== ATC classification ===
It has the A03AX12 code in the A03AX Other drugs for functional bowel disorders section of the ATC code A03 Drugs for functional gastrointestinal disorders subgroup of the Anatomical Therapeutic Chemical Classification System. It also has the D02.755.684 code in the D02 Organic chemicals section of the Medical Subject Headings (MeSH) codes by the United States National Library of Medicine.

== Applications ==
Phloroglucinol is mainly used as a coupling agent in printing. It links diazo dyes to give a fast black.

It is useful for the industrial synthesis of pharmaceuticals (Flopropione), Phloretin, and explosives (TATB (2,4,6-triamino-1,3,5-trinitrobenzene), trinitrophloroglucinol, 1,3,5-trinitrobenzene).

Phloroglucinolysis is an analytical technique to study condensed tannins by means of depolymerisation. The reaction makes use of phloroglucinol as nucleophile. Phlobaphenes formation (tannins condensation and precipitation) can be minimized in using strong nucleophiles, such as phloroglucinol, during pine tannins extraction.

Phloroglucinol is used in plant culture media. It demonstrates both cytokinin-like and auxin-like activity. Phloroglucinol increases shoot formation and somatic embryogenesis in several horticultural and grain crops. When added to rooting media together with auxin, phloroglucinol further stimulates rooting.

=== Use in tests ===
Phloroglucinol is a reagent of the Tollens' test for pentoses. This test relies on reaction of the furfural with phloroglucinol to produce a colored compound with high molar absorptivity.

A solution of hydrochloric acid and phloroglucinol is also used for the detection of lignin (Wiesner test). A brilliant red color develops, owing to the presence of coniferaldehyde groups in the lignin. A similar test can be performed with tolonium chloride.

It is also part of Gunzburg reagent, an alcoholic solution of phloroglucinol and vanillin, for the qualitative detection of free hydrochloric acid in gastric juice.
