= Eubacterium oxidoreducens =

Scientific classification
- Domain: Bacteria
- Kingdom: Bacillati
- Phylum: Bacillota
- Class: Clostridia
- Order: Eubacteriales
- Family: Eubacteriaceae
- Genus: Eubacterium
- Species: E. oxidoreducens

Binomial name
- Eubacterium oxidoreducens Krumholz and Bryant, 1986

Species of bacterium

Eubacterium oxidoreducens is a Gram positive bacterium species in the genus Eubacterium.

1,2,3,5-Tetrahydroxybenzene is a benzenetetrol and a metabolite in the degradation of 3,4,5-trihydroxybenzoate by E. oxidoreducens.

The enzyme phloroglucinol reductase uses dihydrophloroglucinol and NADP^{+} to produce phloroglucinol, NADPH, and H^{+}. It is found in E. oxidoreducens.
