= Tetralone =

Tetralone may refer to either of two chemical isomers:

- 1-Tetralone
- 2-Tetralone
