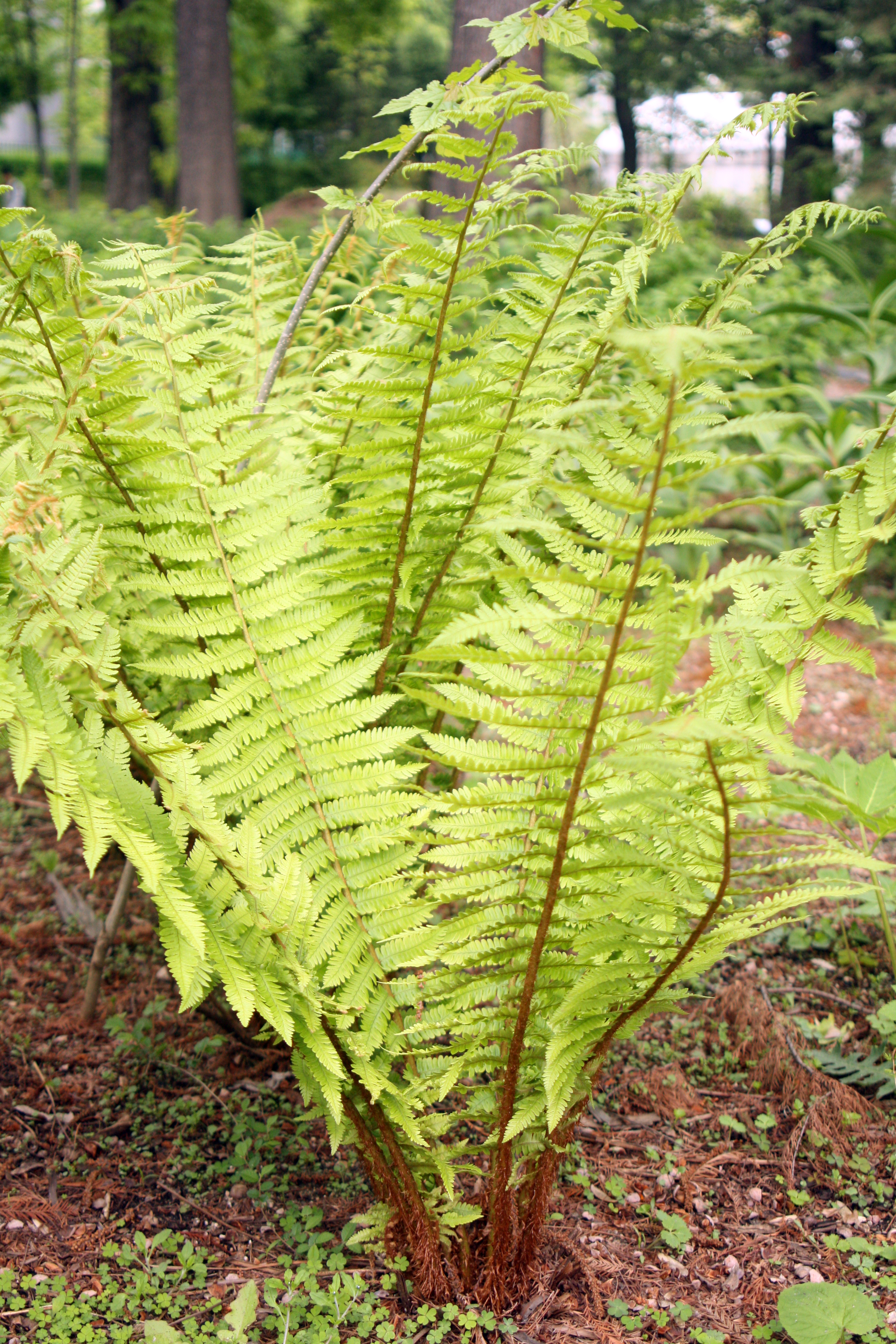
- Dryopteris crassirhizoma in Seoul, Korea

Scientific classification
- Kingdom: Plantae
- Clade: Tracheophytes
- Division: Polypodiophyta
- Class: Polypodiopsida
- Order: Polypodiales
- Suborder: Polypodiineae
- Family: Dryopteridaceae
- Genus: Dryopteris
- Species: D. crassirhizoma

Binomial name
- Dryopteris crassirhizoma Nakai (1920)

= Dryopteris crassirhizoma =

Species of fern

Dryopteris crassirhizoma is a fern species in the wood fern family Dryopteridaceae.

This semi-evergreen fern grows to 1 m (3.3 ft) tall and broad, with narrowly divided fronds growing in a vase-like shape from a central crown, which is brown in colour.

It has gained the Royal Horticultural Society's Award of Garden Merit.

The acylphloroglucinols (flavaspidic acids) isolated from D. crassirhizoma show in vitro antibacterial and fatty acid synthase inhibitory activity. Also, the constituents sutchuenoside A and kaempferitrin have in vivo antiparasitic activity.

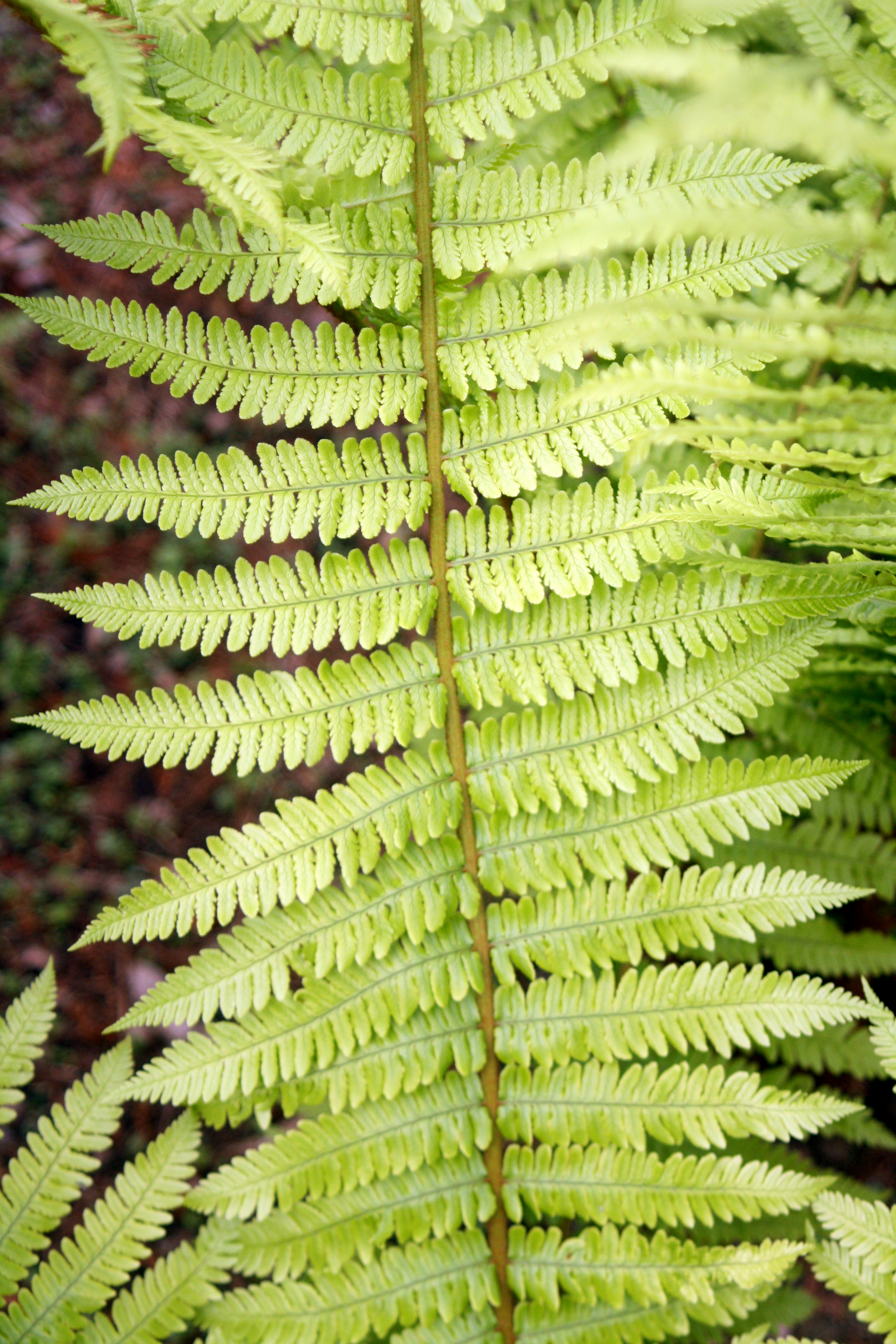
