= Hans Molisch =

Czech-Austrian botanist (1856–1937)

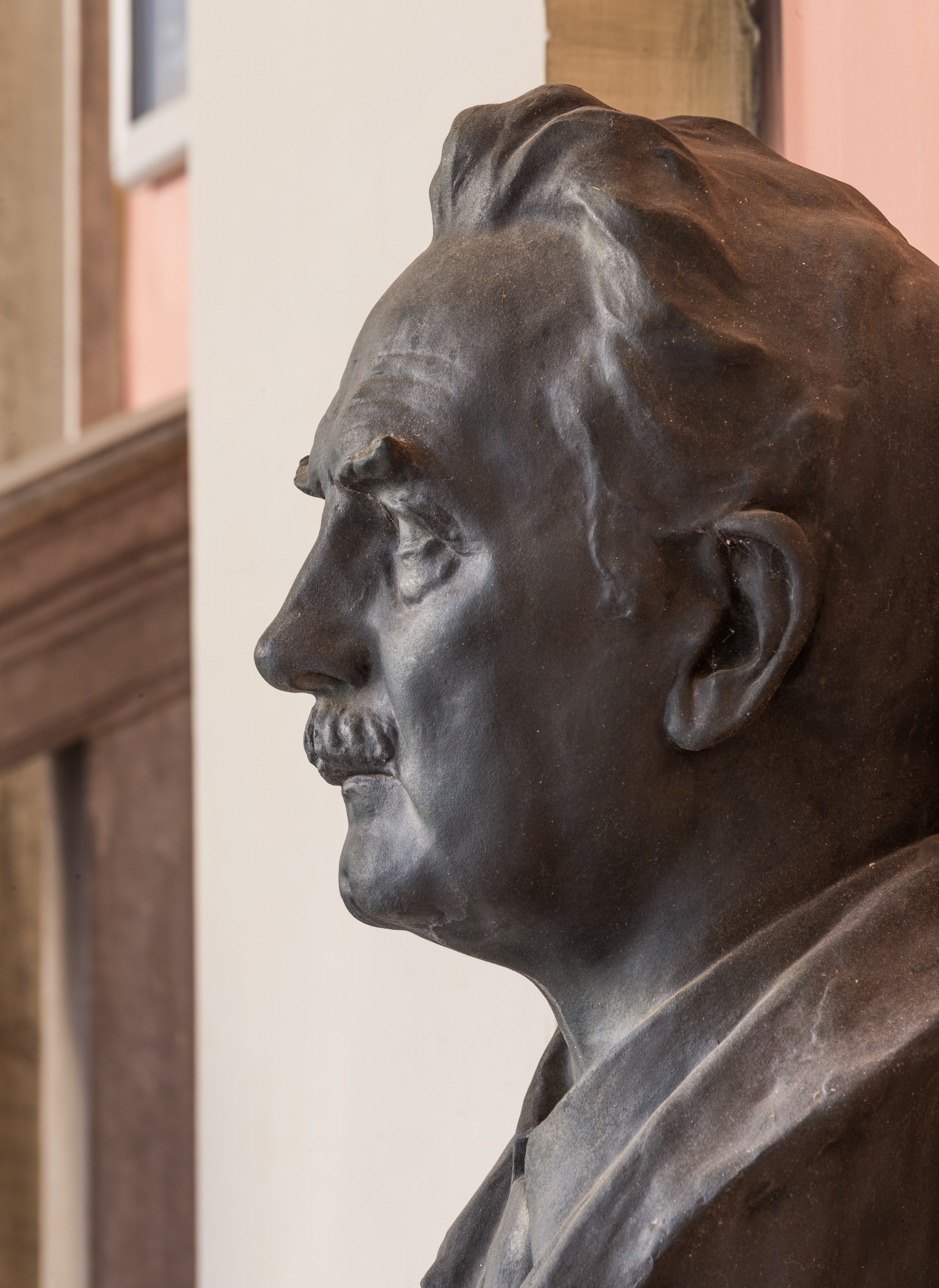
Hans Molisch bust at the University of Vienna

Hans Molisch (6 December 1856, Brünn, Habsburg Moravia – 8 December 1937, Wien, Austria) was a Czech-Austrian botanist.

Molisch's test is named after him, it is a sensitive chemical test for the presence of carbohydrates.

He is attributed as being the creator of the term 'Topophysis.'

He taught as a professor at the German University of Prague (1894–), Vienna University (1909–1928), Tohoku Imperial University (now Tohoku University, Japan; 1922–1925), and the Bose Institute in Kolkata India; 1928–.

From 1931 to 1937 he acted as the vice-president of the Austrian Academy of Sciences.

Hans Molisch expanded on Julius von Sachs's work by developing "starch pictures" in intact leaves by using actual photographic negatives as masks over the illuminated leaves.

In his function as rector of the University of Vienna in 1926/27, Molisch was responsible for a wave of radicalization among the antisemitic and German-national students. The escalating violence against politically dissenters in general and Jewish students in particular was promoted by Molisch and demonstrated by appropriate leniency in punishing the perpetrators. At the university he was considered an open sponsor of the "swastika people".

== Literary works ==
- Die Pflanzen in ihren Beziehungen zum Eisen, 1892
- Leuchtende Pflanzen, 1904
- Die Purpurbakterien, 1907
- Die Eisenbakterien, 1910
- Mikrochemie der Pflanzen, 1913
- Pflanzenphysiologie, 1920
- Pflanzenphysiologie in Japan, 1926
- Im Lande der aufgehenden Sonne, 1927
