= Dihydrophloroglucinol =

Names
- Preferred IUPAC name 3,5-Dihydroxycyclohex-2-en-1-one
- Other names 1,3-Dioxo-5-hydroxycyclohexane

Identifiers
3D model (JSmol)	Interactive image
ChEBI	CHEBI:16370
ChemSpider	354
KEGG	C06719
PubChem CID	361
CompTox Dashboard (EPA)	DTXSID90635547
- InChI: InChI=1S/C6H8O3/c7-4-1-5(8)3-6(9)2-4/h1,6-7,9H,2-3H2 Key: JUOPGIRJUCFNBD-UHFFFAOYSA-N
- SMILES: C1C(CC(=O)C=C1O)O

Properties
Chemical formula	C_{6}H_{8}O_{3}
Molar mass	128.127 g·mol^{−1}
- Except where otherwise noted, data are given for materials in their standard state (at 25 °C [77 °F], 100 kPa). Infobox references

Dihydrophloroglucinol is a chemical compound found in the pathway of the microbial degradation of phloroglucinol and other phenolic compounds.

The enzyme phloroglucinol reductase uses dihydrophloroglucinol and NADP^{+} to produce phloroglucinol, NADPH, and H^{+}. It is found in the bacterium species Eubacterium oxidoreducens.
