= Gilman test =

The Gilman test is a chemical test for the detection of Grignard reagents and organolithium reagents.

A 0.5 mL sample is added to a 1% solution of Mischler's ketone in benzene or toluene. To this solution is added 1 mL of water for hydrolysis to take place and then several drops of 0.2% iodine in glacial acetic acid. If the color of the resulting solution becomes a greenish-blue then the original sample did contain the organometallic species.
