= Nylander's test =

Chemical test

Nylander's test is a chemical test used for detecting the presence of reducing sugars. Glucose or fructose reduces bismuth oxynitrate to bismuth under alkaline conditions. When Nylander's reagent, which consists of bismuth nitrate, potassium sodium tartrate and potassium hydroxide, is added to a solution with reducing sugars, a black precipitate of metallic bismuth is formed.
