= Rapid furfural test =

Chemical test

The rapid furfural test is a chemical test used to distinguish between glucose and fructose. The rapid furfural test is similar to Molisch's test but uses concentrated hydrochloric acid instead of concentrated sulfuric acid and the solution is boiled. Dilute sugar solution is added to ethanolic 1-naphthol and concentrated hydrochloric acid. The solution is then boiled and if a purple colour forms within thirty seconds, fructose is present. If a purple colour does not appear before thirty seconds, glucose is present.
