= Hopkins–Cole reaction =

Chemical reaction used to detect the presence of tryptophan in proteins

The Hopkins-Cole reaction, also known as the glyoxylic acid reaction, is a chemical test used for detecting the presence of tryptophan in proteins. A protein solution is mixed with Hopkins Cole reagent, which consists of glyoxylic acid. Concentrated sulfuric acid is slowly added to form two layers. A purple ring appears between the two layers if the test is positive for tryptophan. Nitrites, chlorates, nitrates and excess chlorides prevent the reaction from occurring.

The reaction was first reported by Frederick Gowland Hopkins and Sydney W. Cole in 1901, as part of their work on the first isolation of tryptophan itself.
