= Acree–Rosenheim reaction =

Chemical test

The Acree–Rosenheim reaction is a chemical test used for detecting the presence of tryptophan in proteins. A protein mixture is mixed with formaldehyde. Concentrated sulfuric acid is added to form two layers. A purple ring appears between the two layers if the test is positive for tryptophan.

The test is a name reaction, recognizing American biochemist Solomon Farley Acree (1875–1957) at the Johns Hopkins University, and Anglo-German medicinal chemist Otto Rosenheim (1871–1955) at the University of Manchester.

== History ==
The method was originally investigated by Otto Rosenheim while examining and improving on the methods by German British chemist Otto Hehner (1853–1924) that was used to detect formaldehyde in milk by adding sulfuric acid, which produced a blue ring. Acree noticed the reaction's similarities with the Adamkiewicz reaction and that the reaction gave noticeably stronger results for casein. Based on this 1906 research, Acree investigated the reaction in 1907 in the general context of formaldehyde reactions with all forms of protein. He was the first to find the importance of the tryptophan group in the reaction, which can be extracted from casein in milk.

== Reaction ==
The reaction of tryptophan with formaldehyde.

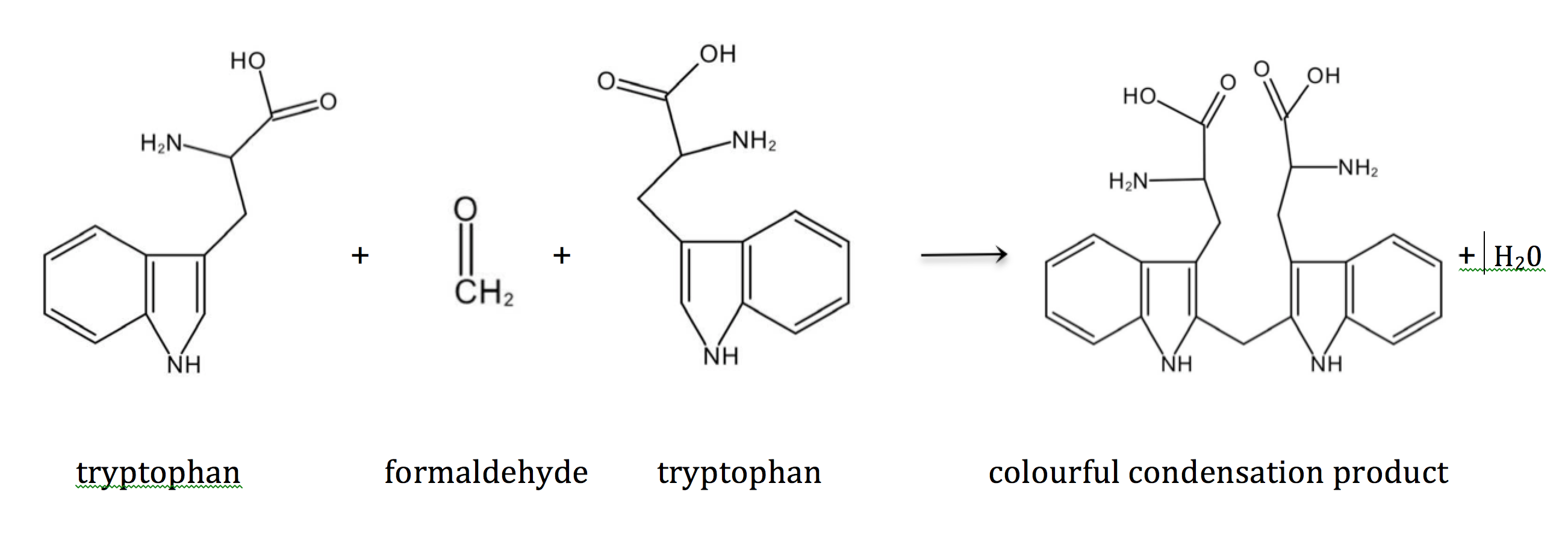
Acree-Rosenheim reaction of tryptophan and formaldehyde
