= Chemical test =

Procedure for identifying or quantifying a chemical compound or group

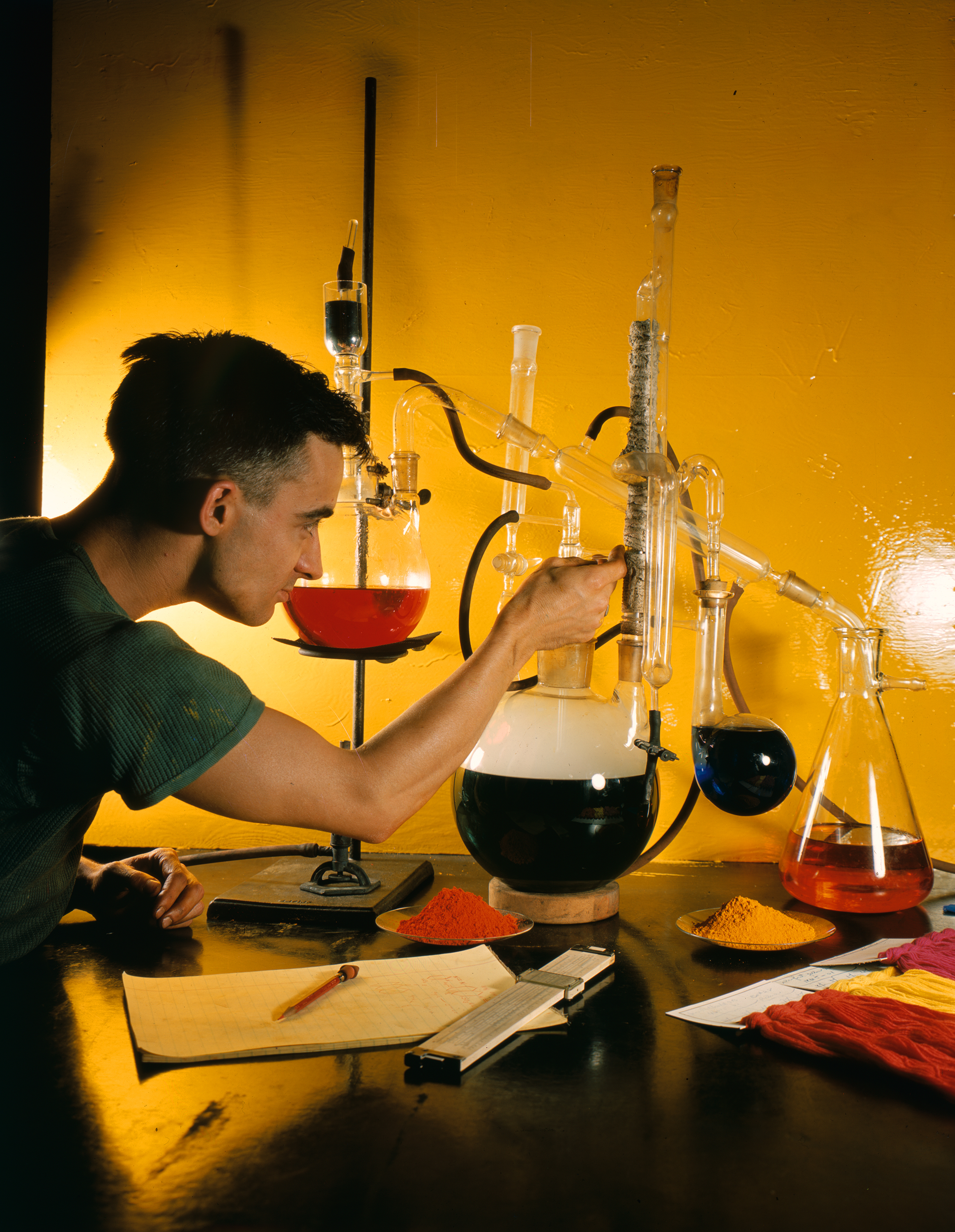
Person performing a chemical test, 1940

In chemistry, a chemical test is a qualitative or quantitative procedure designed to identify, quantify, or characterise a chemical compound or chemical group.

== Purposes ==
Chemical testing might have a variety of purposes, such as to:

- Determine if, or verify that, the requirements of a specification, regulation, or contract are met
- Decide if a new product development program is on track: Demonstrate proof of concept
- Demonstrate the utility of a proposed patent
- Determine the interactions of a sample with other known substances
- Determine the composition of a sample
- Provide standard data for other scientific, medical, and Quality assurance functions
- Validate suitability for end-use
- Provide a basis for Technical communication
- Provide a technical means of comparison of several options
- Provide evidence in legal proceedings

== Biochemical tests ==
- Clinistrips quantitatively test for sugar in urine
- The Kastle-Meyer test tests for the presence of hemoglobin
- Salicylate testing is a category of drug testing that is focused on detecting salicylates such as acetylsalicylic acid for either biochemical or medical purposes.
- The Phadebas test tests for the presence of saliva for forensic purposes
- Iodine solution tests for starch
- The Van Slyke determination tests for specific amino acids
- The Zimmermann test tests for ketosteroids
- Seliwanoff's test differentiates between aldose and ketose sugars
- Test for lipids: add ethanol to sample, then shake; add water to the solution, and shake again. If fat is present, the product turns milky white.
- The Sakaguchi test detects the presence of arginine in protein
- The Hopkins–Cole reaction tests for the presence of tryptophan in proteins
- The nitroprusside reaction tests for the presence of free thiol groups of cysteine in proteins
- The Sullivan reaction tests for the presence of cysteine and cystine in proteins
- The Acree–Rosenheim reaction tests for the presence of tryptophan in proteins
- The Pauly reaction tests for the presence of tyrosine or histidine in proteins
- Heller's test tests for the presence of albumin in urine
- Gmelin's test tests for the presence of bile pigments in urine
- Hay's test tests for the presence of bile pigments in urine

=== Reducing sugars ===
- Barfoed's test tests for reducing polysacchorides or disaccharides
- Benedict's reagent tests for reducing sugars or aldehydes
- Fehling's solution tests for reducing sugars or aldehydes, similar to Benedict's reagent
- Molisch's test tests for carbohydrates
- Nylander's test tests for reducing sugars
- Rapid furfural test distinguishes between glucose and fructose

=== Proteins and polypeptides ===
- The bicinchoninic acid assay tests for proteins
- The Biuret test tests for proteins and polypeptides
- Bradford protein assay measures protein quantitatively
- The Phadebas amylase test determines alpha-amylase activity

== Organic tests ==
- The carbylamine reaction tests for primary amines
- The esterification reaction tests for the presence of alcohol and/or carboxylic acids
- The Griess test tests for organic nitrite compounds
- The 2,4-dinitrophenylhydrazine tests for carbonyl compounds
- The iodoform reaction tests for the presence of methyl ketones, or compounds which can be oxidized to methyl ketones
- The Schiff test detects aldehydes
- Tollens' reagent tests for aldehydes (known as the silver mirror test)
- The Zeisel determination tests for the presence of esters or ethers
- Lucas' reagent is used to distinguish between primary, secondary and tertiary alcohols.
- The bromine test is used to test for the presence of unsaturation and phenols.

== Inorganic tests ==
- Barium chloride tests for sulfates
- Acidified silver nitrate solution tests for halide ions
- The Beilstein test tests for halides qualitatively
- The bead test tests for certain metals
- The Carius halogen method measures halides quantitatively.
- Chemical tests for cyanide test for the presence of cyanide, CN^{−}
- Copper sulfate tests for the presence of water
- Flame tests test for metals
- The Gilman test tests for the presence of a Grignard reagent
- The Kjeldahl method quantitatively determines the presence of nitrogen
- Nessler's reagent tests for the presence of ammonia
- Ninhydrin tests for ammonia or primary amines
- Phosphate tests test for phosphate
- The sodium fusion test tests for the presence of nitrogen, sulfur, and halides in a sample
- The Zerewitinoff determination tests for any acidic hydrogen
- The Oddy test tests for acid, aldehydes, and sulfides
- Gunzberg's test tests for the presence of hydrochloric acid
- Kelling's test tests for the presence of lactic acid

== See also ==
- Independent test organization
- Medical test
- Test method
