= Sakaguchi test =

Chemical test used to detect presence of arginine in proteins

The Sakaguchi test is a chemical test used to detect presence of arginine in proteins. It is named after the Japanese food scientist and organic chemist, Shoyo Sakaguchi (1900–1995) who described the test in 1925. The Sakaguchi reagent used in the test consists of 1-Naphthol and a drop of sodium hypobromite. The guanidino (–C group in arginine reacts with the Sakaguchi reagent to form a red-coloured complex.
