= Gunzberg's test =

Chemical test detecting hydrochloric acid

Gunzberg's test is a chemical test used for detecting the presence of hydrochloric acid. Gunzberg's reagent is made by dissolving two grams of phloroglucinol and one gram of vanillin in 100 millilitres of 95% ethanol. Hydrochloric acid catalyses Gunzberg's reagent to form a red complex.

== Procedure ==
Two drops of gastric juice are mixed with two drops of Gunzberg's reagent in an evaporating dish. The mixture is evaporated and if red is seen, free hydrochloric acid is present.
