= Trinder spot test =

Medical diagnostic test

- Purpose: determine exposure to salicylates

The Trinder spot test is a diagnostic test used in medicine to determine exposure to salicylates, particularly to salicylic acid. The test employs the Trinder reagent (a.k.a. Trinder solution) which is mixed with a patient's urine. The colour change, resulting from the Trinder reaction, is immediate, enabling rapid bedside assessment.

The Trinder solution/reagent is a pre-mixed solution of 10% ferric chloride. It can be prepared by combining 40 g of mercuric chloride and 40 g of ferric nitrate in 850 ml of type II deionized water, and then adding 10 ml of concentrated hydrochloric acid to the solution and diluting to a volume of 1 litre with more type II deionized water.

The test for the Trinder reaction is to mix 1 ml of urine with 1 ml of the Trinder reagent in a test tube. The test is positive if a colour change results. The specific colour changes are:

blue or purple
positive test
no change
negative test
brown
false-positive test caused by the presence of phenothiazines

The test has a sensitivity of 94% and a specificity of 74% for identifying patients whose salicylate concentrations are greater than 30 mg per decilitre (2.17 mmol/L). False positive concentrations (2.8 to 14.3 mg per decilitre) have been reported to occur in neonates with hyperbilirubinemia, premature neonates, and children who are seriously ill (e.g. children who have extensive burns).

The reaction between iron(III) and pharmaceuticals was first adapted for clinical use by P. Trinder (after whom the test, reaction, and reagent are now named), of the Biochemistry Department of the Royal Infirmary in Sunderland, in 1954 (see the article listed in further reading). Salicylic acid, salicylamide, and methyl salicylate all react with iron(III) via the phenol group which is next to their –COOH, –CONH_{2}, or –COOCH_{3} functional groups. The Trinder reaction has been used for the determination of the presence of oxytetracycline in 1991, of ciprofloxacin in 1992, and of norfloxacin in 1993, in each case using a solution of iron(III) in sulphuric acid. It has also been used for the determination of the presence of bromazepam in 1992, using an iron(II) solution in a hydrochloric acid rather than an iron(III) solution.

== See also ==
- Salicylate testing
