= Molisch's test =

Chemical test for the presence of carbohydrates

- Classification: Colorimetric method
- Analytes: Carbohydrates

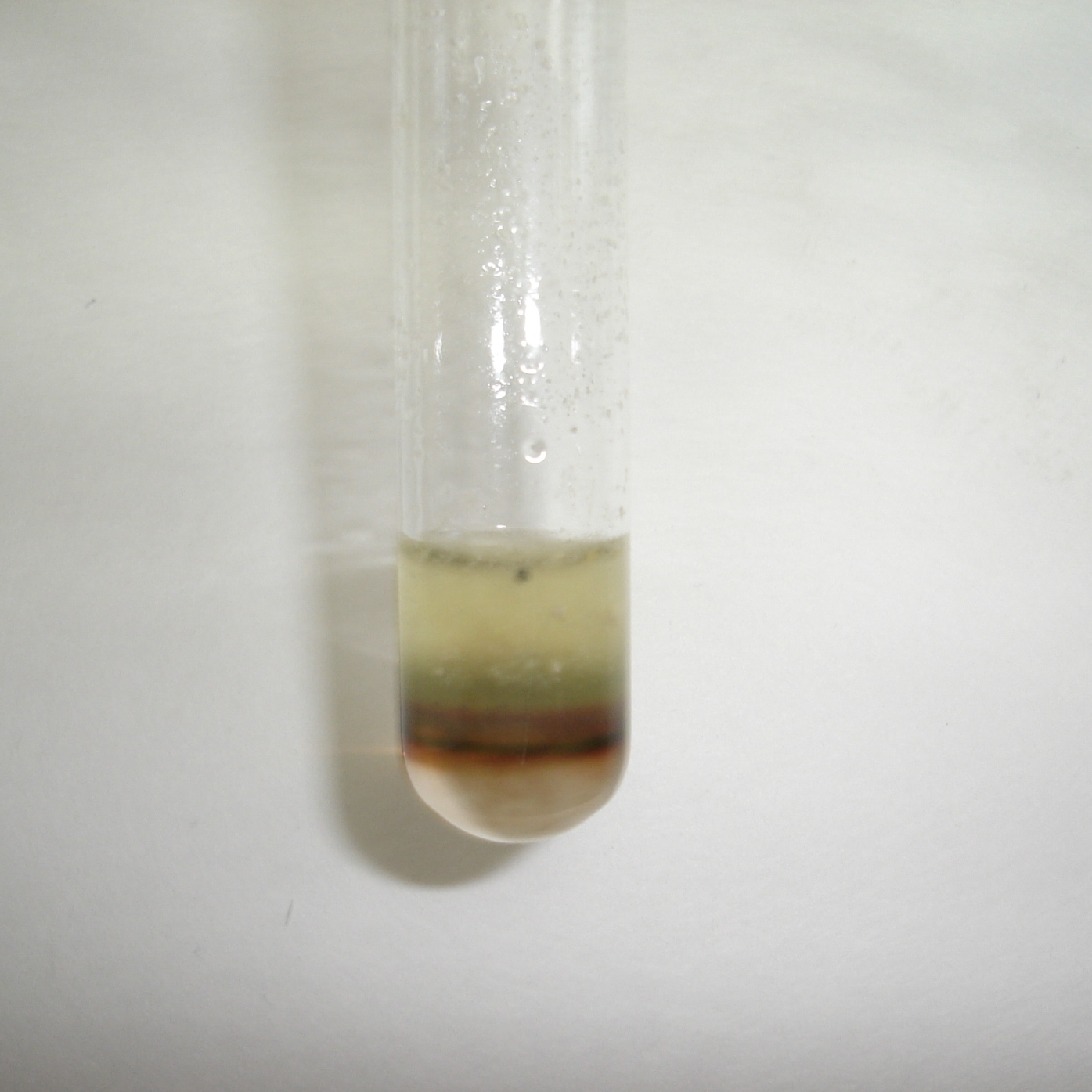
Molisch test (using α-napthol) indicating a positive result (see purple ring).

Molisch's test is a sensitive chemical test, named after Austrian botanist Hans Molisch, for the presence of carbohydrates, based on the dehydration of the carbohydrate by sulfuric acid or hydrochloric acid to produce an aldehyde, which condenses with two molecules of a phenol (usually α-naphthol, though other phenols such as resorcinol and thymol also give colored products), resulting in a violet ring.

== Procedure ==
The test solution is combined with a small amount of Molisch's reagent (α-naphthol dissolved in ethanol) in a test tube. After mixing, a small amount of concentrated sulfuric acid is slowly added down the sides of the sloping test-tube, without mixing, to form a layer. A positive reaction is indicated by appearance of a purple red ring at the interface between the acid and test layers.

== Reaction ==
All carbohydrates – monosaccharides, disaccharides, and polysaccharides (except trioses and tetroses)– should give a positive reaction, and nucleic acids and glycoproteins also give a positive reaction, as all these compounds are eventually hydrolyzed to monosaccharides by strong mineral acids. Pentoses are then dehydrated to furfural, while hexoses are dehydrated to 5-hydroxymethylfurfural. Either of these aldehydes, if present, will condense with two molecules of α-naphthol to form a purple-colored product, as illustrated below by the example of glucose:

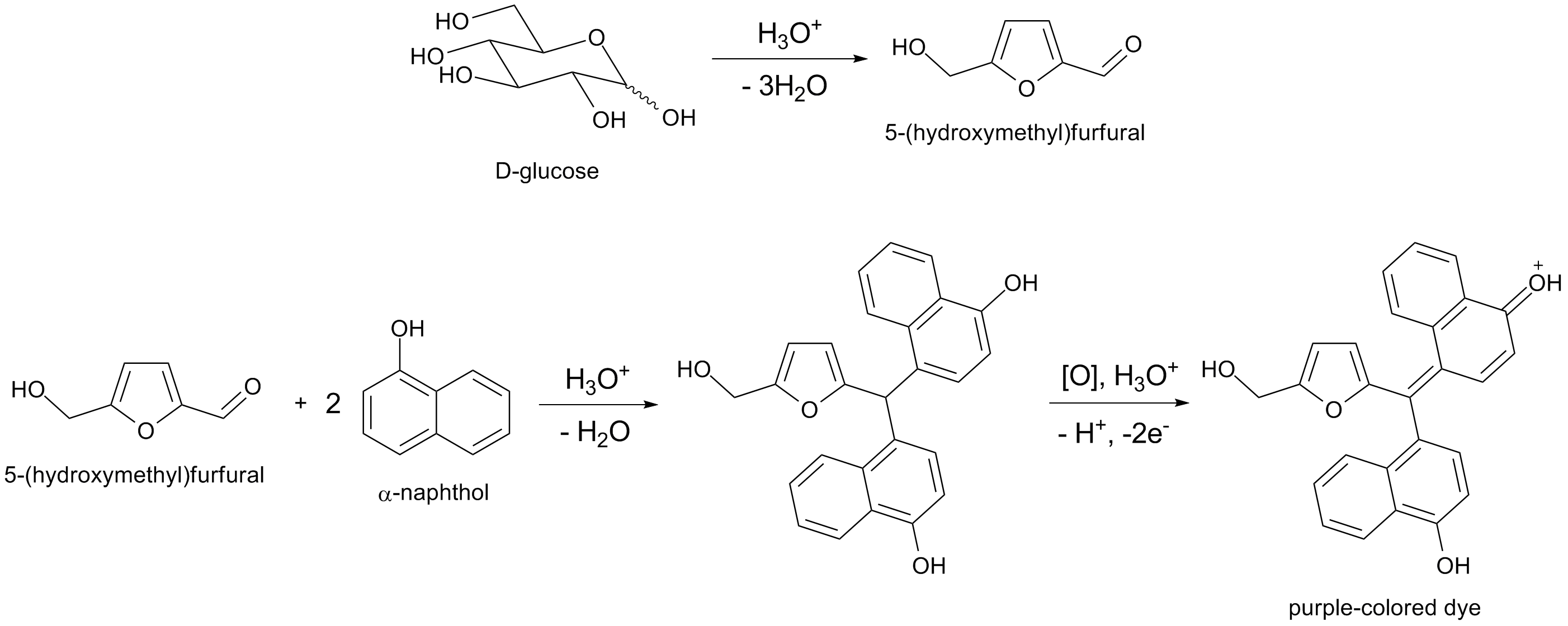

== See also ==
- Rapid furfural test
