= Phloroglucinol synthase =

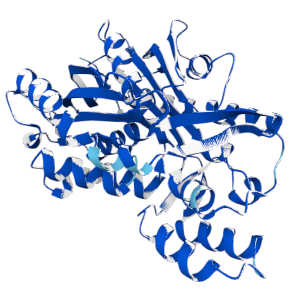
- The enzyme as folded by AlphaFold

Identifiers
- EC no.: 2.3.1.253

Databases
- IntEnz: IntEnz view
- BRENDA: BRENDA entry
- ExPASy: NiceZyme view
- KEGG: KEGG entry
- MetaCyc: metabolic pathway
- PRIAM: profile
- PDB structures: RCSB PDB PDBe PDBsum
Search
- PMC: articles
- PubMed: articles
- NCBI: proteins

Phloroglucinol synthase is an acetyltransferase enzyme involved in the synthesis of phloroglucinol (also known as 1,3,5-trihydroxybenzene or cyclohexane-1,3,5-trione), a pharmaceutically and industrially important benzentriol molecule used in medicines and explosives. The enzyme, as taken from the bacterium pseudomonas protegens (Pf-5), is a type III polyketide synthase. The enzyme cyclizes the activated form of 3,5-dioxoheptanedioate. Phloroglucinol synthase exhibits broad substrate specificity, able to accept C4-C12 aliphatic acyl-CoAs and phenylacetyl-CoAs, yielding polyoxoalkylated alpha-pyrones by condensation with malonyl-CoA. The enzyme catalyzes the following reaction,

3 malonyl-CoA + 3 H^{+} = Phloroglucinol + 3 CO_{2} + 3 CoA

It was shown that the k_{cat} for this enzyme (with malony-CoA as a substrate) was 10 min^{−1}. Its product, phloroglucinol is used in industry as well as in the synthesis of pharmaceuticals. It can be used to make phloroglucinol but it shows low productivity.
