= Topophysis =

Plant growth behavior

Topophysis occurs when scions (young shoots and twigs), buddings, or root cuttings continue to grow in the same way after grafting as they had while growing on the ortet.

When the scion or propagule grows in the same branchlike way, it is called plagiotropic growth. Orthotropic growth is when the scion begins to grow in the same upward manner as the ortet. The duration of plagiotropic growth habit depends on the tree species and developmental stage (whether bud or scion) when cut, before the ramet changes to orthotropic growth and matures. This maturation is dependent on the position of the scion growth in relation to the axillary buds. The rate of maturation is decreased in lateral shoots for every order they are removed from the apical meristem and the total distance grown from the apical meristem.

Hans Molisch first introduced the term topophysis in 1915 in response to Hermann Vöchting's 1904 Araucaria excelsa cutting propagation experiment. Vöchting recorded that cuttings from the terminal shoots immediately developed into normal plants with orthotropic growth. Cuttings from the first order lateral branches first developed into plants resembling side branches (plagiotropic growth) before growing orthotropically. Cuttings from the second order lateral branches grew into horizontal shoots with no side branches for the longest time before growing orthotropically. He concluded that the onset of axillary bud growth is mainly affected by the position relative to the ortets axillary bud.

William J. Robbins addressed the nature of topophysis in a 1964 paper in which he considered it to be a matter of somatic inheritance. See "Topophysis, a problem in somatic inheritance". Proc. Am. Philos. Soc. 108: 395–403.
