= Zeisel determination =

The Zeisel determination or Zeisel test is a chemical test for the presence of esters or ethers in a chemical substance.

It is named after the Czech chemist Simon Zeisel (1854–1933). In a qualitative test a sample is first reacted with a mixture of acetic acid and hydrogen iodide in a test tube. The ensuing reaction results in the cleavage of the ether or the ester into an alkyl iodide and respectively an alcohol or a carboxylic acid.

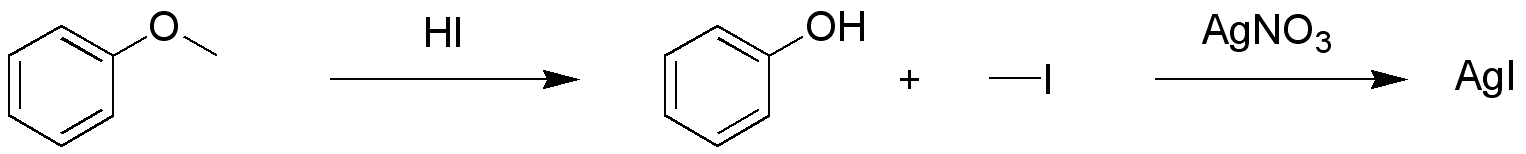
Zeisel determination

By heating this mixture, the gases are allowed to come into contact with a piece of paper higher up the test tube saturated with silver nitrate. Any alkyl iodide present will give a reaction with the silver compound to silver iodide which has a red or yellow color. By filtering and weighing this precipitate it is possible to quantitatively calculate the number of iodine atoms and hence alkoxy groups. For example, prior to the development of the more precise methods of NMR spectroscopy and mass spectrometry, the Zeisel test was widely used to determine the number of methoxy (-OCH_{3}) and ethoxy (-OCH_{2}CH_{3}) groups in carbohydrate and organophosphorus insecticides.

An alternative qualitative Zeisel test can be done with the use of mercury(II) nitrate instead of silver nitrate, leading to the formation of scarlet red mercury(II) iodide.

Synthetic applications:

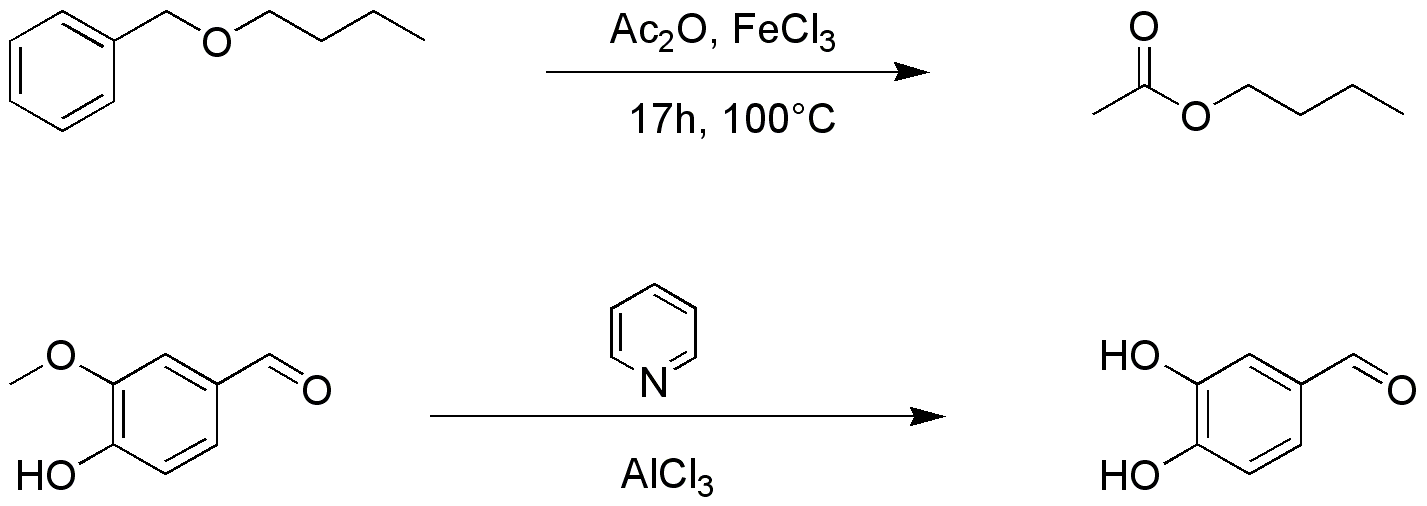
Zeisel determination
