= Hay's test =

Chemical test used to detect the presence of bile salts in urine

Hay's test, also known as Hay's sulphur powder test, is a chemical test used for detecting the presence of bile salts in urine.

== Procedure ==
Sulphur powder is sprinkled into a test tube with three millilitres of urine and if the test is positive, the sulphur powder sinks to the bottom of the test tube. Sulphur powder sinks because bile salts decrease the surface tension of urine.
