= Kelling's test =

Chemical test for lactic acid in gastric juices

Kelling's test is a chemical test used for detecting the presence of lactic acid in gastric juice.

== Procedure ==
Two drops of iron(III) chloride are added to a test tube with distilled water. After mixing, it is divided into two parts. Add one millilitre of gastric juice in one test tube and the same volume of distilled water in the other test tube, which is acting as a control. The test tube with the gastric juice turns yellow in the presence of lactic acid due to the formation of ferric lactate.
