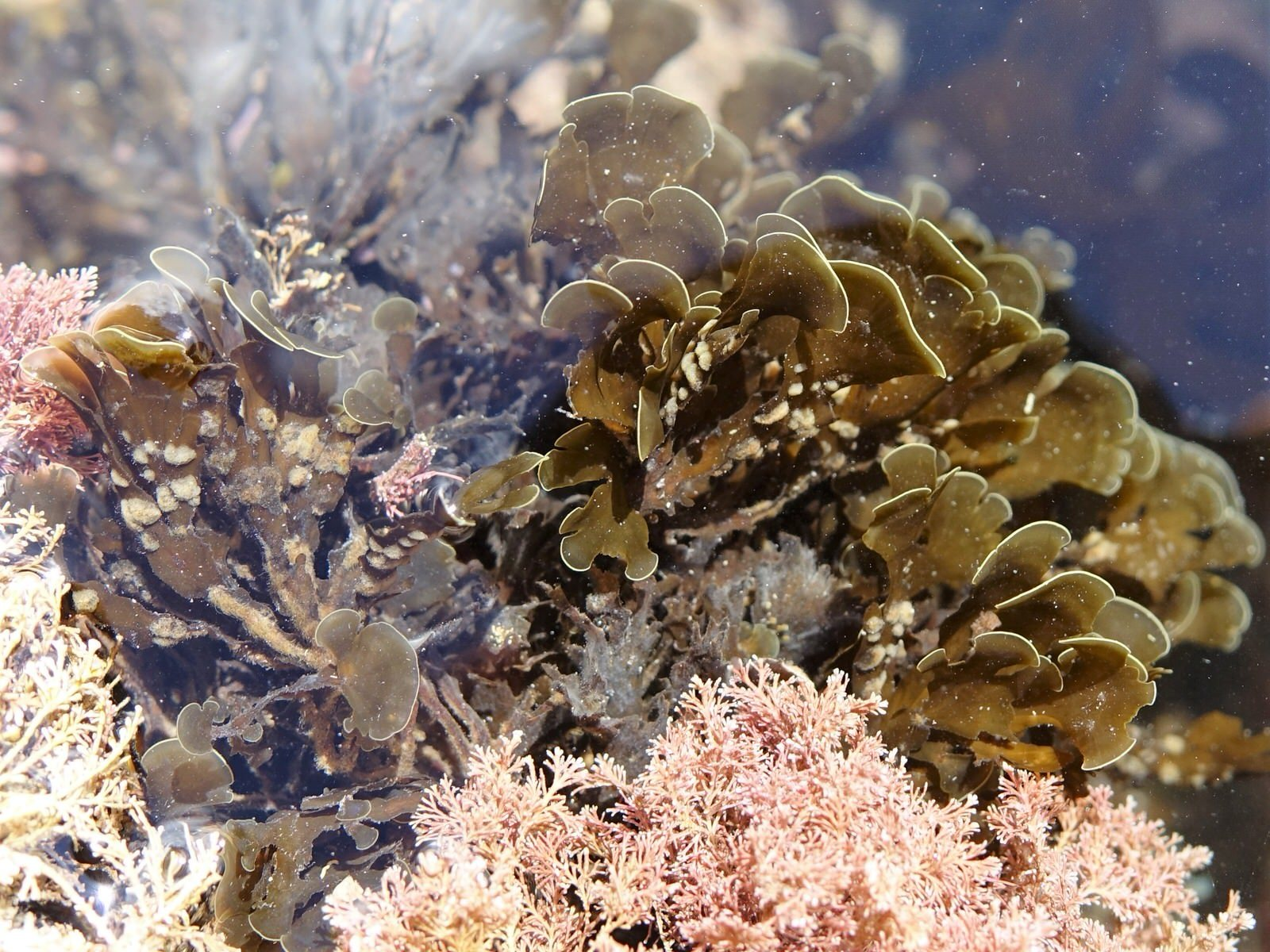
- Zonaria aureomarginata in Long Bay, Auckland

Conservation status
- Not Threatened (NZ TCS)

Scientific classification
- Domain: Eukaryota
- Clade: Sar
- Clade: Stramenopiles
- Division: Ochrophyta
- Class: Phaeophyceae
- Order: Dictyotales
- Family: Dictyotaceae
- Genus: Zonaria
- Species: Z. aureomarginata

Binomial name
- Zonaria aureomarginata J.A. Phillips & W.A.Nelson, 1998

= Zonaria aureomarginata =

Species of seaweed endemic to New Zealand

Zonaria aureomarginata is a species of brown algae in the family Dictyotaceae. It was originally described in 1998. It is endemic to New Zealand. Z. aureomarginata can be found near Manawatāwhi / Three Kings Islands, the North Island, the northern parts of the South Island as well as at the Chatham Islands. It inhabits the intertidal zone to the upper subtital zone at depths of between 1 and 5m and can be found on rugged reefs as well as in exposed coastal tidal pools. As at 2019 this species has a New Zealand Threat classification status of "Not Threatened".

== Taxonomy ==
Z. aureomarginata was first described in 1998 by Julie A. Phillips and Wendy Nelson. The holotype specimen is held at Te Papa. The type locality of Z. aureomarginata is Island Bay, Wellington. Aureomarginata means 'golden margins' in Latin.

== Description ==
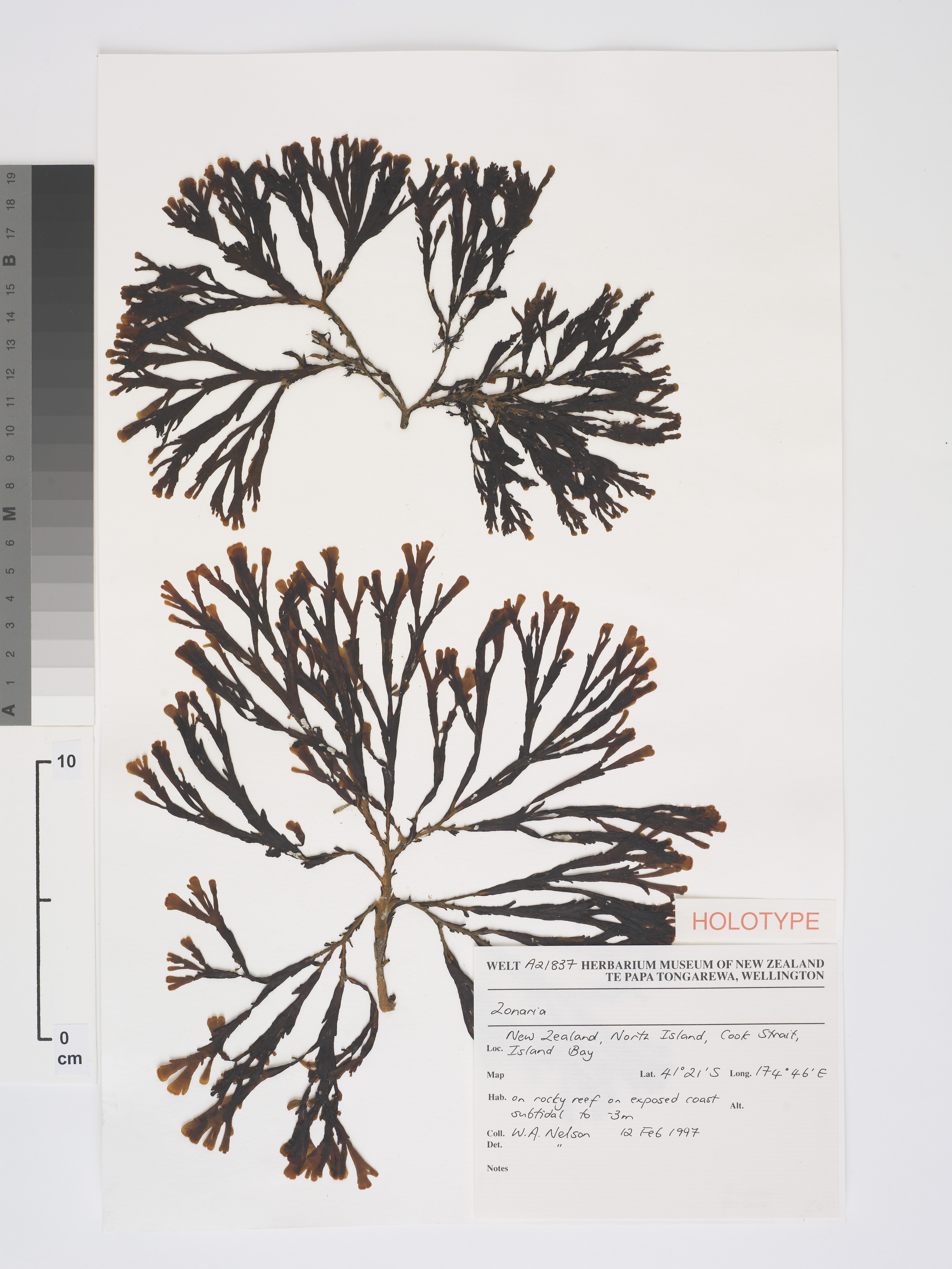
Holotype

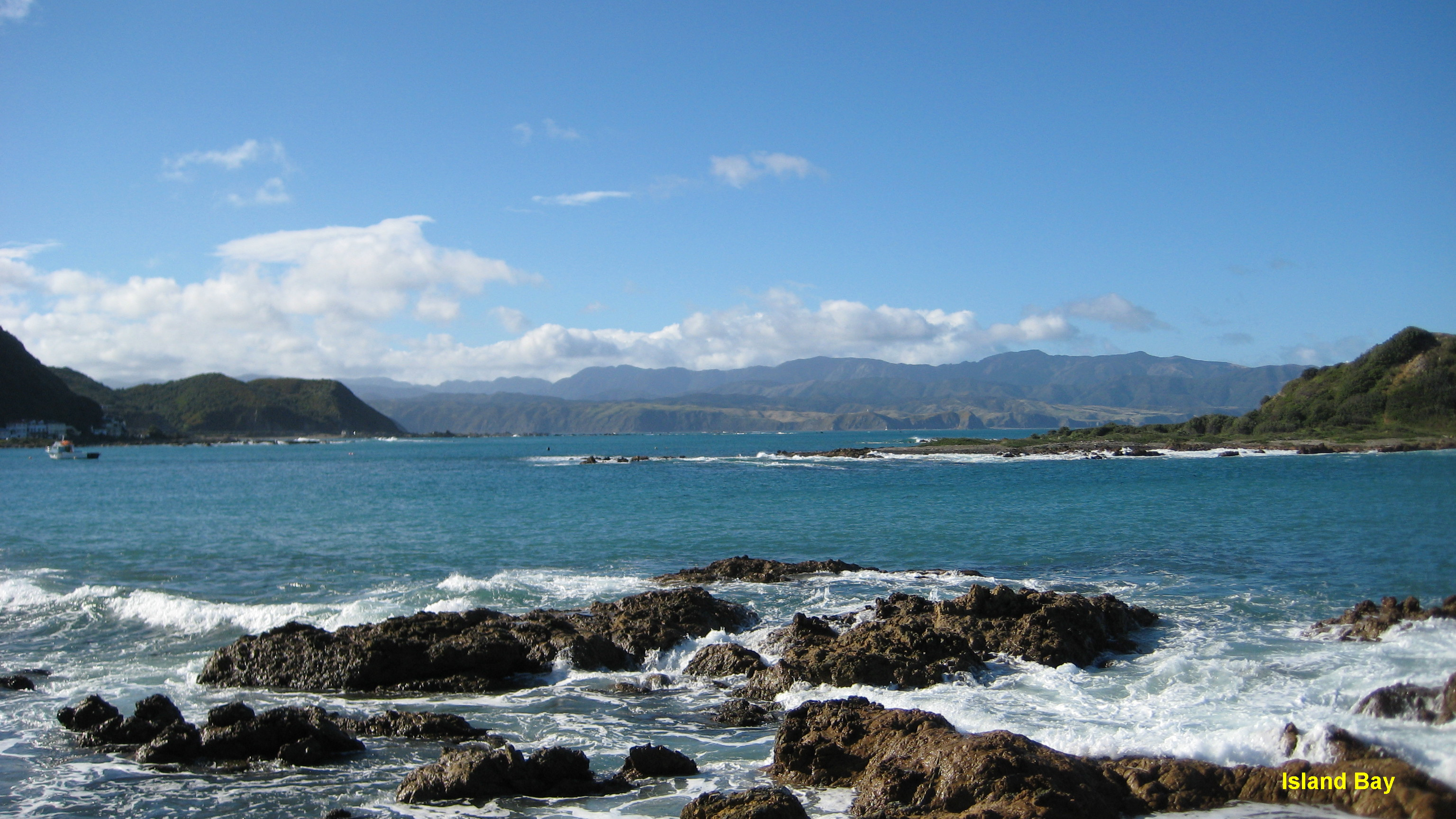
Type locality, Island Bay.

This species is dark brown in colour and has multiple upright fanlike fronds that are semi circular in shape. The branches grow straight and flat and the tips of each branch are fanlike, broad and golden in colour. Z. aureomarginata attach themselves to surfaces via a holdfast that can be as large as 2 cm in width. Z. aureomarginata grows up to 30 cm in length. It is regarded as having a firm texture.

Z. aureomarginata can be distinguished from other Zonaria species by its habitat of shallow water, and the broad and golden tips of the fronds. Under a microscope Z. aureomarginata can be distinguished from its sister species Z. turneriana as the cells in the pith region have an irregular size and form irregular rows and the blades of the algae vary in cell layers from 12 to 14 reducing to 8 cell layers at the edge of the branch.

== Distribution ==
This species is endemic to New Zealand. This species has been found near the Manawatāwhi / Three Kings Islands, the North Island and the northern parts of the South Island as well as at the Chatham Islands.

== Habitat ==
Z. aureomarginata inhabits rugged reefs as well as exposed coastal tidal pools. It can be found from the intertidal zone to upper subtital zone at depths of between 1 and 5m.

== Conservation status ==
As at 2019 this species has been classified by the New Zealand Department of Conservation as "Not Threatened" under the New Zealand Threat Classification System.
