= 1-Naphthol =

Skeletal formula
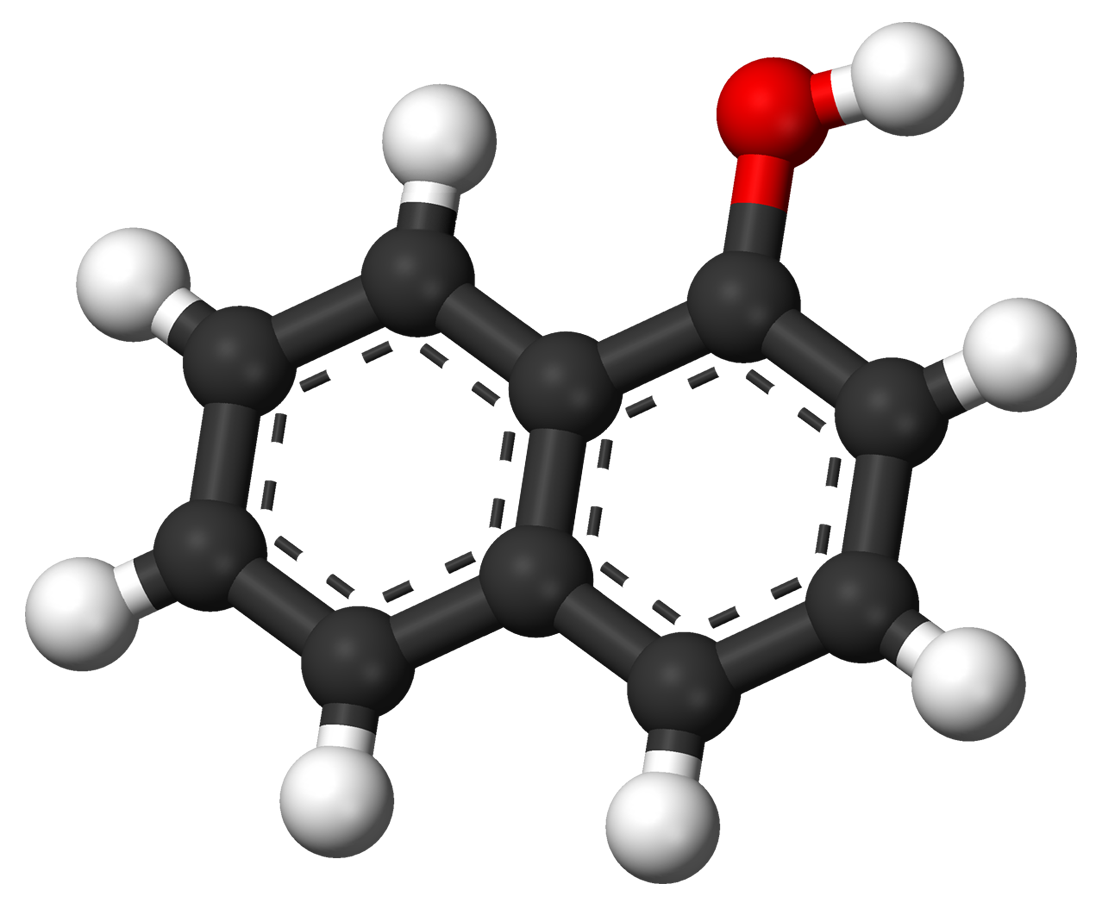

Names
- Preferred IUPAC name Naphthalen-1-ol
- Other names 1-Hydroxynaphthalene; 1-Naphthalenol; α-Naphthol

Identifiers
CAS Number	90-15-3
3D model (JSmol)	Interactive image
Beilstein Reference	1817321
ChEBI	CHEBI:10319
ChEMBL	ChEMBL122617
ChemSpider	6739
ECHA InfoCard	100.001.791
EC Number	201-969-4
Gmelin Reference	69192
KEGG	C11714
PubChem CID	7005
UNII	2A71EAQ389
CompTox Dashboard (EPA)	DTXSID6021793
- InChI: InChI=1S/C10H8O/c11-10-7-3-5-8-4-1-2-6-9(8)10/h1-7,11H Key: KJCVRFUGPWSIIH-UHFFFAOYSA-N; InChI=1/C10H8O/c11-10-7-3-5-8-4-1-2-6-9(8)10/h1-7,11H Key: KJCVRFUGPWSIIH-UHFFFAOYAZ
- SMILES: Oc2cccc1ccccc12

Properties
Chemical formula	C_{10}H_{8}O
Molar mass	144.173 g·mol^{−1}
Appearance	Colorless or white solid
Density	1.10 g/cm^{3}
Melting point	95 to 96 °C (203 to 205 °F; 368 to 369 K)
Boiling point	278 to 280 °C (532 to 536 °F; 551 to 553 K)
Magnetic susceptibility (χ)	−98.2·10^{−6} cm^{3}/mol

Hazards
- GHS labelling
Pictograms	(GHS05: Corrosive) (GHS06: Toxic) (GHS07: Exclamation mark) (GHS09: Environmental hazard)
Signal word	Danger
Hazard statements	H302, H311, H312, H315, H317, H318, H335, H410, H412
Precautionary statements	P261, P262, P264, P264+P265, P270, P271, P272, P273, P280, P301+P317, P302+P352, P304+P340, P305+P354+P338, P316, P317, P319, P321, P330, P333+P317, P361+P364, P362+P364, P391, P403+P233, P405, P501

Related compounds
Related compounds	2-Naphthol
- Except where otherwise noted, data are given for materials in their standard state (at 25 °C [77 °F], 100 kPa). verify (what is ?) Infobox references

1-Naphthol, or α-naphthol, is an organic compound with the formula C_{10}H_{7}OH. It is a fluorescent white solid. 1-Naphthol differs from its isomer 2-naphthol by the location of the hydroxyl group on the naphthalene ring. The naphthols are naphthalene homologues of phenol. Both isomers are soluble in simple organic solvents. They are precursors to a variety of useful compounds.

== Production ==
1-Naphthol is prepared by two main routes. In one method, naphthalene is nitrated to give 1-nitronaphthalene, which is hydrogenated to the amine followed by hydrolysis:

C_{10}H_{8} + HNO_{3} → C_{10}H_{7}NO_{2} + H_{2}O
C_{10}H_{7}NO_{2} + 3H_{2} → C_{10}H_{7}NH_{2} + 2H_{2}O
C_{10}H_{7}NH_{2} + H_{2}O → C_{10}H_{7}OH + NH_{3}

Alternatively, naphthalene is hydrogenated to tetralin, which is oxidized to 1-tetralone, which undergoes dehydrogenation.

== Reactions ==
Some reactions of 1-naphthol are explicable with reference to its tautomerism, which produces a small amount of the keto tautomer.

One consequence of this tautomerism is the Bucherer reaction: the ammonolysis of 1-naphthol to give 1-aminonaphthalene. Low temperature sulfonation of 1-naphthol gives 1-hydroxynaphthalene-2-sulfonic acid.

1-Naphthol biodegrades via formation of 1-naphthol-3,4-oxide, which converts to 1,4-naphthoquinone.

The 4-position of 1-naphthol is susceptible to electrophilic attack. This regioselective reaction is exploited in the preparation of diazo dyes, which are form using diazonium salts. Reduction of the diazo derivatives gives 4-amino-1-naphthol.

Partial reduction of 1-naphthol gives the tetrahydro derivative, leaving intact the phenol ring. Full hydrogenation is catalyzed by rhodium.

== Applications and occurrence ==
1-Naphthol is a precursor to a variety of insecticides including carbaryl and pharmaceuticals including nadolol as well as for the antidepressant sertraline and the anti-protozoan therapeutic atovaquone. It undergoes azo coupling to give various azo dyes, but these are generally less useful than those derived from 2-naphthol.

1-Naphthol is a metabolite of the insecticide carbaryl and naphthalene. Along with TCPy, it has been shown to decrease testosterone levels in adult men.

=== Other uses ===
1-Naphthol is used in each of the following chemical tests, which predate the use of spectroscopic and chromatographic methods:

- Molisch's test gives a red- or purple-colored compound to indicate the presence of carbohydrate.
- rapid furfural test turns purple quickly (<30s) if fructose is present, distinguishing it from glucose.
- Sakaguchi test turns red to indicate the presence of arginine in proteins.
- Voges–Proskauer test changes color from yellow to red to indicate that glucose is being broken down into acetoin which is used by bacteria for external energy storage.

1-Naphthol exhibits some non-peptizing properties, making it ideal as:

- An oxidation inhibitor for industrial soaps, especially as a specified antioxidant in napalm and others fuel thickeners.
- An catalyst in the saponification of fatty esters.

== Safety ==
1-Naphthol has been described as "moderately toxic".
