= Salicylate testing =

Type of drug testing

Salicylate testing is a category of drug testing that is focused on detecting salicylates such as acetysalicylic acid for either biochemical or medical purposes.

== Analytical ==
Salicylates can be identified by GC/MS, proton NMR, and IR.

== In vitro ==
One of the first in vitro tests for aspirin was through the Trinder reaction. Aqueous ferric chloride was added to a urine sample, and the formation of the iron complex turned the solution purple. This test was not specific to acetylsalicylic acid but would occur in the presence of any phenol or enol. The downfall of this test occurs in the presence of hyperbilirubinemia or elevated bilirubin. When the level of bilirubin exceeds 1 mg/dl, a false positive could occur.

== Enzyme Specific Assay ==
The current in vitro testing utilizes molecule specific methods of detecting salicylates.

== Immunoassay ==
Another identification mechanism is through immunoassay. Abbott Laboratories AxSYM is an immunoassay device utilizing Fluorescence Polarization Immunoassay (FPIA) technology that can determine the presence and quantify salicylates. The introduction of a salicylate specific antigen labeled with fluorescein into the sample will mark the sample. Upon irradiation with 490nm light, some of that light will be reflected back to a detector at 520nm. Polarization allows the machine to detect the difference between antibody bound, and unbound fluorescein. It is therefore possible to quantify the serum salicylate level through the signal strength—the amount of reflected light received.

== See also ==
- Psychemedics Corporation
