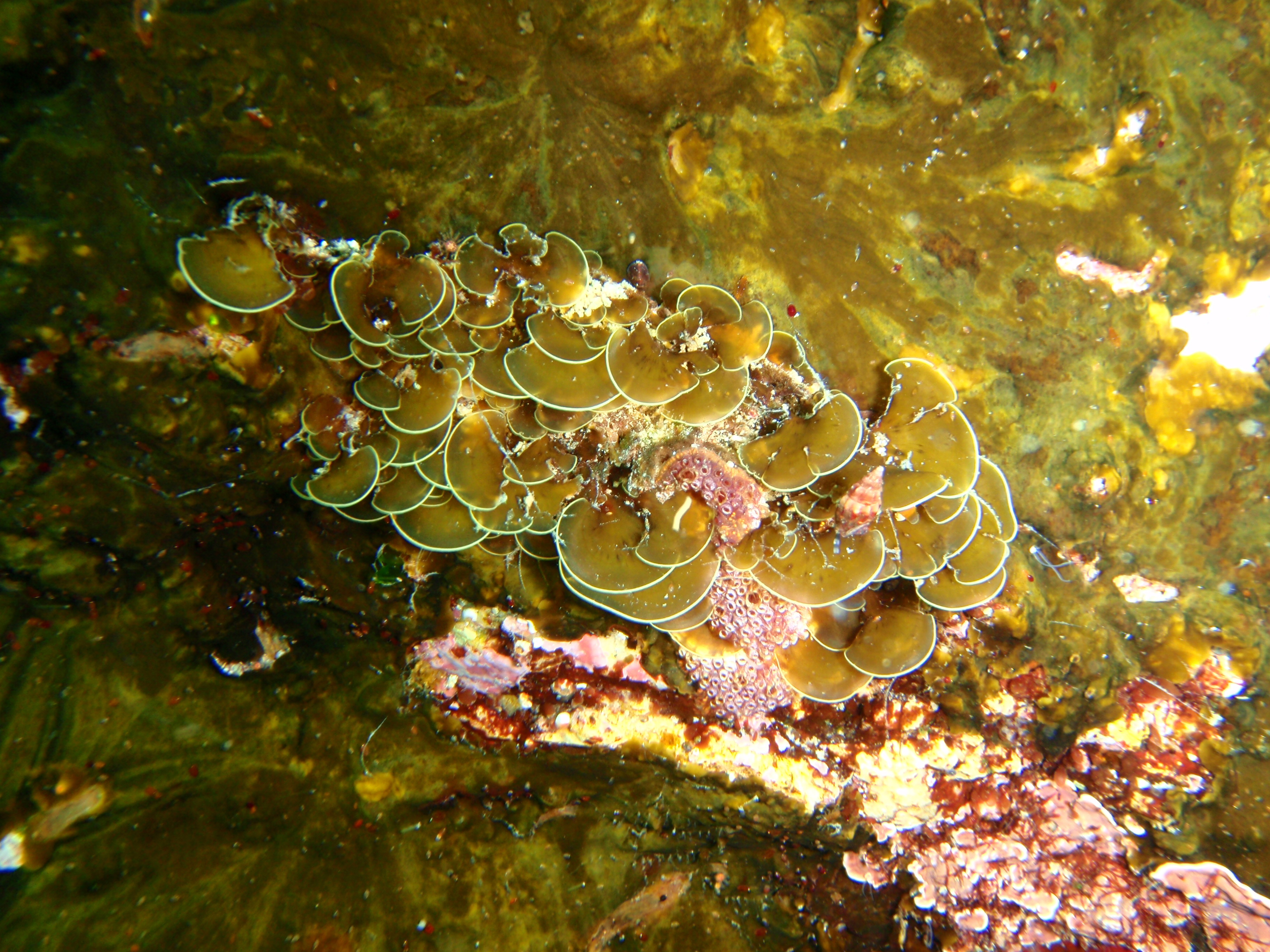

Scientific classification
- Domain: Eukaryota
- Clade: Sar
- Clade: Stramenopiles
- Division: Ochrophyta
- Class: Phaeophyceae
- Order: Dictyotales
- Family: Dictyotaceae
- Genus: Zonaria; C. Agardh, 1817

= Zonaria (alga) =

Genus of algae

Zonaria is a genus of brown alga.The thallus is often between 5 and 27 centimeters tall and only 6-12 cell layers thick.

Members of the genus are known to have anti-fungal properties.

The three Zonaria Australian species Z. turneriana, Z. crenata and Z. angustata produce phloroglucinol derivatives.

== Distribution ==
Zonaria are mostly found in Australasia, but can also be found all over the world, including South Africa, Madagascar, Tunisia, Japan, Taiwan, South Korea, the Atlantic Ocean, and the Mediterranean Sea.

== Taxonomy ==
The genus was established in 1817 by Carl Adolph Agardh. In 1894, members of Zonaria were redistributed to the new genus Homoestrichus. Z. turneriana was lectotypified in 1998.

== Species ==
- Zonaria angustata
- Zonaria aureomarginata
- Zonaria canaliculata
- Zonaria ciliata
- Zonaria coriacea
- Zonaria crenata
- Zonaria crustacea
- Zonaria cryptica
- Zonaria diesingiana
- Zonaria farlowii
- Zonaria flabellata
- Zonaria membranacea
- Zonaria rugosa
- Zonaria spiralis
- Zonaria subarticulata
- Zonaria tournefortii
- Zonaria turneriana
- Zonaria zonata
