= 2-Tetralone =

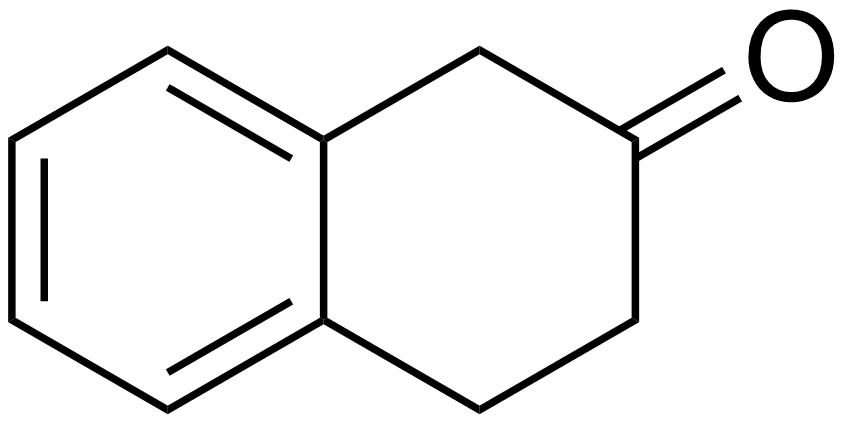

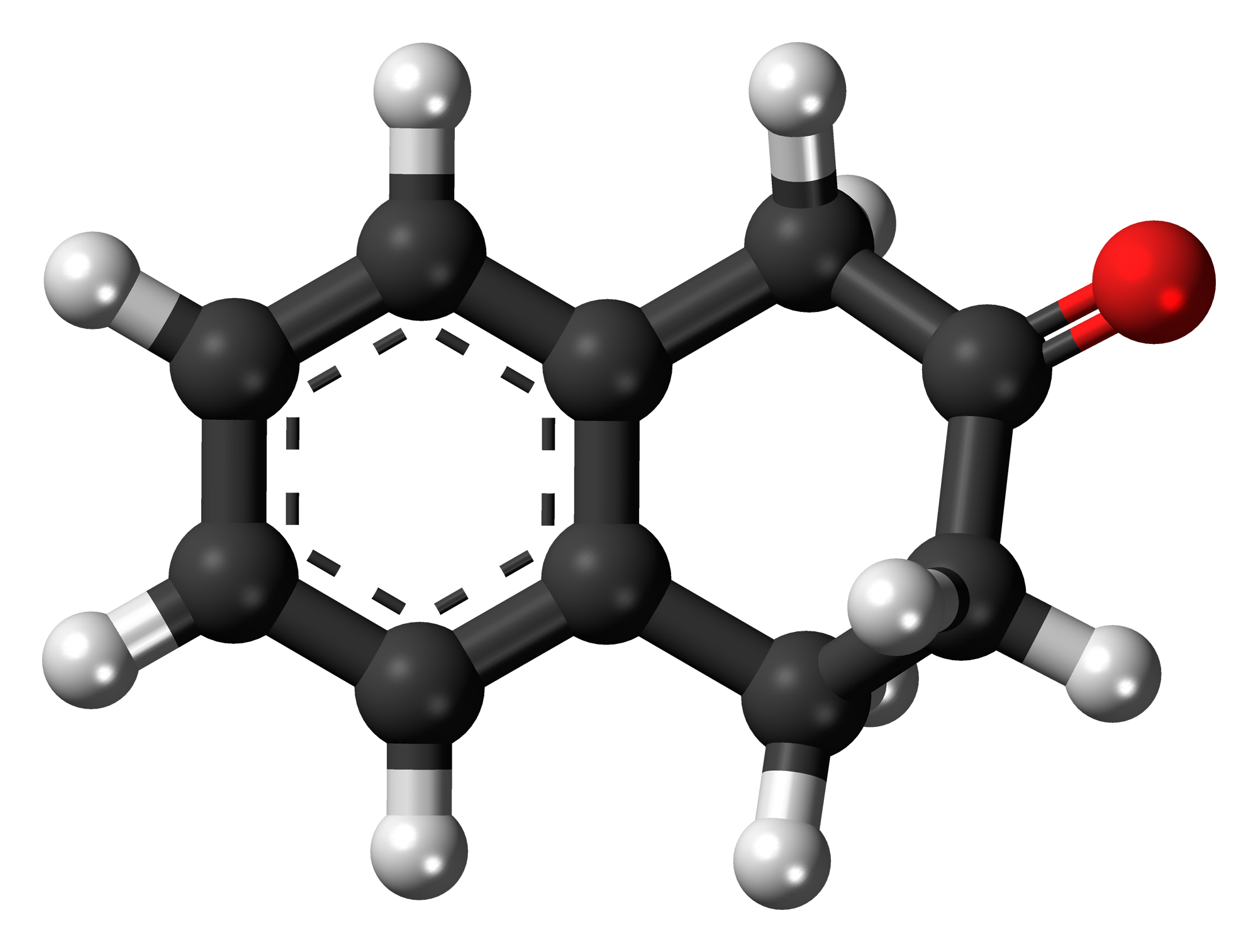

Names
- Preferred IUPAC name 3,4-Dihydronaphthalen-2(1H)-one
- Other names β-Tetralone; 2-Tetralone

Identifiers
CAS Number	530-93-8
3D model (JSmol)	Interactive image
ChemSpider	61564
ECHA InfoCard	100.007.727
EC Number	208-498-3
PubChem CID	68266
UNII	K46ZZ833BH
CompTox Dashboard (EPA)	DTXSID0060193
- InChI: InChI=1S/C10H10O/c11-10-6-5-8-3-1-2-4-9(8)7-10/h1-4H,5-7H2 Key: KCKZIWSINLBROE-UHFFFAOYSA-N; InChI=1/C10H10O/c11-10-6-5-8-3-1-2-4-9(8)7-10/h1-4H,5-7H2 Key: KCKZIWSINLBROE-UHFFFAOYAE
- SMILES: c1ccc2c(c1)CCC(=O)C2

Properties
Chemical formula	C_{10}H_{10}O
Molar mass	146.189 g·mol^{−1}
Appearance	Colourless liquid
Density	1.106 g/mL
Melting point	18 °C (64 °F; 291 K)
Boiling point	70–71 °C (158–160 °F; 343–344 K) /0.25 mm
Solubility in water	in basic water
- Except where otherwise noted, data are given for materials in their standard state (at 25 °C [77 °F], 100 kPa). Infobox references

2-Tetralone is an organic chemical compound with the molecular formula C_{10}H_{10}O. This colourless oil is an intermediate in organic synthesis. It is a ketone derivative of tetralin, a hydrogenated derivative of naphthalene.

== History and synthesis ==
The compound was first obtained by Eugen Bamberger and Wilhelm Lodter in 1893 by dehydrohalogenation of 3-chloro-2-tetralol with hot alkali.

2-Tetralone may be prepared by reductive cleavage of 2-naphthyl ethers.

== Applications ==
2-Tetralone is an intermediate in the synthesis of a variety of pharmaceutical drugs including L-687,384, nepinalone, napamezole, spirodone, and trioxifene.

== See also ==
- 1-Tetralone
