= Carbaryl =

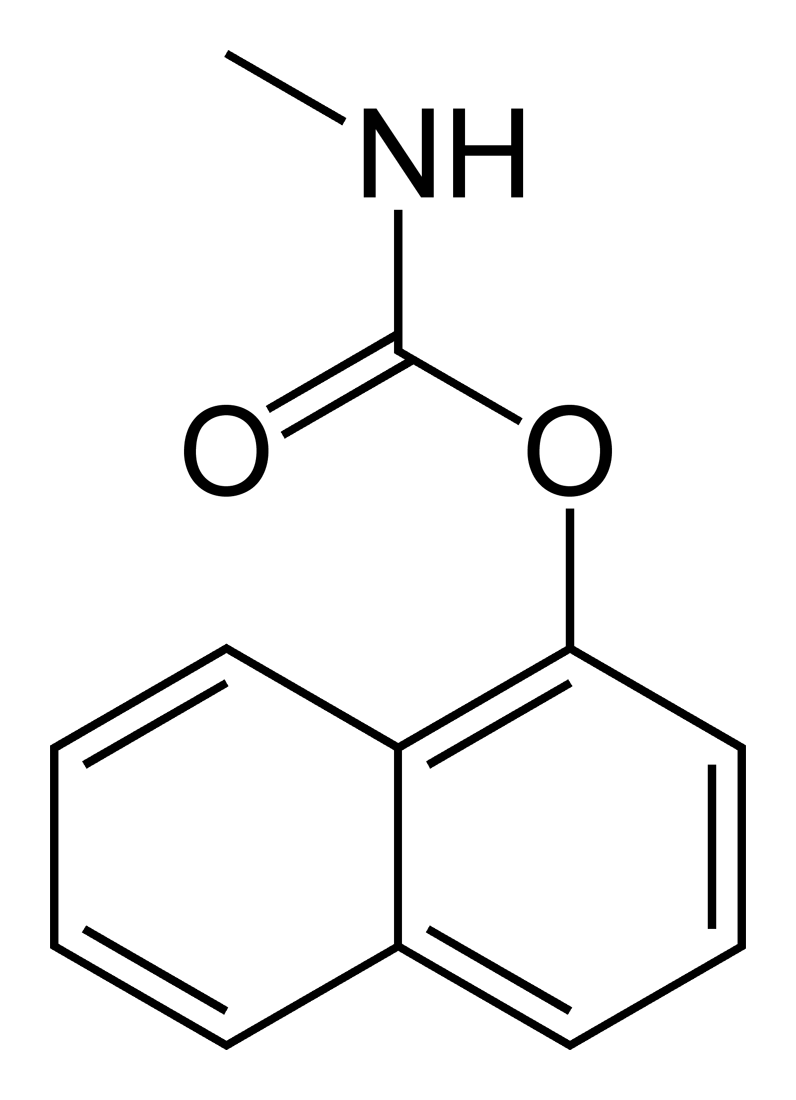

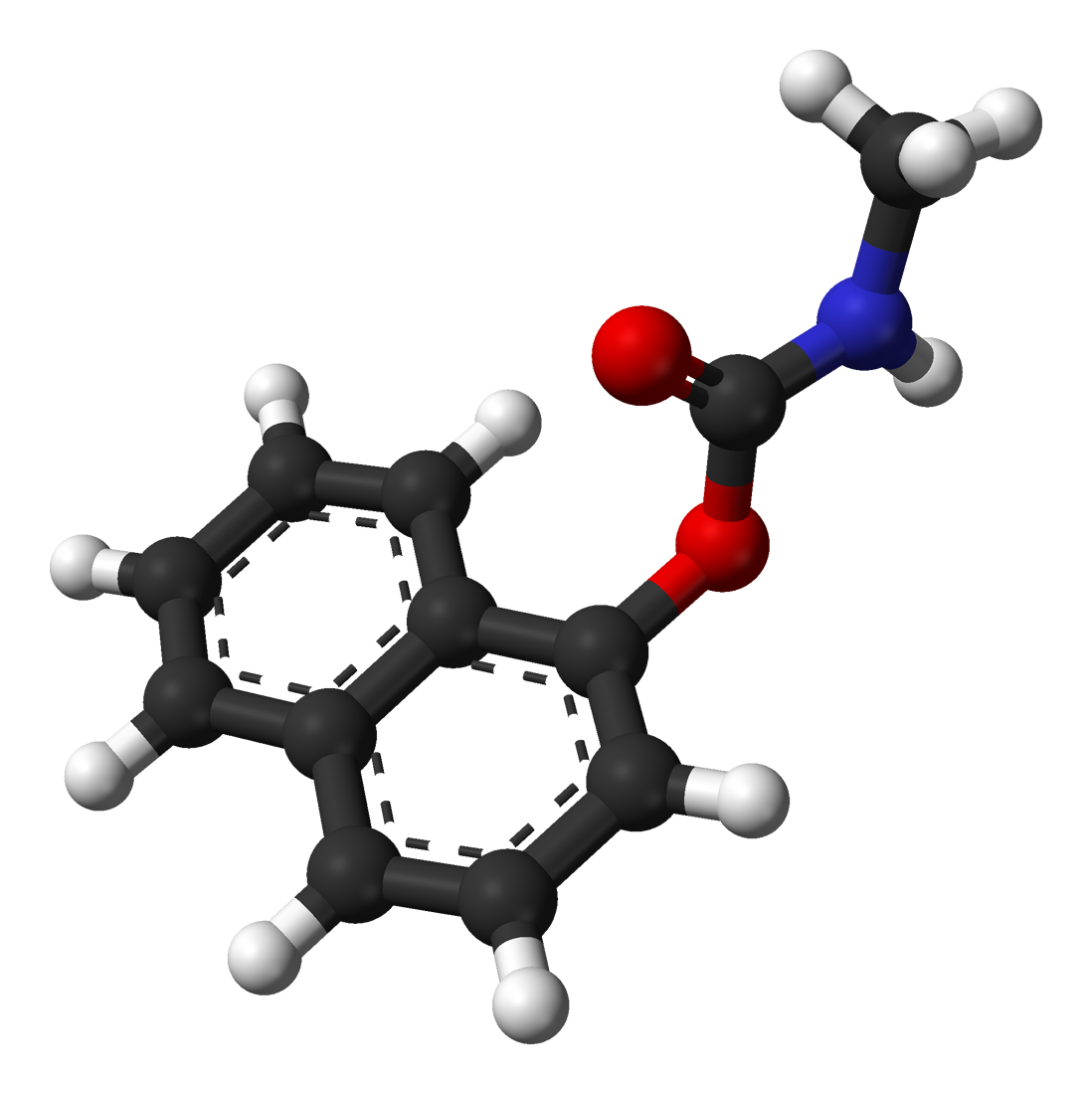

Names
- Preferred IUPAC name Naphthalen-1-yl methylcarbamate
- Other names Sevin (Generic trademark) α-Naphthyl N-methylcarbamate; 1-Naphthyl methylcarbamate

Identifiers
CAS Number	63-25-2
3D model (JSmol)	Interactive image
ChEBI	CHEBI:3390
ChEMBL	ChEMBL46917
ChemSpider	5899
ECHA InfoCard	100.000.505
EC Number	200-555-0
KEGG	D07613
PubChem CID	6129
RTECS number	FC5950000
UNII	R890C8J3N1
UN number	2757
CompTox Dashboard (EPA)	DTXSID9020247
- InChI: InChI=1S/C12H11NO2/c1-13-12(14)15-11-8-4-6-9-5-2-3-7-10(9)11/h2-8H,1H3,(H,13,14) Key: CVXBEEMKQHEXEN-UHFFFAOYSA-N; InChI=1/C12H11NO2/c1-13-12(14)15-11-8-4-6-9-5-2-3-7-10(9)11/h2-8H,1H3,(H,13,14) Key: CVXBEEMKQHEXEN-UHFFFAOYAZ
- SMILES: CNC(=O)Oc1c2ccccc2ccc1

Properties
Chemical formula	C_{12}H_{11}NO_{2}
Molar mass	201.225 g·mol^{−1}
Appearance	Colorless crystalline solid
Density	1.2 g/cm^{3}
Melting point	142 °C (288 °F; 415 K)
Boiling point	decomposes
Solubility in water	very low (0.01% at 20°C)

Pharmacology
ATCvet code	QP53AE01 (WHO)

Hazards
- GHS labelling
Pictograms	(GHS06: Toxic) (GHS07: Exclamation mark) (GHS08: Health hazard) (GHS09: Environmental hazard)
Signal word	Danger
Hazard statements	H301, H302, H332, H351, H410
Precautionary statements	P201, P202, P261, P264, P270, P271, P273, P281, P301+P310, P301+P312, P304+P312, P304+P340, P308+P313, P312, P321, P330, P391, P405, P501
Flash point	193-202
- Lethal dose or concentration (LD, LC)
LD_{50} (median dose)	710 mg/kg (rabbit, oral); 250 mg/kg (guinea pig, oral); 850 mg/kg (rat, oral); 759 mg/kg (dog, oral); 500 mg/kg (rat, oral); 150 mg/kg (cat, oral); 128 mg/kg (mouse, oral); 230 mg/kg (rat, oral)
- NIOSH (US health exposure limits)
PEL (Permissible)	TWA 5 mg/m^{3}
REL (Recommended)	TWA 5 mg/m^{3}
IDLH (Immediate danger)	100 mg/m^{3}
Safety data sheet (SDS)	ICSC 0121
- Except where otherwise noted, data are given for materials in their standard state (at 25 °C [77 °F], 100 kPa). verify (what is ?) Infobox references

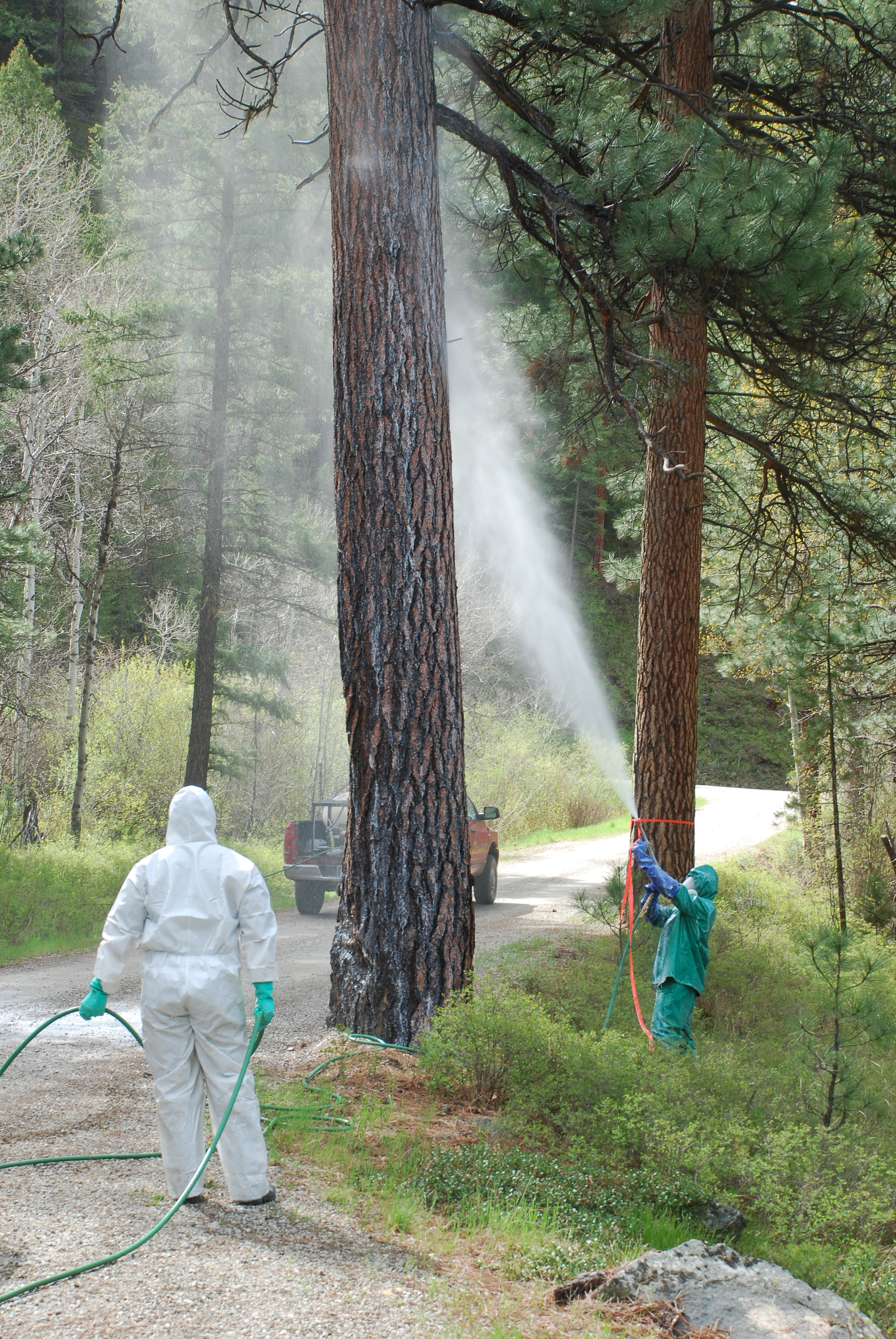
Spraying carbaryl on pine trees

Carbaryl (1-naphthyl methylcarbamate) is an organic compound with the formula C_{10}H_{7}OC(O)NHCH_{3}. Classified as a carbamate, it is used chiefly as an insecticide. It is a white solid, and was sold under the brand name Sevin, which was a trademark of the Bayer Company.

== Production ==
Carbaryl is often inexpensively produced by direct reaction of methyl isocyanate with 1-naphthol.

C_{10}H_{7}OH + CH_{3}NCO → C_{10}H_{7}OC(O)NHCH_{3}

Alternatively, 1-naphthol can be treated with excess phosgene to produce 1-naphthylchloroformate, which is then converted to carbaryl by reaction with methylamine. The former process was used in the chemical plant that caused the Bhopal disaster. In comparison, the latter synthesis uses exactly the same reagents required for the synthesis of methyl isocyanate. This route avoids the potential hazards of methyl isocyanate, allbeit at a higher cost.

== Biochemistry ==
Carbamate insecticides are reversible inhibitors of the enzyme acetylcholinesterase and are considered less toxic than organophosphate insecticides, which inhibit the enzyme irreversibly. They resemble acetylcholine, but the carbamoylated enzyme undergoes the final hydrolysis step very slowly (minutes) compared with the acetylated enzyme generated by acetylcholine (microseconds). They interfere with the cholinergic nervous system and cause death because the effects of the neurotransmitter acetylcholine cannot be terminated by carbamoylated acetylcholinesterase.

== Applications ==
Union Carbide discovered carbaryl and commercialized it in 1958. Bayer purchased Aventis CropScience in 2002, a company that included Union Carbide pesticide operations. Carbaryl was once the third-most-used insecticide in the United States for home gardens, commercial agriculture, and forestry and rangeland protection. As a veterinary drug, it is known as carbaril (INN).

The commercial introduction of the carbamate insecticides in 1959 was hailed as a major breakthrough in pesticides. The carbamates do not have the persistence of chlorinated pesticides. Although toxic to insects, carbaryl is detoxified and eliminated rapidly in vertebrates. It is neither concentrated in fat nor secreted in milk, so is favored for food crops, at least in the US. During the period 1992-2001, when it was in peak use, 3.9M pounds were sold. Since 2007 its use has been banned in the UK and in Europe, while it remains permitted in US, Canada, and Australia. Even where allowed, its use has been curtailed.

== Ecology ==
Carbaryl kills both targeted (e.g., malaria-carrying mosquitos) and beneficial insects (e.g., honeybees), as well as crustaceans. Because it is highly toxic to zooplankton, the algae they feed on experience blooms. Boone & Bridges 2003 find that larger algae eaters such as Bufo woodhousii benefit from this effect.

Although it can increase survival rates for organisms that benefit from consequential algae blooms, the long term effects of these changes in competition levels and predation can be detrimental to many aquatic ecosystems, particularly those dominated by Anurans.

It is approved for more than 100 crops in the US. Carbaryl has been illegal in the EU since 21 November 2007 and Angola.

== Safety ==
Carbaryl is a cholinesterase inhibitor and is toxic to humans. It is classified as a likely human carcinogen by the United States Environmental Protection Agency (EPA.) The oral LD_{50} is 250 to 850 mg/kg for rats and 100 to 650 mg/kg for mice.

Carbaryl can be produced using methyl isocyanate (MIC) as an intermediary. A leak of MIC used in the production of carbaryl caused the Bhopal disaster, the most lethal industrial accident in history.
