= Phloroglucinol reductase =

Class of enzymes

phloroglucinol reductase

Identifiers
- EC no.: 1.3.1.57

Databases
- IntEnz: IntEnz view
- BRENDA: BRENDA entry
- ExPASy: NiceZyme view
- KEGG: KEGG entry
- MetaCyc: metabolic pathway
- PRIAM: profile
- PDB structures: RCSB PDB PDBe PDBsum
- Gene Ontology: AmiGO / QuickGO
Search
- PMC: articles
- PubMed: articles
- NCBI: proteins

In enzymology, phloroglucinol reductase (EC 1.3.1.57) is an enzyme that catalyzes the chemical reaction

(1)
+ NADP^{+}
H^{+}
H^{+}
(2)
+ NADPH

The two substrates of this enzyme are dihydrophloroglucinol (1) and oxidised nicotinamide adenine dinucleotide phosphate (NADP^{+}). Its products are phloroglucinol (2), reduced NADPH, and a proton.

This enzyme belongs to the family of oxidoreductases, specifically those acting on the CH-CH group of donor with NAD+ or NADP+ as acceptor. The systematic name of this enzyme class is dihydrophloroglucinol:NADP+ oxidoreductase. This enzyme participates in benzoate degradation via CoA ligation.
