= Flavaspidic acid =

Flavaspidic acid AB is a polyphenol that is a phloroglucinol derivative isolated from the rhizomes of Dryopteris Crassirhizoma and has been shown to exhibit radical scavenging and antibacterial activity. It has a role as a metabolite and an antibacterial agent. Flavaspidic acid may refer to:

- Flavaspidic acid BB
- Flavaspidic acid AB
- Flavaspidic acid PB
