= 1-Tetralone =

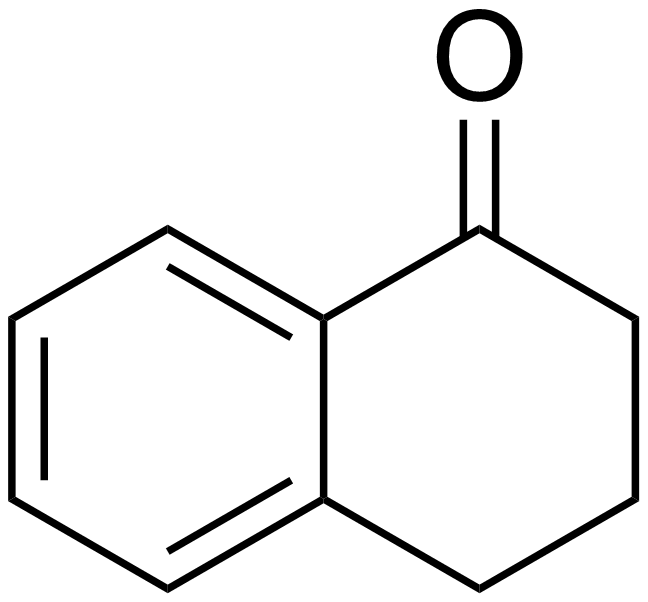

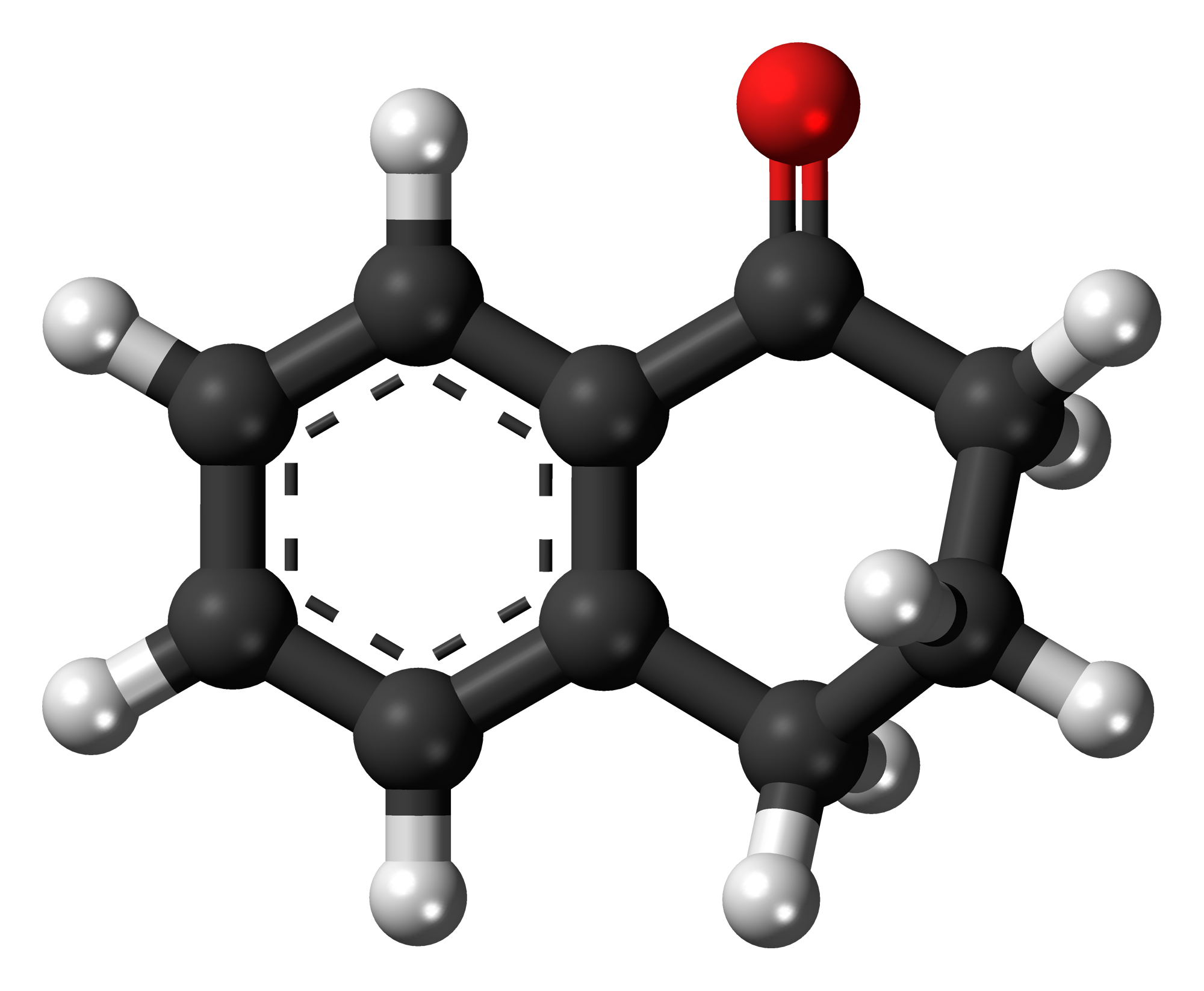

Names
- Preferred IUPAC name 3,4-Dihydronaphthalen-1(2H)-one
- Other names α-Tetralone; 1-Tetralone

Identifiers
| CAS Number | 529-34-0 |
| 3D model (JSmol) | Interactive image |
| ChEMBL | ChEMBL193373 |
| ChemSpider | 10273 |
| ECHA InfoCard | 100.007.692 |
| EC Number | 208-460-6 |
| PubChem CID | 10724 |
| UNII | 6VT52A15HY |
| CompTox Dashboard (EPA) | DTXSID2027175 |
- InChI: InChI=1S/C10H10O/c11-10-7-3-5-8-4-1-2-6-9(8)10/h1-2,4,6H,3,5,7H2 Key: XHLHPRDBBAGVEG-UHFFFAOYSA-N; InChI=1/C10H10O/c11-10-7-3-5-8-4-1-2-6-9(8)10/h1-2,4,6H,3,5,7H2 Key: XHLHPRDBBAGVEG-UHFFFAOYAD
- SMILES: C1CC2=CC=CC=C2C(=O)C1

Properties
| Chemical formula | C_{10}H_{10}O |
| Molar mass | 146.189 g·mol^{−1} |
| Appearance | colorless liquid |
| Density | 1.099 g·cm^{−3} (25 °C) |
| Melting point | 2–7 °C |
| Boiling point | 255–257 °C; 113–116 °C (8 hPa) |
| Solubility in water | insoluble |
| Solubility | soluble in organic solvents |
| Vapor pressure | 2.7 Pa (20 °C) |
| Refractive index (n_{D}) | 1.5672 |

Hazards
- GHS labelling
| Pictograms | (GHS07: Exclamation mark) |
| Signal word | Warning |
| Hazard statements | H302 |
| Precautionary statements | P264, P270, P301+P317, P330, P501 |
- Except where otherwise noted, data are given for materials in their standard state (at 25 °C [77 °F], 100 kPa). verify (what is ?) Infobox references

1-Tetralone is a bicyclic aromatic hydrocarbon and a ketone. In terms of its structure, it can also be regarded as benzo-fused cyclohexanone. It is a colorless oil with a faint odor. It is used as starting material for agricultural and pharmaceutical agents. The carbon skeleton of 1-tetralone is found in natural products such as Aristelegone A (4,7-dimethyl-6-methoxy-1-tetralone) from the family of Aristolochiaceae used in traditional Chinese medicine.

== Preparation ==
=== By oxidation of 1,2,3,4-tetrahydronaphthalene ===
As already described in 1933 by Heinrich Hock, 1,2,3,4-tetrahydronaphthalene tends to autoxidize and gradually forms the 1-hydroperoxide with atmospheric oxygen. The heavy metal ion catalyzed air oxidation of 1,2,3,4-tetrahydronaphthalene with Cr^{3+} or Cu^{2+} in the liquid phase leads via the hydroperoxide to a mixture of the intermediate 1-tetralol and the final product 1-tetralone.

Oxidation von Tetraloin zu 1-Tetralon

The boiling points of the main component 1-tetralone (255-257 °C) and the minor component 1-tetralol (255 °C) are virtually identical, the latter is therefore removed by a chemical reaction.

=== By Friedel-Crafts reactions ===
The starting compound 4-phenylbutanoic acid is accessible from 3-benzoylpropanoic acid via catalytic hydrogenation, using a palladium contact catalyst. 3-Benzoylpropanoic acid itself can be obtained by a Haworth reaction (a variant of the Friedel-Crafts reaction) from benzene and succinic anhydride.

The intramolecular cyclization of 4-phenylbutanoic acid to 1-tetralone is catalyzed by polyphosphoric acid and methanesulfonic acid.

Cyclisierung von 4-Phenylbuttersäure zu 1-Tetralon

It has been described as a teaching experiment for chemistry lessons. 4-Phenylbutanoic acid can also be quantitatively converted into 1-tetralone by heating in the presence of a strong Lewis acid catalyst such as bismuth(III)bis(trifluoromethanesulfonyl)amide [Bi(NTf_{2})_{3}], which is relatively easily accessible.

The use of the acid chloride and tin(IV) chloride (SnCl_{4}) allows significantly shorter reaction times than the Friedel-Crafts acylation with 4-phenylbutanoic acid.

Synthese von 1-Tetralon über 4-Phenylbuttersäurechlorid

4-Phenylbutanoic acid chlorides with electron-donating groups can be cyclized to 1-tetralones under mild reaction conditions in yields greater than 90% using the strong hydrogen-bonding solvent hexafluoroisopropanol (HFIP).

The AlCl_{3}-catalyzed acylation of benzene with γ-butyrolactone produces 1-tetralone.

Synthesis of 1-tetralone using butyrolactone.

== Reactions ==
1-Tetralone can be reduced via a Birch reduction with lithium in liquid ammonia to 1,2,3,4-tetrahydronaphthalene. The keto group can also be reduced to a secondary alcohol giving 1-tetralol, when a modified process is applied, using the addition of aqueous ammonium chloride solution after evaporation of the ammonia.

Reaktionen von 1-Tetralon mit Li in Ammoniak

With calcium in liquid ammonia, 1-tetralone is reduced to 1-tetralol at −33 °C in 81% yield.

The methylene group in α-position to the keto group is particularly reactive and can be converted with formaldehyde (in the form of the trimeric trioxane) to 2-methylene-1-tetralone in the presence of the trifluoroacetic acid salt of N-methylaniline with yields up to 91% .

Synthese von 2-Methylen-1-tetralon aus 1-Tetralon

The 2-methylene ketone is stable at temperatures below −5 °C, but fully polymerizes at room temperature within 12 hours.

In the Pfitzinger reaction of 1-tetralone with isatin, a compound called tetrofan (3,4-dihydro-1,2-benzacridine-5-carboxylic acid) is formed.

Synthese von Tetrophan

The reactivity of the α-methylene group is also exploited in the reaction of 1-tetralone with methanol at 270-290 °C, which produces via dehydrogenation and formation of the aromatic naphthalene ring system 2-methyl-1-naphthol in 66% yield.

Synthese von 2-Methyl-1-naphthol

The oxime of 1-tetralone reacts with acetic anhydride leading to aromatization of the cycloalkanone ring. The resulting N-(1-naphthyl)acetamide has biological properties akin to those of 2-(1-Naphthyl)acetic acid as a synthetic auxin.

Synthese von N-(1-Naphthyl)acetamid

The tertiary alcohol formed in the Grignard reaction of 1-tetralone with phenylmagnesium bromide reacts with acetic anhydride upon elimination of water to 1-phenyl-3,4-dihydronaphthalene, which is dehydrated with elemental sulfur in an overall yield of about 45% to 1-phenylnaphthalene.

Synthese von 1-Phenylnaphthalin aus 1-Tetralon

The ruthenium(II)-catalyzed arylation of 1-tetralone using phenyl boronic acid neopentyl glycol ester gives 8-phenyl-1-tetralone in up to 86% yield.

Synthese von 8-Phenyl-1-tetralon aus 1-Tetralon

With 5-aminotetrazole and an aromatic aldehyde, 1-tetralone reacts in a multi-component reaction under microwave irradiation to form a four-membered heterocyclic ring system.

Multikomponentenreaktion von 1-Tetralon mit Aminotetrazol und aromatischem Aldehyd

== Applications ==
By far the most important application of 1-tetralone is in the synthesis of 1-naphthol by aromatization, e.g. upon contact with platinum catalysts at 200 to 450 °C.

Synthese von 1-Naphthol aus 1-Tetralon

1-Naphthol is the starting material for the insecticides carbaryl and the beta-blockers propranolol.

A known application of 1-tetralone is in the synthesis of RAC-109 [17592-97-1] & RAC-421 [139085-58-8].

== Safety ==
Toxicological studies were dermally performed with rabbits, with an LD50 of 2192 mg·kg^{−1} body weight being observed.
