= Anaerobic organism =

Organism not requiring oxygen for its growth

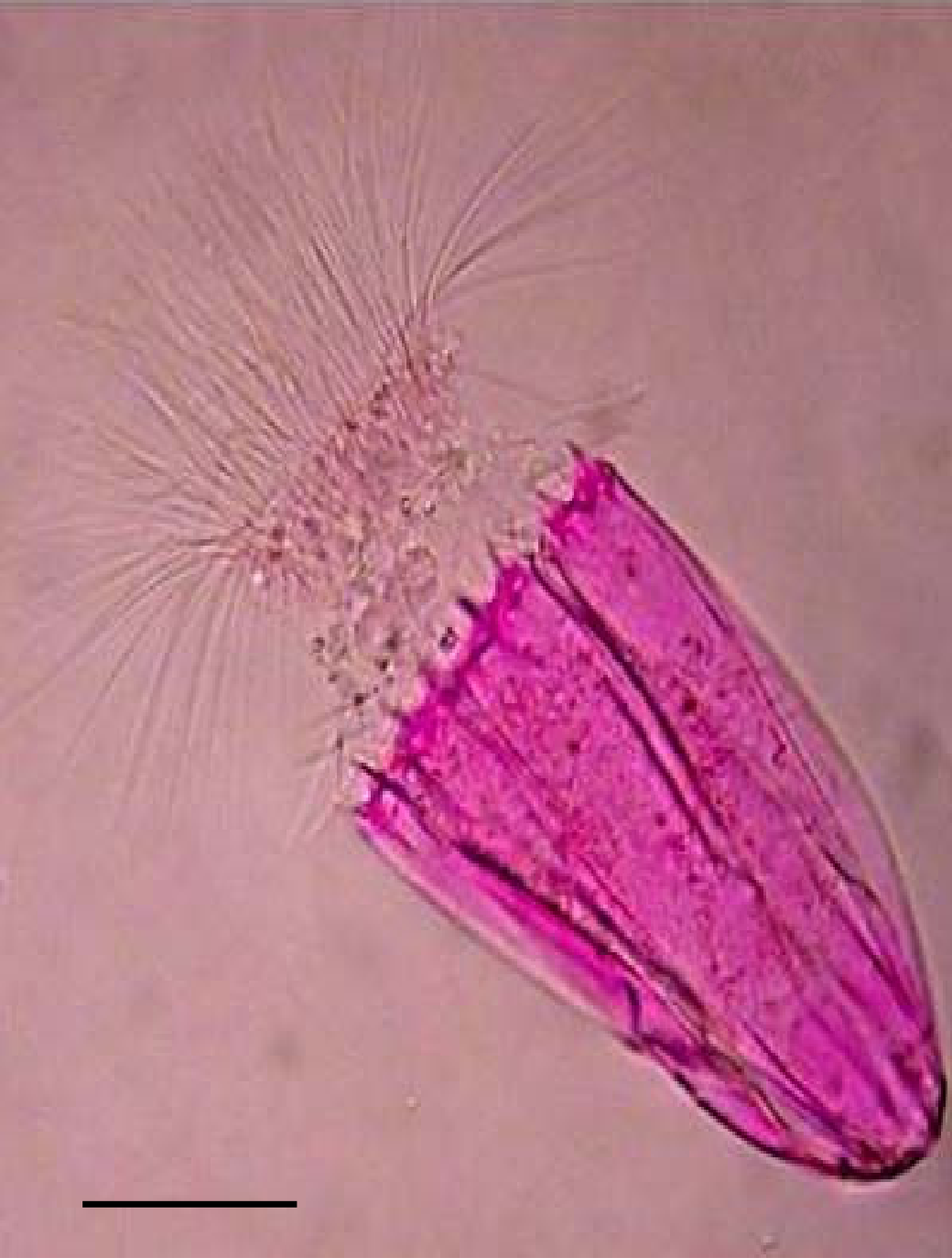
Spinoloricus cinziae, a metazoan that metabolises with hydrogen, lacking mitochondria and instead using hydrogenosomes

An anaerobic organism or anaerobe is an organism that does not require molecular oxygen for growth or energy metabolism. Anaerobes produce adenosine triphosphate (ATP) by fermentation, anaerobic respiration, or both. During anaerobic respiration, substances other than oxygen serve as the terminal electron acceptor.

Anaerobes are commonly classified according to their relationship with oxygen. Obligate anaerobes are harmed by it. Aerotolerant organisms do not use oxygen but can tolerate it, whereas facultative anaerobes can grow without oxygen but use it when available.

Most anaerobes are microorganisms, including bacteria, archaea, protozoa, and fungi, although a small number of anaerobic multicellular animals are known. Anaerobes occur in oxygen-depleted environments and in symbiotic associations with other organisms. Culturing anaerobes often requires oxygen-free techniques.

== First recorded observation ==
In his 14 June 1680 letter to the Royal Society, Antonie van Leeuwenhoek described an experiment he carried out by filling two identical glass tubes about halfway with crushed pepper powder, to which some clean rain water was added. Van Leeuwenhoek sealed one of the glass tubes with a flame and left the other open. Several days later, he discovered in the open glass tube 'a great many very little animalcules, of divers sort having its own particular motion.' Not expecting to see any life in the sealed glass tube, Van Leeuwenhoek saw to his surprise 'a kind of living animalcules that were round and bigger than the biggest sort that I have said were in the other water.' The conditions in the sealed tube had become quite anaerobic due to the consumption of oxygen by aerobic microorganisms.

In 1913, Martinus Beijerinck repeated Van Leeuwenhoek's experiment and identified Clostridium butyricum as a prominent anaerobic bacterium in the sealed pepper infusion tube liquid. Beijerinck commented:

We thus come to the remarkable conclusion that, beyond doubt, Van Leeuwenhoek in his experiment with the fully closed tube had cultivated and seen genuine anaerobic bacteria, which would happen again only after 200 years, namely about 1862 by Pasteur. That Leeuwenhoek, one hundred years before the discovery of oxygen and the composition of air, was not aware of the meaning of his observations is understandable. But the fact that in the closed tube he observed an increased gas pressure caused by fermentative bacteria and, in addition, saw the bacteria, prove, in any case, that he not only was a good observer but also was able to design an experiment from which a conclusion could be drawn.

== Classifications ==
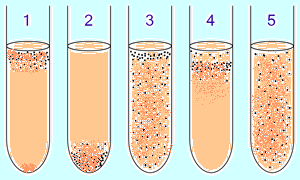
Aerobic and anaerobic bacteria can be differentiated by culturing them in test tubes of thioglycolate broth: 1. Obligate aerobes need oxygen because they cannot ferment or respire anaerobically. They gather at the top of the tube where the oxygen concentration is highest.; 2. Obligate anaerobes are poisoned by oxygen, so they gather at the bottom of the tube where the oxygen concentration is lowest.; 3. Facultative anaerobes can grow with or without oxygen because they can metabolize energy aerobically or anaerobically. They gather mostly at the top because aerobic respiration generates more adenosine triphosphate (ATP) than either fermentation or anaerobic respiration.; 4. Microaerophiles need oxygen because they cannot ferment or respire anaerobically. However, they are poisoned by high concentrations of oxygen. They gather in the upper part of the test tube but not the very top.; 5. Aerotolerant organisms do not require oxygen as they metabolize energy anaerobically. Unlike obligate anaerobes, however, they are not poisoned by oxygen. They are evenly distributed throughout the test tube.

For practical purposes, there are three categories of anaerobe:

- Obligate anaerobes, which are harmed by the presence of oxygen. Two examples of obligate anaerobes are Clostridium botulinum and the bacteria which live near hydrothermal vents on the deep-sea ocean floor.
- Aerotolerant organisms, which cannot use oxygen for growth, but tolerate its presence.
- Facultative anaerobes, which can grow without oxygen but use oxygen if it is present.

However, this classification has been questioned after recent research showed that human "obligate anaerobes" (such as Finegoldia magna or the methanogenic archaea Methanobrevibacter smithii) can be grown in aerobic atmosphere if the culture medium is supplemented with antioxidants such as ascorbic acid, glutathione and uric acid.

== Energy metabolism ==
Some obligate anaerobes use fermentation, while others use anaerobic respiration. Aerotolerant organisms are strictly fermentative. In the presence of oxygen, facultative anaerobes use aerobic respiration. In the absence of oxygen, some facultative anaerobes use fermentation, while others may use anaerobic respiration.

=== Fermentation ===
There are many anaerobic fermentative reactions.

Fermentative anaerobic organisms typically use the lactic acid fermentation pathway:

C_{6}H_{12}O_{6} + 2 ADP + 2 phosphate → 2 lactic acid + 2 ATP + 2 H_{2}O

The energy released in this reaction (without ADP and phosphate) is approximately 150 kJ per mol, which is conserved in generating two ATP from ADP per glucose. This is only 5% of the energy per sugar molecule that the typical aerobic reaction generates.

Plants and fungi (e.g., yeasts) in general use alcohol (ethanol) fermentation when oxygen becomes limiting:

C_{6}H_{12}O_{6} (glucose) + 2 ADP + 2 phosphate → 2 C_{2}H_{5}OH + 2 CO_{2}↑ + 2 ATP + 2 H_{2}O

The energy released is about 180 kJ/mol, which is conserved when 2 ATP are generated from 2 ADP per glucose.

Anaerobic bacteria and archaea use these and many other fermentative pathways, e.g., propionic acid fermentation, butyric acid fermentation, solvent fermentation, mixed acid fermentation, butanediol fermentation, Stickland fermentation, acetogenesis, or methanogenesis.

=== CrP hydrolysis ===
Creatine, an organic compound found in animals, provides a way for ATP to be utilized in the muscle. The phosphorylation of creatine allows for the storage of readily available phosphate that can be supplied to the muscles.

creatine + ATP ⇌ phosphocreatine + ADP + H^{+}

The reaction is reversible as well, allowing cellular ATP levels to be maintained during anoxic conditions. This process in animals is seen to be coupled with metabolic suppression to allow certain fish, such as goldfish, to survive environmental anoxic conditions for a short period.

== Culturing anaerobes ==
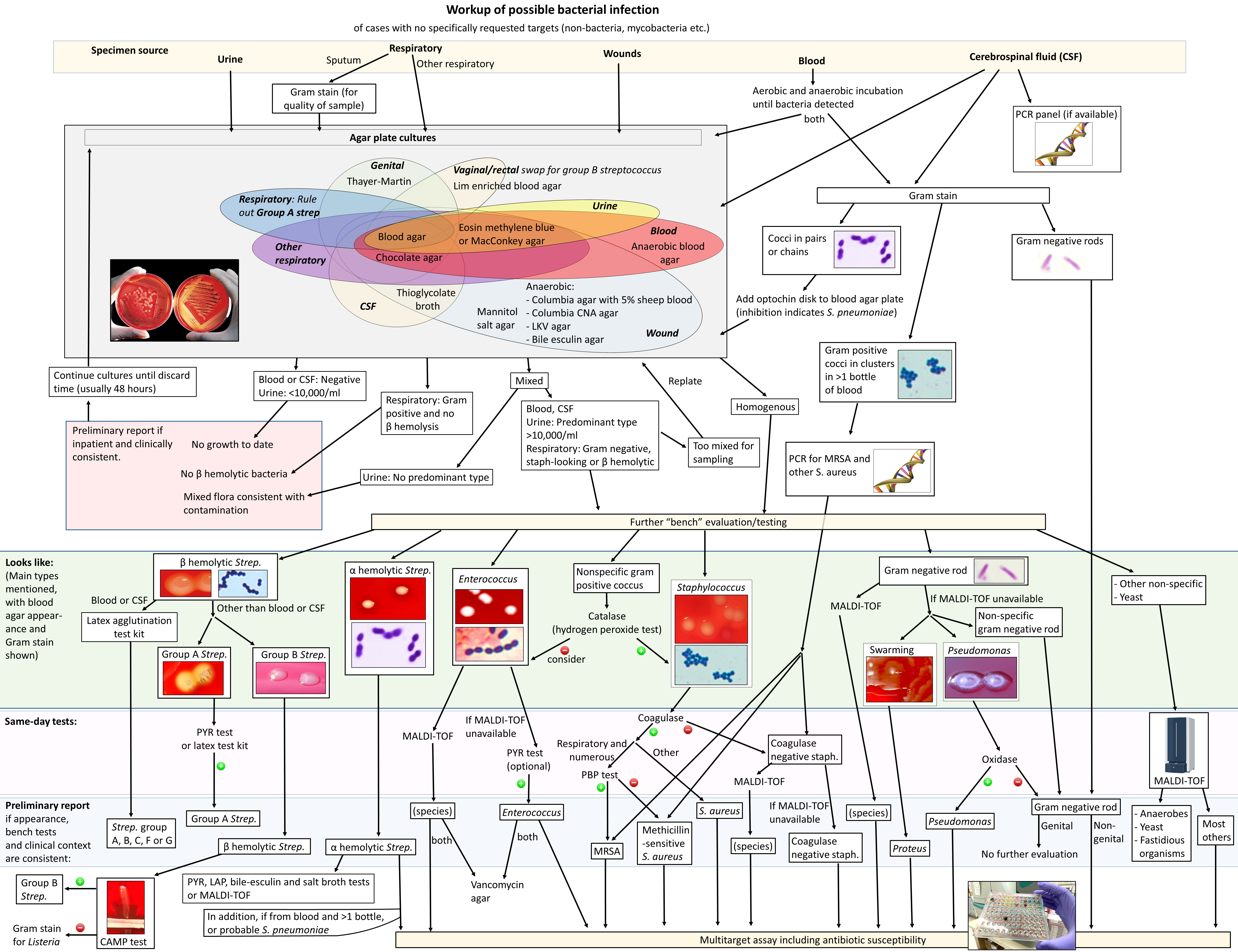
Example of a workup algorithm of possible bacterial infection in cases with no specifically requested targets (non-bacteria, mycobacteria, etc.), with most common situations and agents seen in a New England community hospital setting. Multiple anaerobic growth media are mentioned among agar plate cultures. Anaerobes may also be identified by MALDI-TOF as shown at bottom right.

Since normal microbial culturing is done in atmospheric air, which contains molecular oxygen, culturing anaerobes requires special techniques. Several techniques are employed by microbiologists when culturing anaerobic organisms, for example, handling the bacteria in a glovebox filled with nitrogen or the use of other specially sealed containers, or techniques such as injection of the bacteria into a dicot plant, which is an environment with limited oxygen. The Gas-pak System is an isolated container that achieves an anaerobic environment by the reaction of water with sodium borohydride and sodium bicarbonate tablets, which produce hydrogen gas and carbon dioxide. Hydrogen then reacts with oxygen gas on a palladium catalyst to produce more water, thereby removing oxygen gas. The issue with the Gas-Pak method is that an adverse reaction can occur, leading to bacterial death; therefore, a thioglycolate medium should be used. The thioglycolate supplies a medium mimicking that of a dicot plant, thus providing not only an anaerobic environment but all the nutrients needed for the bacteria to multiply.

On May the 6 2018, a French team evidenced a link between redox and gut anaerobes based on clinical studies of severe acute malnutrition. (Note: This study was later retracted over ethical oversight concerns.) These findings led to the development of an aerobic culture of "anaerobes" by the addition of antioxidants in the culture medium.

== Multicellularity ==
Very few multicellular life forms are anaerobic, since only aerobic respiration can provide enough energy for a complex metabolism. Exceptions include three species of Loricifera (< 1 mm in size) and the 10-cell Henneguya zschokkei.

In 2010, three species of anaerobic Loricifera were discovered in the hypersaline anoxic L'Atalante basin at the bottom of the Mediterranean Sea. They lack mitochondria, which contain the oxidative phosphorylation pathway, which in all other animals combines oxygen with glucose to produce metabolic energy; thus, they consume no oxygen. Instead, these loricifera derive their energy from hydrogen, using hydrogenosomes.

Henneguya zschokkei also lack mitochondria, mitochondrial DNA, and oxidative pathways. The microscopic, parasitic cnidarian is observed to contain mitochondria-related organelles. These organelles harbour genes encoding metabolic functions, such as those involved in the amino acid metabolism. However, these specialized organelles lack the key features of typical mitochondria found in the closely related aerobic Myxobolus squamalus. Due to the difficulty of culturing H. zschokkei, there is little understanding of its anaerobic pathway.

== Symbiosis ==
Anaerobic respiration and its end products can facilitate symbiosis between anaerobes and aerobes. This occurs across taxa, often in compensation for nutritional needs.

Anaerobiosis and symbiosis are found in interactions between ciliates and prokaryotes. Anaerobic ciliates interact with prokaryotes in an endosymbiotic relationship. These relationships are mediated in which the ciliate leaves end products that its prokaryotic symbiont utilizes. The ciliate achieves this through fermentative metabolism. The rumen of various animals houses this ciliate alongside many other anaerobic bacteria, protozoans, and fungi. In specific, methanogenic archaea found in the rumen acts as a symbiont to anaerobic ciliates. These anaerobes are useful to those with a rumen due to their ability to break down cellulose, making it bioavailable when otherwise indigestible by animals.

Termites utilize anaerobic bacteria to fix and recapture nitrogen. Specifically, the termite's hindgut is full of nitrogen-fixing bacteria, whose functions depend on the nitrogen concentration of the diet. Acetylene reduction in termites was observed to upregulate in termites with nitrogen-poor diets, meaning that nitrogenase activity rose as the nitrogen content of the termite was reduced. One of the functions of termite microbiota is to recapture nitrogen from the termite's uric acid. This allows nitrogen conservation from a diet otherwise low in nitrogen. The hindgut microbiome of different termites has been analyzed, showing 16 different anaerobic species of bacteria, including Clostridia, Enterobacteriaceae, and Gram-positive cocci.

== See also ==
- Aerobic organism
- Redox gradient
