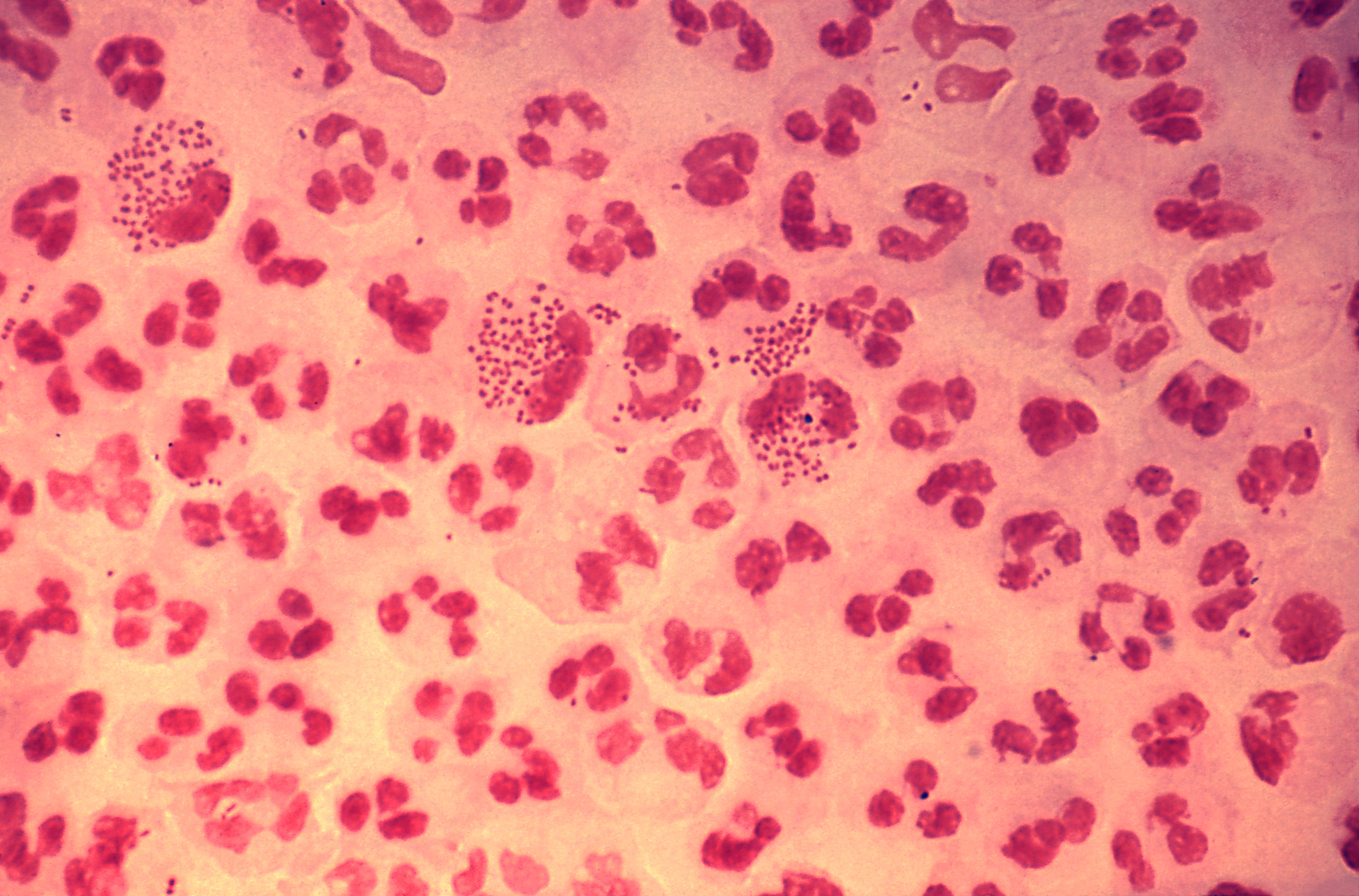
- Gram-stain of gonococcal urethritis. Note distribution in neutrophils and presence of both intracellular and extracellular bacteria. (CDC)

Scientific classification
- Domain: Bacteria
- Kingdom: Pseudomonadati
- Phylum: Pseudomonadota
- Class: Betaproteobacteria
- Order: Neisseriales
- Family: Neisseriaceae
- Genus: Neisseria
- Species: N. gonorrhoeae

Binomial name
- Neisseria gonorrhoeae (Zopf 1885) Trevisan 1885

Synonyms
- Micrococcus der Gonorrhoe Neisser 1879; Gonococcus neisseri Lindau 1898

= Neisseria gonorrhoeae =

Species of bacterium

Neisseria gonorrhoeae, also known as gonococcus (singular) or gonococci (plural), is a species of Gram-negative diplococci bacteria first isolated by Albert Neisser in 1879. An obligate human pathogen, it primarily colonizes the mucosal lining of the urogenital tract; however, it is also capable of adhering to the mucosa of the nose, pharynx, rectum, and conjunctiva. It causes the sexually transmitted genitourinary infection gonorrhea as well as other forms of gonococcal disease including disseminated gonococcemia, septic arthritis, and gonococcal ophthalmia neonatorum.

N. gonorrhoeae is oxidase positive and a microaerophile that is capable of surviving phagocytosis and growing inside neutrophils. Culturing it requires carbon dioxide supplementation and enriched agar (chocolate agar) with various antibiotics (Thayer–Martin). It exhibits antigenic variation through genetic recombination of its pili and surface proteins that interact with the immune system.

Sexual transmission is through vaginal, anal, or oral sex. Sexual transmission may be prevented through the use of barrier protection. Perinatal transmission may occur during childbirth, though it is preventable through antibiotic treatment of the mother before birth and application of antibiotic eye gel on the eyes of the newborn. Gonococcal infections do not result in protective immunity; therefore, individuals may be infected multiple times. Reinfection is possible due to N. gonorrhoeae's ability to evade the immune system by varying its surface proteins.

Asymptomatic infection is common in both males and females. Untreated infection may spread to the rest of the body (disseminated gonorrhea infection), especially the joints (septic arthritis). Untreated infection in women may cause pelvic inflammatory disease and possible infertility due to the resulting scarring. Gonorrhoea is diagnosed through cultures, Gram staining, or nucleic acid tests (i.e. polymerase chain reaction) of urine samples, urethral swabs, or cervical swabs. Chlamydia co-testing and testing for other STIs is recommended due to high rates of co-infection.

Antibiotic resistance in N. gonorrhoeae is a growing public health concern, especially given its propensity to develop resistance easily. This ability of N. gonorrhoeae to rapidly adapt to novel antimicrobial treatments has been seen several times since the 1930s, making numerous treatment plans obsolete. Some strains have exhibited resistance to the current ceftriaxone treatments.

== Microbiology ==
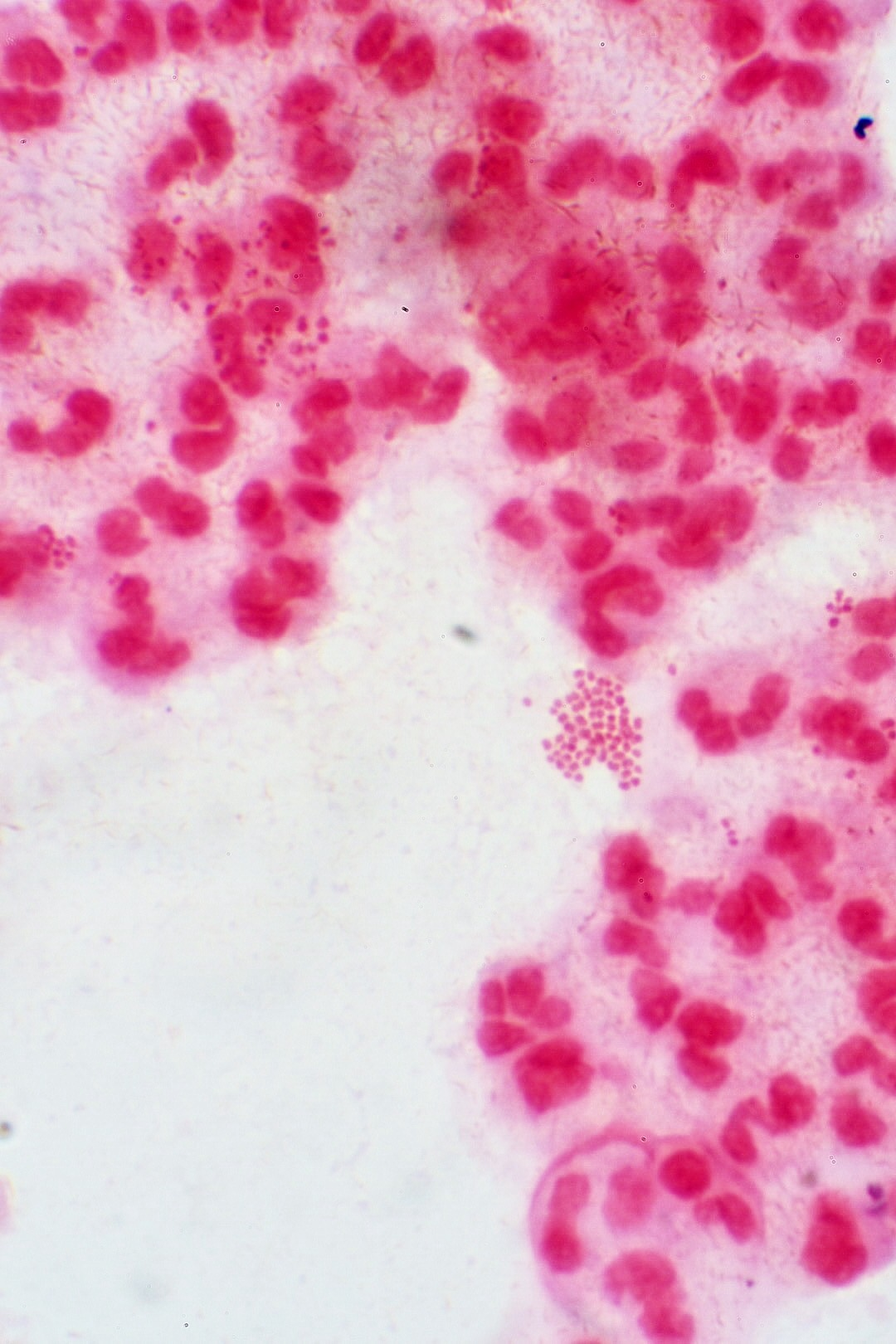
A Gram stain of a urethral exudate showing typical intracellular Gram-negative diplococci, which is diagnostic for gonococcal urethritis

Neisseria species are fastidious, Gram-negative cocci (though some species are rod-shaped and occur in pairs or short chains) that require nutrient supplementation to grow in laboratory cultures. They are facultative intracellular pathogens, meaning they can persist and colonize within host cells but can also multiply outside the host cellular environment. They typically appear in pairs (diplococci), resembling the shape of coffee beans. Members of this genus do not form endospores and are nonmotile, except for pathogenic species, which are capable of moving using twitching motility; most are also obligate aerobes. Of the 17 species that colonize humans, only two are pathogenic: N. gonorrhoeae, which causes gonorrhea, and N. meningitidis, a leading cause of bacterial meningitis.

=== Culture and identification ===
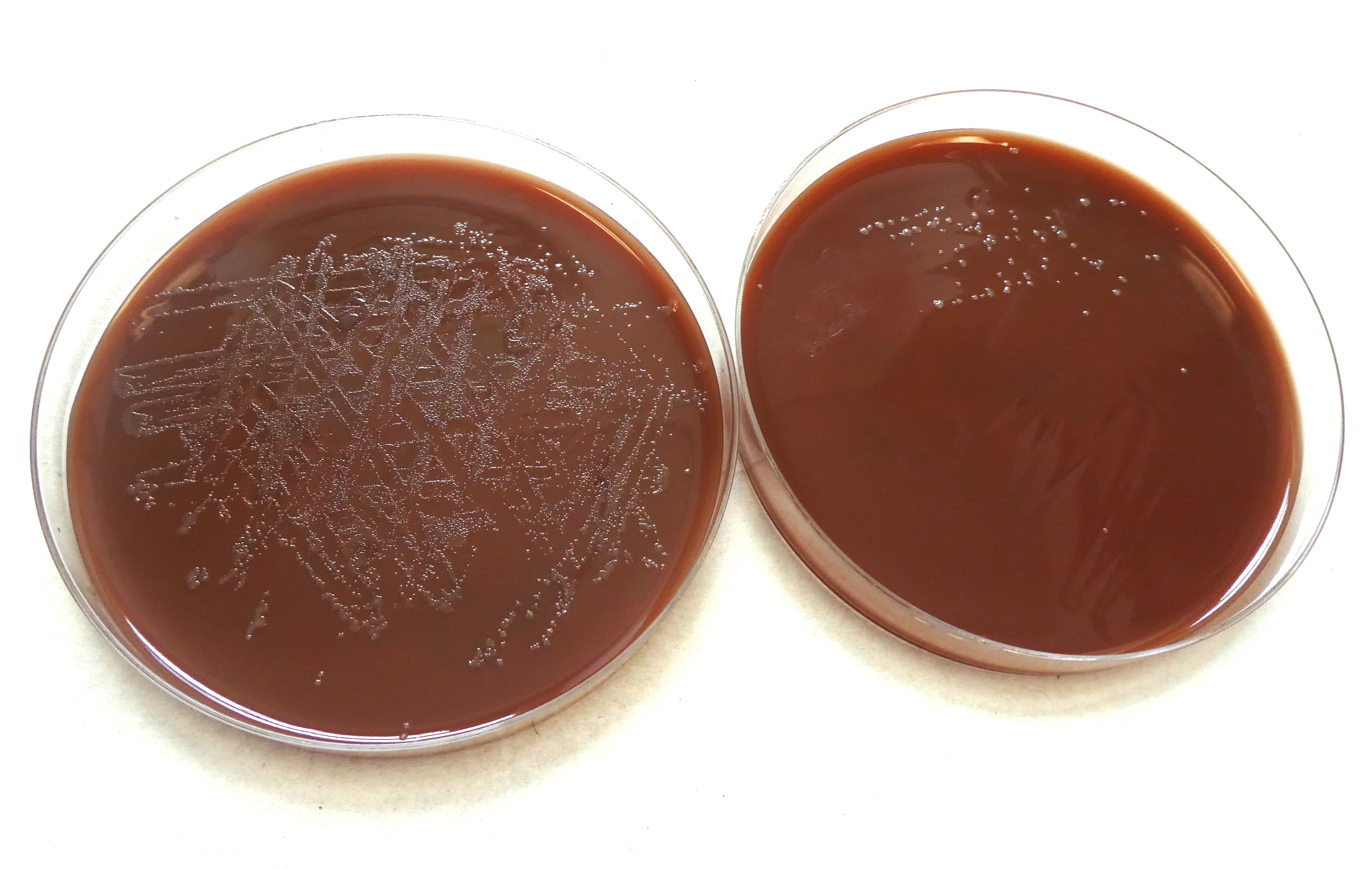
Thayer–Martin agar is selective for growth of Neisseria species. Further testing (oxidase, carbohydrate use, and PCR) can be used to differentiate N. gonorrhoeae from N. meningitidis.

N. gonorrhoeae can be isolated on Thayer–Martin agar (or VPN) agar in an atmosphere enriched with 3-7% carbon dioxide. This agar preparation facilitates the growth of Neisseria species while inhibiting the growth of contaminating bacteria and fungi. Martin Lewis and New York City agar are other types of selective chocolate agar commonly used for Neisseria culture. N. gonorrhoeae is oxidase positive (possessing cytochrome c oxidase) and catalase positive (able to convert hydrogen peroxide to oxygen). When incubated with the carbohydrates lactose, maltose, sucrose, and glucose, N. gonorrhoeae will only ferment the glucose.

== Metabolism ==
=== Carbon ===
Unlike other Neisseria species that can also metabolize maltose, N. gonorrhoeae is capable of using only glucose, pyruvate, and lactate as central carbon sources, and glucose is catabolized via both the Entner-Doudoroff (ED) and pentose phosphate (PP) pathways, and the ED pathway is the primary oxidative method. Use of these pathways is necessary as N. gonorrhoeae is incapable of glucose catabolism via the Embden-Meyerhof-Parnas (EMP) pathway due to its lack of the phosphofructokinase (PFK) gene; however, the fructose 1,6-bisphosphatase enzyme is present to allow for gluconeogenesis to occur.

Pyruvate produced through the EMP pathway is then converted into acetyl-CoA, which goes on to contribute to the citric acid cycle to generate biosynthetic precursors and produce ATP. Due to the inhibited expression of several CAC enzymes, namely citrate synthase, aconitase, and isocitrate dehydrogenase in the presence of glucose, pyruvate, or lactate, the CAC is geared more towards synthesis of biosynthetic precursors, such as oxaloacetate, than ATP production. Another differentiating aspect of the gonococcal CAC is the lack of malate dehydrogenase, which is instead replaced by a membrane-bound malate:quinone-oxidoreductase that operates independently of NAD^{+} by directly transferring electrons to ubiquinone.

Alternatively, acetyl-CoA that does not enter the CAC can generate ATP through Substrate-level phosphorylation. When other carbon sources such as glucose or lactate are present, acetate is excreted from the cell or incorporated for lipid synthesis. N. gonorrhoeae lacks the glyoxylate shunt, preventing it from using acetate to form CAC intermediates to replenish the cycle.

A significant portion of the glyceraldehyde 3-phosphate formed in gonococci is recycled via Gluconeogenesis to produce intermediates used in the Pentose phosphate pathway for nucleotide biosynthesis.

N. gonorrhoeae, like other pathogenic members of the genus Neisseria, are capnophiles, meaning they require higher-than-normal concentrations of carbon dioxide (CO_{2}) to grow, either in the form of CO_{2} or bicarbonate (HCO_{3}^{−}) depending on the bacterial strain. This requirement must be met exogenously during the lag and stationary growth phases, though it appears to be met through high metabolic CO_{2} productions in the exponential phase. Assimilation of this CO_{2} in Neisseria species is done by carbonic anhydrase and phosphoenolpyruvate enzymes in the periplasmic space and the cytoplasm, respectively.

Lactate catabolism is also of particular importance for gonococcal pathogenicity and growth. External lactate is transported in to the cell via lactate permease (LctP). The N. gonorrhoeae genome encodes for three lactate dehydrogenase (LDH) enzymes for that allow for metabolism of both L-lactate and D-lactate: a cytoplasmic NAD^{+}-dependent D-lactate dehydrogenase (LdhA), which is responsible for and two membrane-bound LDHs, one specific to L-lactate (LldD) and the other specific to D-lactate (LdhD). The membrane-bound LDHs directly oxidize lactate to reduce ubiquinone, contributing to the electron transport chain.

=== Electron transport chain and oxidative phosphorylation ===
As an obligate human pathogen and a facultative anaerobic capnophile, Neisseria gonorrhoeae typically colonizes mucosal surfaces in microaerobic environments, such as those in the genitourinary tract. Growth in areas where oxygen concentrations are limited requires a terminal oxidase with a high affinity for oxygen. In gonococci, oxygen reduction is performed by a ccb_{3} -type cytochrome oxidase. In addition to aerobic respiration, gonococci can also perform anaerobic respiration via the reduction of nitrite (NO_{2}) to nitric oxide (NO) as well as reduction of NO to nitrous oxide (N_{2}O).

Several enzymes contribute electrons to the intramembranous ubiquinone pool, the first step in the ETC. These include the membrane-bound LDHs (LldD and LdhD), NADH:ubiquinone oxidoreductase (aka NADH dehydrogenase; Nuo complex I), Na^{+}-translocating NADH dehydrogenase (Nqr), succinate dehydrogenase (SDH), and the membrane-bound NAD^{+}-independent malate:quinone-oxidoreductase (MqR).

In the gonococcal Electron transport chain, electrons can pass through the cytochrome bc_{1} complex or are transferred to NO by NO reductase (NorB) as a terminal electron acceptor. Under aerobic conditions, cytochrome ccb_{3} oxidase reduces O_{2} to form H_{2}O.

Gonococci also reduce NO_{2} via an inducible outer membrane-attached copper-containing nitrite reductase (AniA, a member of the NirK protein family) under anaerobic conditions, though this process has also been noted in microaerobic conditions as a means of supplementing growth. This leads to the formation of NO that is subsequently reduced to N_{2}O in a partial denitrification pathway.The ccb_{3} oxidase of N. gonorrhoeae, dissimilarly to other members of the Neisseria genus, is a tri-heme protein that can transfer electrons not only to O_{2} (conserved across Neisseria species) but also to AniA for NO_{2} reduction.

In N. gonorrhoeae, oxidative phosphorylation is supported by proton translocation through the Nuo complex I, cytochrome bc1 complex, and cbb3 oxidase. Then, ATP synthesis is performed by the F_{1}F_{0} ATP synthase.

=== Iron ===
To acquire the necessary iron, gonococci produce TonB-dependent transporters (TDTs) on the surface of their outer membrane that can directly extract iron, along with other metals, from their respective carrier proteins. Some of these include transferrin binding proteins A (TbpA) and B (TbpB), lactoferrin-binding proteins A (LbpA) and B (LbpB), and hemoglobin/hemoglobin-haptoglobin binding proteins HpuB and HpuA. Gonococcal iron aquisition is higly adapted to the human host. It can get iron from human transferrin and lactoferrin but not their corresponding nonhuman proteins. However, the ability to use lactoferrin varies among different strains. In addition to these proteins, gonococci are also capable of using siderophores, or compounds that are capable of chelating iron in the environment, that are produced by other bacteria; however, gonococcal cells are incapable of synthesizing siderophores themselves. These xenosiderophores are taken up by the TDT FetA through the outer membrane and then brought into the cell by the fetBCDEF transporter system.

Along with the sequestration defence that can be further upregulated by host inflammation, humans also produce siderocalins that can chelate siderophores as a further method of inhibiting pathogenic bacterial growth. These are sometimes ineffective against N. gonorrhoeae, which can colonize intracellularly, particularly in phagocytic cells such as macrophages and neutrophils. Increases in host intracellular iron also downregulate some of the intracellular pathogen-killing mechanisms; coincidentally, pathogenic Neisseria can alter several host cell mechanisms that ultimately allow the pathogen to take most of the available iron from the host immune cell.

=== Surface molecules ===
On its surface, N. gonorrhoeae bears hair-like pili, surface proteins with various functions, and sugars called lipooligosaccharide. The pili mediate adherence, movement, and DNA exchange. The opacity-associated (Opa) proteins interact with the immune system, as do the porins. Lipooligosaccharide is an endotoxin that provokes an immune response. All of these are antigenic and exhibit antigenic variation. The pili, Opa proteins, porins, and even the lipooligosaccharide have mechanisms to inhibit the immune response, making asymptomatic infection possible.

==== Opa proteins ====
Phase-variable opacity-associated (Opa) proteins are outer-membrane proteins used by N. gonorrhoeae to attach to host cells and evade their immune response. They undergo phase variation, meaning their expression can be switched on or off by changes in repeated DNA sequences. Different Opa variants help N. gonorrhoeae adapt to different environments, increasing the length of infection and the amount of invasion into other host cells.

Many Opa proteins bind to receptors known as carcinoembryonic antigen-related cell adhesion molecules, or CEACAMs, which are found on certain epithelial and immune cells. Some can also bind to heparan sulfate proteoglycans, which provide another way for the bacteria to attach to host cells. When certain Opa proteins bind to CEACAM1 receptors on T cells, they can interfere with the body's ability to respond to the infection and allow the bacteria to survive for longer periods. However, not all Opa proteins have the same effects as their functions depend on which receptors they bind to and the type of host cell involved. In particular, Opa proteins that bind to CEACAM3 receptors on neutrophils can promote bacterial internalization and killing while activating signaling pathways associated with cytokine production and inflammation.

==== Type IV pili ====
Neisseria gonorrhoeae use their type IV pili as a motility structure. These are the steps for the type IV pilus twitching motility mechanism.

Dynamic polymeric protein filaments called type IV pili allow N. gonorrhoeae to do many bacterial processes, including adhesion to surfaces, transformation competence, twitching motility, and immune response evasions. To enter the host the bacteria uses the pili to adhere to and penetrate mucosal surfaces. The pili are a pivotal virulence factor for N. gonorrhoeae; without them, the bacterium is unable to promote colonization. Type IV pili enable Twitching motility in N. gonorrhoeae through repeated extension, attachment, and retraction. N. gonorrhoeae can pull 100,000 times its own weight, and the pili used to do so are amongst the strongest biological motors known to date, exerting one nanonewton. The PilF and PilT ATPase proteins are responsible for powering the extension and retraction of the type IV pilus, respectively. The adhesive functions of the gonococcal pilus play a role in microcolony aggregation and biofilm formation. These pili are also used to avoid immune responses from the cell they are invading by having their type IV pili antigenically vary. The main pilus filament is replaced by variable DNA sequences very frequently. By doing this process rapidly, they can create a diversity of pili on their surface and evade the host cell's immune response.

==== Lipooligosaccharide ====
Lipooligosaccharide is a low-weight version of lipopolysaccharide present on the surfaces of most other Gram-negative bacteria. As an endotoxin, it provokes inflammation. The shedding of lipooligosaccharide by the bacteria is sometimes responsible for issues associated with pelvic inflammatory disease. Although it functions primarily as an endotoxin, lipooligosaccharide may disguise itself with host sialic acid and block initiation of the complement cascade.

=== Antigenic variation ===
N. gonorrhoeae evades the immune system through a process called antigenic variation. This process allows N. gonorrhoeae to recombine its genes and alter the antigenic determinants on its surface, such as Type IV pili. The pili exhibit the most antigenic variation due to chromosomal rearrangement. The pilS gene allows it to rearrange, as combination with the pilE gene is estimated to produce over 100 variants of the PilE protein. These changes allow N. gonorrhoeae to evade recognition by targeted antibodies and challenge formation of effective vaccines.

In addition to gene rearrangement, it is also naturally competent, meaning it can acquire extracellular DNA from the environment via its type IV pilus, specifically proteins PilQ and PilT. These processes allow N. gonorrhoeae to acquire and spread new genes, disguise itself with different surface proteins, and prevent the development of immunological memory – an ability which has contributed to antibiotic resistance and impeded vaccine development.

=== Phase variation ===
Phase variation results in the activation or deactivation of a gene, as opposed to antigenic variation causing changes at the genetic level, altering the composition of molecules. Phase variation most often arises from a frameshift in the expressed gene. The Opa proteins of N. gonorrhoeae rely strictly on phase variation. Every time the bacteria replicate, they may switch multiple Opa proteins on or off through slipped-strand mispairing; which introduces frameshift mutations that bring genes in or out of frame, resulting in different Opa genes being translated every time. Pili are varied by phase variation. Frameshifts occur in the pilE and pilC genes, turning off the expression of pili in situations where they are not needed, such as during intracellular colonization.

=== Survival of gonococci ===
After gonococci invade and transcytose the host epithelial cells, they land in the submucosa, where neutrophils promptly consume them. The pili and Opa proteins on the surface may interfere with phagocytosis, but most gonococci end up in neutrophils. The exudates from infected individuals contain many neutrophils with ingested gonococci. Neutrophils release an oxidative burst of reactive oxygen species in their phagosomes to kill the gonococci. However, a significant fraction of the gonococci can resist killing through the action of their catalase, which breaks down reactive oxygen species and can reproduce within the neutrophil phagosomes.

The bacterial RecA protein, which mediates repair of DNA damage, plays a crucial role in gonococcal survival. N. gonorrhoeae may replace DNA damaged in neutrophil phagosomes with DNA from neighboring gonococci. The process in which recipient gonococci integrate DNA from neighboring gonococci into their genome is called transformation.

The growth of N. gonorrhoeae colonies on New York City agar, a specialized and selective medium for gonococci

== Genome ==
N. gonorrhoeae is a polyploid, containing at least two copies of its chromosome per coccal cell. Its genome also has many repetitive sequences that add to its genetic variation. Correia repeat enclosed elements (CREE) account for more than 5% of the gonococcal genome and can influence transcription termination and mRNA stability.

The genomes of several strains of N. gonorrhoeae have been sequenced. Most of them are about 2.1 Mb in size and encode 2,100 to 2,600 proteins (although most seem to be in the lower range). For instance, strain NCCP11945 consists of one circular chromosome (2,232,025 bp) encoding 2,662 predicted open reading frames (ORFs) and one plasmid (4,153 bp) encoding 12 predicted ORFs. The estimated coding density over the entire genome is 87%, and the average G+C content is 52.4%, values that are similar to those of strain FA1090. The NCCP11945 genome encodes 54 tRNAs and four copies of 16S-23S-5S rRNA operons.

=== Horizontal gene transfer ===
Horizontal gene transfer, also termed lateral gene transfer, is the sharing of genetic information amongst living organisms. This transmission of information is a driving force of antibiotic resistance in N. gonorrhoeae. Studies have identified that N. gonorrhoeae has obtained methods of antimicrobial resistance by way of horizontal gene transfer from other Neisseria species including N. lactamica, N. macacae, and N. mucosa.

Transformation in N. gonorrhoeae is performed by the type IV pilus, where the DNA is bound and brought into the cell, followed by processing and homologous recombination.

Found in some genomes of Neisseria gonorrhoeae, the gonococcal genetic island (GGI), a genomic island (GI) specific to gonococci, has been identified as a mobile genetic element that is horizontally acquired. GGI is involved with antimicrobial resistance, transmission of genetic information, and iron acquisition. The genes within the gonococcal genetic island encode for the infamous type IV secretion system (T4SS), which is responsible for DNA secretion and is essential for biofilm formation.

In 2011, researchers at Northwestern University found evidence of a human DNA fragment in the genome of N. gonorrhoeae , the first example of horizontal gene transfer from humans to a bacterial pathogen.

== Disease ==
=== Symptoms ===
Symptoms of infection with N. gonorrhoeae differ depending on the site of infection and many infections are asymptomatic independent of sex. Depending on the route of transmission, N. gonorrhoeae may cause infection of the throat (pharyngitis) or infection of the anus/rectum (proctitis). N. gonorrhoeae can also affect other anatomical sites including the urethra, cervix, rectum, pharynx (throat), and eyes.

Disseminated gonococcal infections can occur when N. gonorrhoeae enters the bloodstream (gonococcemia), often spreading to the joints and causing a rash (dermatitis-arthritis syndrome). Dermatitis-arthritis syndrome results in joint pain (arthritis), tendon inflammation (tenosynovitis), and painless non-pruritic (non-itchy) dermatitis. Disseminated infection and pelvic inflammatory disease in women tend to begin after menses due to reflux during menses, facilitating spread. In rare cases, disseminated infection may cause infection of the meninges of the brain and spinal cord (meningitis) or infection of the heart valves (endocarditis).

==== Male ====
Symptoms usually develop within several days of exposure to N. gonorrhoeae, although some men may be asymptomatic. In symptomatic men, the primary symptom of genitourinary infection is urethritis – burning with urination (dysuria), increased urge to urinate, and a pus-like (purulent) discharge from the penis. The discharge may be foul-smelling. If untreated, scarring of the urethra may result in difficulty urinating. Infection may spread from the urethra in the penis to nearby structures, including the testicles (epididymitis/orchitis), or to the prostate (prostatitis).

==== Female ====
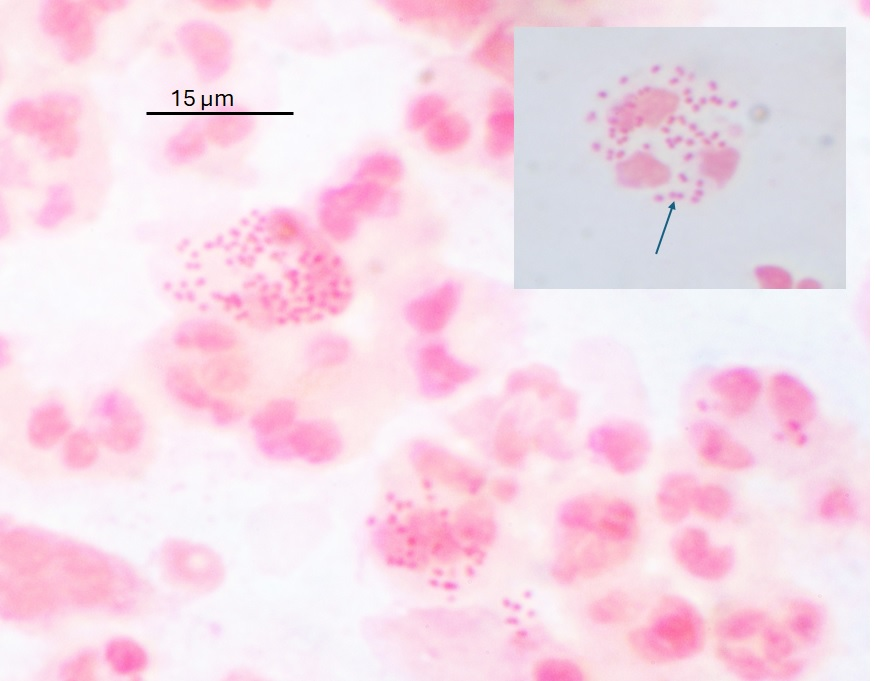
Gram stain of a vaginal swab showing gonococci (in pairs - arrow) inside polymorphonuclear granulocytes

In symptomatic women, the primary symptoms of genitourinary infection are increased vaginal discharge, burning with urination (dysuria), increased urge to urinate, pain with intercourse, or menstrual abnormalities. Pelvic inflammatory disease results if N. gonorrhoeae ascends into the pelvic peritoneum (via the cervix, endometrium, and fallopian tubes). The resulting inflammation and scarring of the fallopian tubes can lead to infertility and an increased risk of ectopic pregnancy. Pelvic inflammatory disease develops in 10 to 20% of the females infected with N. gonorrhoeae.

==== Neonates (perinatal infection) ====
In perinatal infection, the primary manifestation is infection of the eye (neonatal conjunctivitis or ophthalmia neonatorum) when the newborn is exposed to N. gonorrhoeae in the birth canal. The eye infection can lead to corneal scarring or perforation, ultimately resulting in blindness. If the newborn is exposed during birth, conjunctivitis occurs within 2–5 days after birth and is severe. Gonococcal ophthalmia neonatorum, once common in newborns, is prevented by the application of erythromycin (antibiotic) gel to the eyes of babies at birth as a public health measure. Silver nitrate is no longer used in the United States.

=== Transmission ===
N. gonorrhoeae is most often transmitted through vaginal, oral, or anal sex; nonsexual transmission is unlikely in adult infection. It can also be transmitted to a newborn during passage through the birth canal if the mother has an untreated genitourinary infection. Given the high rate of asymptomatic infection, it is recommended that pregnant women be tested for gonococcal infection before birth. Communal baths, shared towels or fabrics, rectal thermometers, and improper hand hygiene by caregivers have been identified as potential means of transmission in pediatric settings.

Traditionally, the bacterium was thought to move attached to spermatozoa, but this hypothesis did not explain female-to-male transmission of the disease. A recent study suggests that rather than "surf" on wiggling sperm, N. gonorrhoeae bacteria use pili to anchor onto proteins in the sperm and move through coital fluid.

=== Infection ===
Successful transmission is followed by adherence to the epithelial cells found at the infected mucosal site by the bacterium's type IV pili. The pili's ability to attach and subsequently retract pulls N. gonorrhoeae towards the epithelial membrane at the surface of the mucosal cell. Post attachment, N. gonorrhoeae replicates its genome and divides to form microcolonies. Gonococcal infection is sometimes aided by the membrane cofactor protein, CD46, as it has been known to act as a receptor for gonococcal pilus. Additionally, interaction with pili has been shown to cause cytoskeletal rearrangement of the host cell, further demonstrating that gonococcal pili engagement disrupts the response of the host cell and increases the likelihood of successful infection. During growth and colonization, N. gonorrhoeae stimulates the release of pro-inflammatory cytokines and chemokines from host immune cells that result in the recruitment of neutrophils to the area. These phagocytic cells typically take in foreign pathogens and destroy them; however, N. gonorrhoeae's ability to manipulate the host cell response allows the pathogen to survive within these immune cells and evade elimination.

=== Serum resistance ===
As a Gram negative bacterium, N. gonorrhoeae requires defense mechanisms to protect itself against the complement system (or complement cascade), whose components are found with human serum. There are three different pathways that activate this system however, they all result in the activation of complement protein 3 (C3). A cleaved portion of this protein, C3b, is deposited on pathogenic surfaces and results in opsonization as well as the downstream activation of the membrane attack complex. N. gonorrhoeae has several mechanisms to avoid this action. As a whole, these mechanisms are referred to as serum resistance.

== History ==
=== Name origin ===
Neisseria gonorrhoeae is named for German physician Albert Neisser, who isolated it as the causative agent of the disease gonorrhea in 1879. Galen (130 AD) coined the term "gonorrhea" from the Greek gonos which means "seed" and rhoe which means "flow". Thus, gonorrhea means "flow of seed", a description referring to the white penile discharge, assumed to be semen by early doctors, seen in male infection.

Gonorrhea has also been referred to as "the clap," which may originate from the French term clapier. A clapier was a French brothel, a place where such a disease could easily spread. Another theory of the term "the clap" is that it originates from a time before antibiotics when Neisseria gonorrhoeae would be treated by clapping the penis between two boards to force out the infected discharge.

=== Discovery ===
In 1878, Albert Neisser isolated and visualized N. gonorrhoeae diplococci in samples of pus from 35 men and women with the classic symptoms of genitourinary infection with gonorrhea – two of whom also had infections of the eyes. In 1882, Leistikow and Loeffler were able to grow the organism in culture. Then in 1883, Max Bockhart proved conclusively that the bacterium isolated by Albert Neisser was the causative agent of the disease known as gonorrhea by inoculating the penis of a healthy man with the bacteria. The man developed the classic symptoms of gonorrhea days after, satisfying the last of Koch's postulates. Until this point, researchers debated whether syphilis and gonorrhea were manifestations of the same disease or two distinct entities. One such 18th-century researcher, John Hunter, tried to settle the debate in 1767 by inoculating a man with pus taken from a patient with gonorrhea. He erroneously concluded that syphilis and gonorrhea were indeed the same disease when the man developed the copper-colored rash that is classic for syphilis. Although many sources repeat that Hunter inoculated himself, others have argued that it was another man. After Hunter's experiment other scientists sought to disprove his conclusions by inoculating other male physicians, medical students, and incarcerated men with gonorrheal pus, who all developed the burning and discharge of gonorrhea. One researcher, Ricord, took the initiative to perform 667 inoculations of gonorrheal pus on patients of a mental hospital, with zero cases of syphilis. Notably, the advent of penicillin in the 1940s made effective treatments for gonorrhea available.

== See also ==
- Neisseria meningitidis
