= New York City agar =

The NYC (New York City) medium or GC (Neisseria gonorrhoeae) medium agar is a type of selective media used for isolating Gonococci and N. meningitidis.

The growth of Neisseria gonorrhoeae colonies on New York City medium agar

== Composition ==
The agar base is composed of:

Ingredients	Grams per litre
Proteose peptone	15
Corn starch	1
Glucose	5
Sodium chloride	5
Dipotassium hydrogen phosphate	4
Potassium dihydrogen phosphate	1
Agar	20

Final pH ( at 25°C) 7.4±0.2

== Background and principles ==
NYC Agar Base was originally developed by Fauer, Weisburd and Wilson at the New York City Department of Health for selective isolation of pathogenic Neisseria species from clinical specimens. It consists of primarily a peptone-corn starch agar-base buffered with phosphates and supplemented with horse plasma, horse haemoglobin, dextrose, yeast autolysate and antibiotics. This medium is superior to other media generally employed for the isolation of Neisseria species. The transparent nature of the medium helps in studying the colonial types.

Proteose peptone, horse plasma, haemoglobin provide nutrients for the growth of N. gonorrhoeae and N. meningitidis. Phosphate buffers the medium. The selective supplement added contains the antibiotics vancomycin, colistin, nystatin and trimethoprim, to suppress the accompanying flora. Vancomycin is inhibitory for gram-positive bacteria. Colistin inhibits gram negative bacteria, including Pseudomonas species, while Proteus is inhibited by trimethoprim. The combination of trimethoprim and colistin acts synergistically against gram-negative bacilli. Starch neutralizes the toxic metabolites produced by Neisseria. The yeast autolysate supplement fulfils the CO_{2} requirements needed to enhance Neisseria growth. Yeast contains oxaloacetic acid which is metabolized by gonococci to produce sufficient CO_{2} for growth of capnophilic gonococci. Also, presence of yeast autolysate reduces the lag phase of growth of Neisseria, thus enhancing both size and number of colonies. The specimen can be directly streaked on the medium to obtain maximum isolation.

== Procedure ==
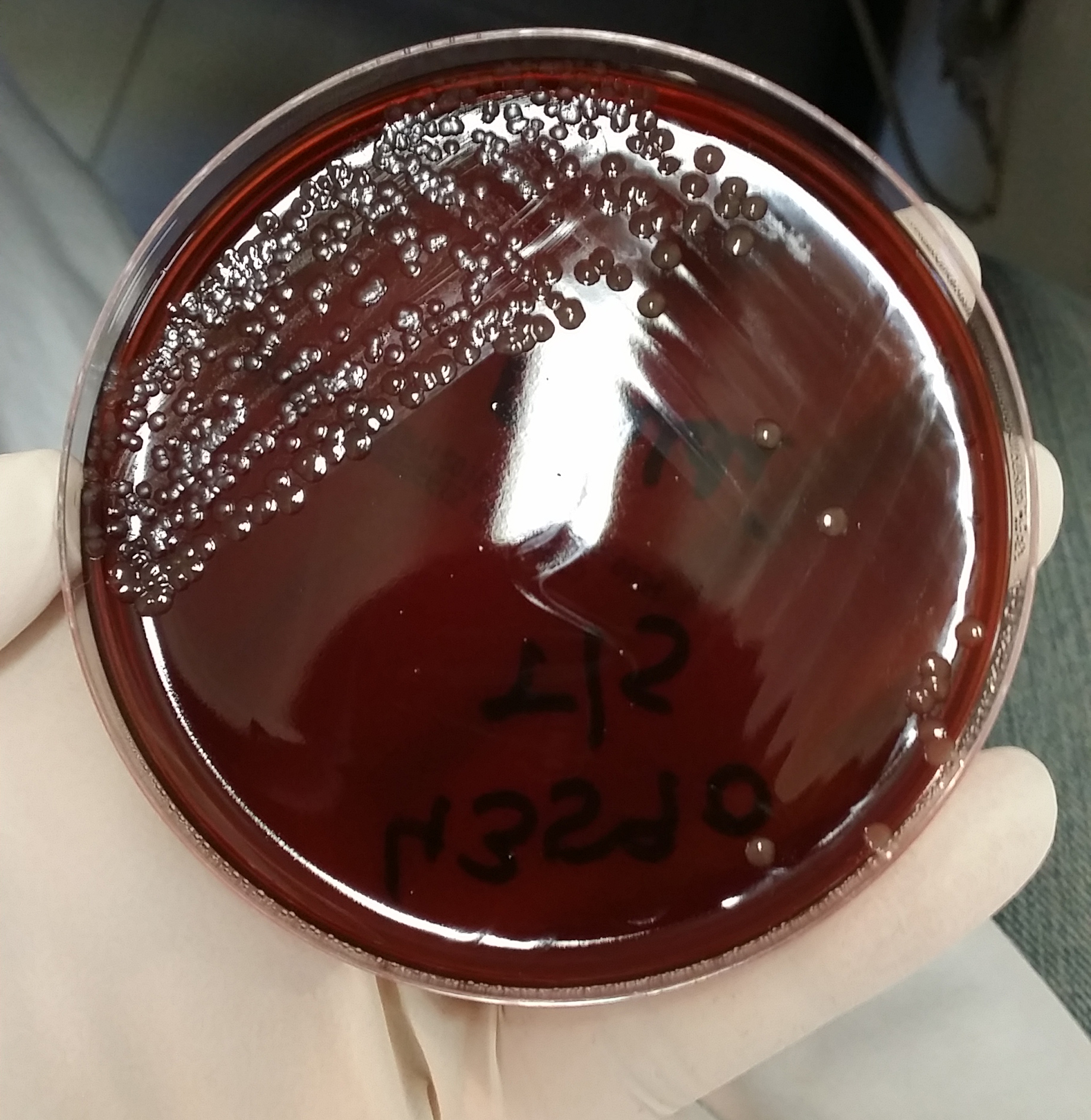
The growth of Neisseria meningitidis colonies on New York City Medium Agar

Streak the specimen as soon as possible after it is received in the laboratory. If material is being cultured directly from a swab, proceed as follows:

1. Roll swab directly on the medium in a large “Z” to provide adequate exposure of swab to the medium for transfer of organisms.
2. Cross-streak the “Z” pattern with a sterile wire loop, preferably in the clinic. If not done previously, cross-streaking should be done in the laboratory.
3. Place the culture as soon as possible in an aerobic environment enriched with carbon dioxide.
4. Incubate at 35 ± 2 °C and examine after overnight incubation and again after approximately 48 hours.
5. Subculture for identification of N. gonorrhoeae should be made within 18–24 hours. If shipped after incubation, colonies should be subcultured before performing biochemical identification tests in order to ensure that adequate viability is achieved.

== Expected results ==
Typical colonial morphology is as follows:

N. gonorrhoeae may appear as small (0.5–1.0 mm) grayish white to colorless mucoid colonies. N. meningitidis appears as large colorless to bluish-gray mucoid colonies.

Colonies may be selected for Gram-staining, subculturing or other diagnostic procedures.
