= Antibiotic resistance in gonorrhea =

Treatment-resistant bacterium

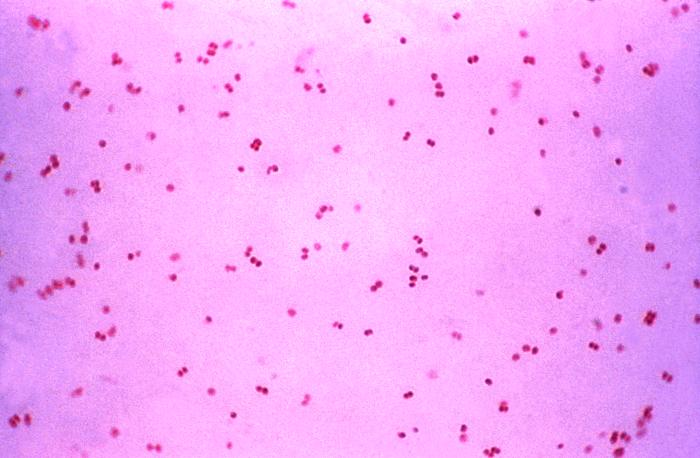
Gram stain of Neisseria gonorrhoeae showing characteristic diplococci morphology

Neisseria gonorrhoeae, the bacterium that causes the sexually transmitted infection gonorrhea, has developed antibiotic resistance to many antibiotics. The bacteria was first identified in 1879.

In the 1940s effective treatment with penicillin became available, but by the 1970s resistant strains predominated. Resistance to penicillin has developed through two mechanisms: chromosomally mediated resistance (CMRNG) and penicillinase-mediated resistance (PPNG). CMRNG involves step wise mutation of penA, which codes for the penicillin-binding protein (PBP-2); mtr, which encodes an efflux pump that removes penicillin from the cell; and penB, which encodes the bacterial cell wall porins. PPNG involves the acquisition of a plasmid-borne beta-lactamase. N. gonorrhoeae has a high affinity for horizontal gene transfer, and as a result, the existence of any strain resistant to a given drug could spread easily across strains.

Cases of Neisseria Gonorrhoeae with decreased susceptibility or resistance to antibiotics (2017-2018).

Fluoroquinolones were a useful next-line treatment until resistance was achieved through efflux pumps and mutations to the gyrA gene, which encodes DNA gyrase. Third-generation cephalosporins have been used to treat gonorrhea since 2007, but resistant strains have emerged. As of 2010, the recommended treatment is a single 250 mg intramuscular injection of ceftriaxone, sometimes in combination with azithromycin or doxycycline. However, certain strains of N. gonorrhoeae can be resistant to antibiotics that are normally used to treat it. These include: cefixime (an oral cephalosporin), ceftriaxone (an injectable cephalosporin), azithromycin, aminoglycosides, and tetracycline.

== Penicillins ==
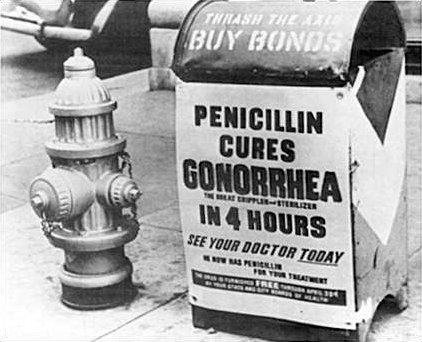
Old advertisement for penicillin treatment

Beta-lactams like penicillin were widely used to treat gonorrhea in the 1940s. There are three general mechanisms that may allow bacteria to become resistant to beta-lactam antibiotics:

1. inability to access/target penicillin-binding protein (PBP) enzyme
2. inhibition of binding to PBP via modification of the enzyme
3. hydrolysis/inactivation of the antibiotic by beta-lactamases.

Overuse of penicillin contributed to Neisseria gonorrhoeae developing high resistance to penicillin through two main mechanisms: chromosomally mediated resistance (CMRNG) and penicillinase-mediated resistance (PPNG).

Chromosomally mediated resistance occurred through step-wise changes over many years. Chromosomal mutations in the penA, mtr, and penB genes are the major mechanisms for CMRNG. The penA gene encodes an alternative penicillin-binding protein, PBP-2. This mechanism falls under the second general mechanism for beta-lactam resistance. PBPs, also known as transpeptidases, are targets for beta-lactams. These enzymes (PBPs) are involved in peptidoglycan synthesis which is a major component of the bacterial cell wall. PBPs cross-link the amino acid strands of peptidoglycan during synthesis. Normally, beta-lactams bind the PBPs and thereby inhibit the cross-linking of peptidoglycan. When this occurs, the cell wall of the bacterium is compromised and often results in cell death. When N. gonorrhoeae encodes penA, the new PBP-2 that is synthesized is no longer recognized by the beta-lactams rendering the bacterium resistant.

The mtr (multiple transferable resistance) gene encodes for an efflux pump. Efflux pumps mediate resistance to a variety of compounds including antibiotics, detergents, and dyes. This mechanism falls under the first general resistance mechanism to beta-lactams. mtr encodes for the protein MtrD which is the efflux pump for N. gonorrhoeae. MtrD is among the Resistance Nodulation Division (RND) efflux pump superfamily. These pumps are proton antiporters where the antibiotic is pumped out of the cell while a proton is pumped into the cell.

The cell wall of N. gonorrhoeae contains porins which are holes within the cell wall in which some molecules are able to diffuse into or out of the cell membrane. This mechanism falls under the first general mechanism for beta-lactam resistance. The penB gene encodes the porins for N. gonorrhoeae and when this gene undergoes mutations, there is a decrease in permeability of the cell wall to hydrophilic antibiotics like penicillin.

Penicillinase-mediated resistance in N. gonorrhoeae is mediated by the plasmid borne TEM-1 type beta-lactamase which falls under the third general mechanism for beta-lactam resistance. There have been over 200 beta-lactamases described and some of them are antibiotic specific. TEM-1 is a penicillinase specific for penicillins. This enzyme will bind to the beta-lactam ring which is a structural characteristic for beta-lactams and hydrolyze the ring. This renders the antibiotic inactive. The spread of the penicillinase resistance was much faster compared to the chromosomal-mediated resistance mechanisms. The plasmids containing TEM-1 could be passed from bacterium to bacterium via conjugation

== Quinolones ==
Quinolones are a class of synthetic antibiotics that inhibit DNA replication, recombination, and repair by interacting with the bacterial DNA gyrase and/or topoisomerase IV. Second generation quinolones like ciprofloxacin and ofloxacin have been widely used to treat N. gonorrhoeae infections. Resistance to these antibiotics has developed over the years with chromosomal resistance being the primary mechanism.

Low-level quinolone resistance has been linked to changes in cell permeability and efflux pumps. The NorM efflux pump is encoded by the norM gene and provides resistance to fluoroquinolones. The NorM efflux pump is a member of the MATE (multidrug and toxic compound extrusion) family and functions by a Na+ antiporter. It is also known that a point mutation upstream of the norM gene will causes overexpression of NorM, and mediate elevated resistance.

High-level resistance to quinolones has been seen through target modification acting on the DNA gyrase and topoisomerase IV. Multiple amino acid substation mutations in the gyrA gene, which encodes for the DNA gyrase, have been seen extensively. DNA gyrase is an enzyme that binds to DNA and introduces negative supercoiling. This helps unwind the DNA for replication. If there is a mutation in the DNA gyrase, then the quinolone will not be able to bind to it resulting in the activity of DNA gyrase not being inhibited. Multiple mutations have also been noted in the parC gene which encodes for the topoisomerase IV. Topoisomerase IV acts similarly to DNA gyrase and is involved in unwinding DNA for replication.

== Cephalosporins ==
Basic structures of penicillins(1) and cephalosporins(2) with beta-lactam ring highlighted in red

Ceftriaxone and cefixime are third generation cephalosporins and are often used as treatments for N. gonorrhoeae infections. The cephalosporins are part of a larger beta-lactam family of antibiotics. The newly discovered H041 strain of N. gonorrhoeae, originally isolated from a commercial sex worker in Japan, was shown to be resistant to this antibiotic.

The possible mechanisms of resistance to this antibiotic are as follows:

1. an alteration of more than four amino acids in the C-terminal end of the PBP-2, which would result in the antibiotic being unable to bind to its target
2. mutations in the promoter regions of mtr, resulting in the overexpression of genes that code for efflux pumps
3. mutations in the penB gene that encodes for the bacterial porin. This form of resistance has only been observed with ceftriaxone which is administered through an intramuscular injection.

== Tetracyclines ==
Tetracyclines are a class of antibiotics that inhibit protein synthesis by binding to the 30s ribosomal subunit of bacterial cells, keeping transcription of the bacterial genome from occurring. Tetracyclines are bacteriostatic, which means that the growth of the bacterium will be slowed. Tetracyclines are not often recommended for the treatment of N. gonorrhoeae because the treatment regimen requires many doses, which may affect compliance and contribute to resistance. Tetracycline is still used as treatment for this infection in developing countries because the cost for the drug is low

As with the penicillin resistance, the penB (porin formation) and mtr (efflux pump formation) mutations mediate chromosomal resistance. These adaptations will also affect the ability of the antibiotic to get into, or stay in the bacterial cell. High level resistance of N. gonorrhoeae to tetracyclines was first reported in 1986 with the discovering of the tetM determinant. The mechanism of resistance is still unknown.

== Aminoglycosides ==
N. gonorrhoeae has also shown resistance to the aminoglycoside class of antibiotics. These antibiotics bind to the 16s rRNA of the 30S subunit of the bacterial ribosome, thereby inhibiting mRNA translation and protein synthesis. Resistance appears to be acquired through porin-related mechanisms, much like the cephalosporin resistance mechanism. This mechanism would result in the access of the antibiotic to the bacterial cell being inhibited. There is a possibility of future enzymes (made by the bacterium) that will be able to denature and inactivate the aminoglycosides.

== See also ==
- Neisseria gonorrhoeae
- Antibiotic resistance
