= Capnophile =

Microorganism that flourishes in a carbon dioxide rich environment

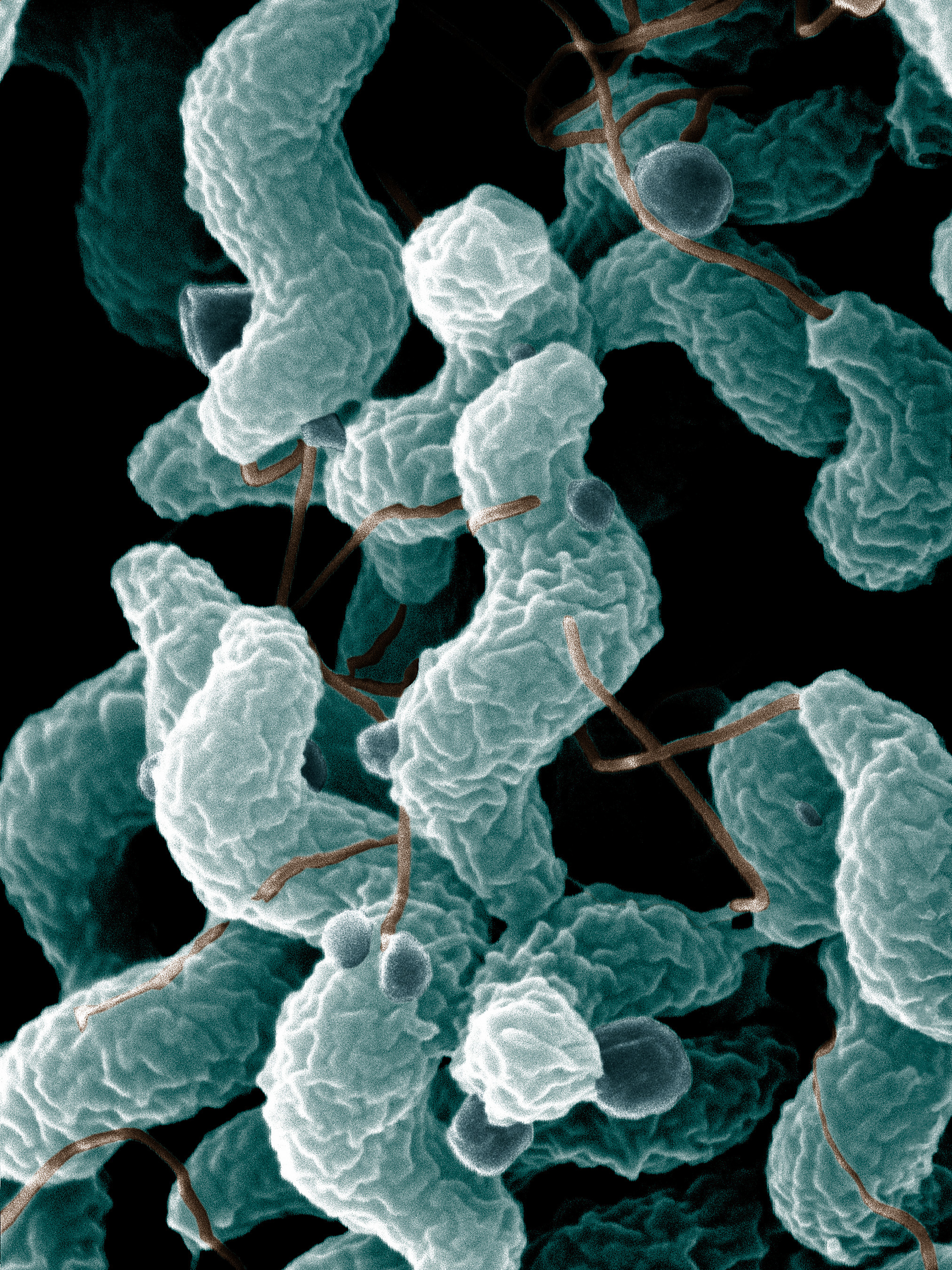
Campylobacter, a type of capnophile.

Capnophiles are microorganisms that thrive in the presence of high concentrations of carbon dioxide (CO_{2}).

Some capnophiles may have a metabolic requirement for carbon dioxide, while others merely compete more successfully for resources under these conditions. The term is a generally descriptive one and has less relevance as a means of establishing a taxonomic or evolutionary relationship among organisms with this characteristic.

For example, the ability of capnophiles to tolerate (or utilize) the amount of oxygen that is also in their environment may vary widely and may be far more critical to their survival. Species of Campylobacter are bacterial capnophiles that are more easily identified because they are also microaerophiles, organisms that can grow in high carbon dioxide as long as a small amount of free oxygen is present, but at a dramatically reduced concentration. (In the Earth's atmosphere carbon dioxide levels are approximately five hundred times lower than that of oxygen, 0.04% and 21% of the total, respectively.) Obligate anaerobes are microbes that will die in the presence of oxygen without respect to the concentration of carbon dioxide in their environment, and typically acquire energy through anaerobic respiration or fermentation.

In 2004, a capnophilic bacterium was characterized that appears to require carbon dioxide. This organism, Mannheimia succiniciproducens, has a unique metabolism involving carbon fixation. While carbon fixation is common to most plant life on earth since it is the key initial step in the biosynthesis of complex carbon compounds during photosynthesis (the Calvin cycle), it is found in relatively few microorganisms and not found in animals. M. succiniciproducens can attach carbon dioxide to the three-carbon backbone of phosphoenolpyruvate, an endproduct in glycolysis, to generate the four-carbon compound, oxaloacetic acid, an intermediate in the Krebs cycle. Although M. succiniciproducens has most of the intermediates in the Krebs cycle, it appears incapable of aerobic respiration, instead using fumarate as a final electron acceptor.

== Pathogenicity ==
There are currently at least two relatively well characterized capnophilic groups of microorganisms that include human pathogens. Campylobacter species can cause intestinal disorders. Other capnophilic pathogens occur in the Gram-negative Aggregatibacter spp. found in the mouth (e.g. Aggregatibacter actinomycetemcomitans). These are a cause of aggressive juvenile periodontitis.

However, capnophiles are also normal microbiota in some ruminants. M. succiniciproducens, in particular, was isolated from a bovine rumen. Its unusual biochemistry and benign characteristics have attracted commercial interest.
