= Thioglycolate broth =

Culture medium used in microbiology

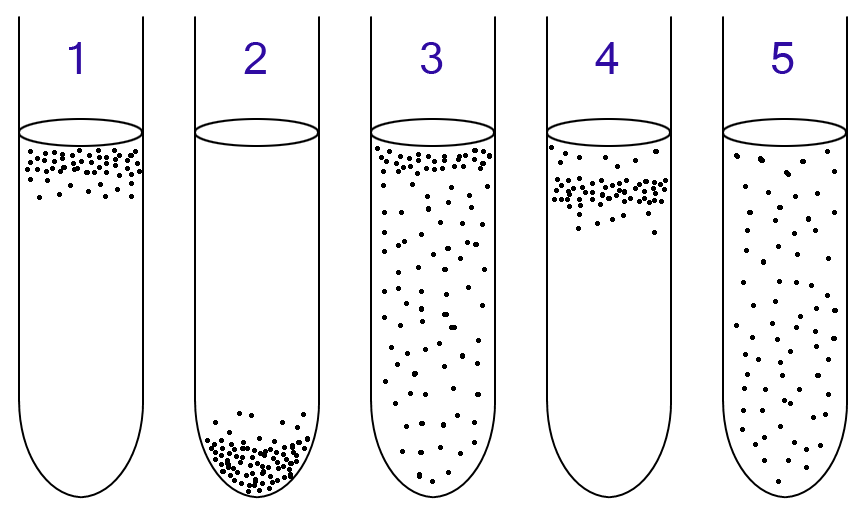
Aerobic and anaerobic bacteria can be identified by growing them in test tubes of thioglycolate broth: 1: Obligate aerobes need oxygen because they cannot ferment or respire anaerobically. They gather at the top of the tube where the oxygen concentration is highest. 2: Obligate anaerobes are poisoned by oxygen, so they gather at the bottom of the tube where the oxygen concentration is lowest. 3: Facultative anaerobes can grow with or without oxygen because they can metabolise energy aerobically or anaerobically. They gather mostly at the top because aerobic respiration generates more ATP than either fermentation or anaerobic respiration. 4: Microaerophiles need oxygen because they cannot ferment or respire anaerobically. However, they are poisoned by high concentrations of oxygen. They gather in the upper part of the test tube, but not the very top. 5: Aerotolerant organisms do not require oxygen as they metabolise energy anaerobically. Unlike obligate anaerobes, though, they are not poisoned by oxygen. They can be found evenly spread throughout the test tube.

Thioglycolate broth is a multipurpose, enrichment, differential medium used primarily to determine the oxygen requirements of microorganisms. Sodium thioglycolate in the medium consumes oxygen and permits the growth of obligate anaerobes. This, combined with the diffusion of oxygen from the top of the broth, produces a range of oxygen concentrations in the medium along its depth. The oxygen concentration at a given level is indicated by a redox-sensitive dye such as resazurin that turns pink in the presence of oxygen.

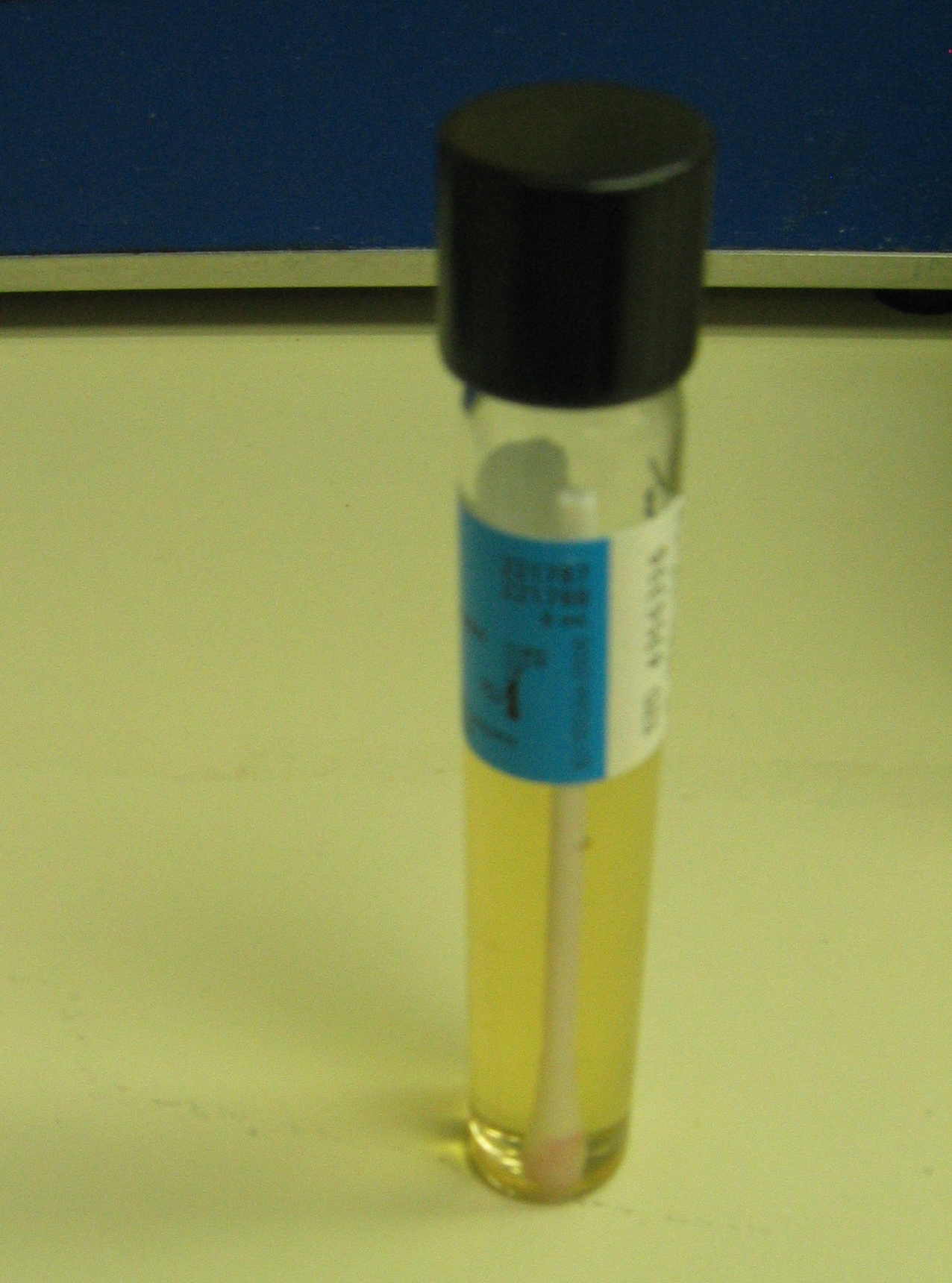
Thioglycollate broth medium is recommended to isolate strict anaerobes should an anaerobic infection be suspected.

This allows the differentiation of obligate aerobes, obligate anaerobes, facultative anaerobes, microaerophiles, and aerotolerant organisms. For example, obligately anaerobic Clostridium species will be seen growing only in the bottom of the test tube.

Thioglycolate broth is also used to recruit macrophages to the peritoneal cavity of mice when injected intraperitoneally. It recruits numerous macrophages, but does not activate them.
