= Aerotolerant anaerobe =

Microorganisms whose metabolism is not dependent on, and not poisoned by, oxygen

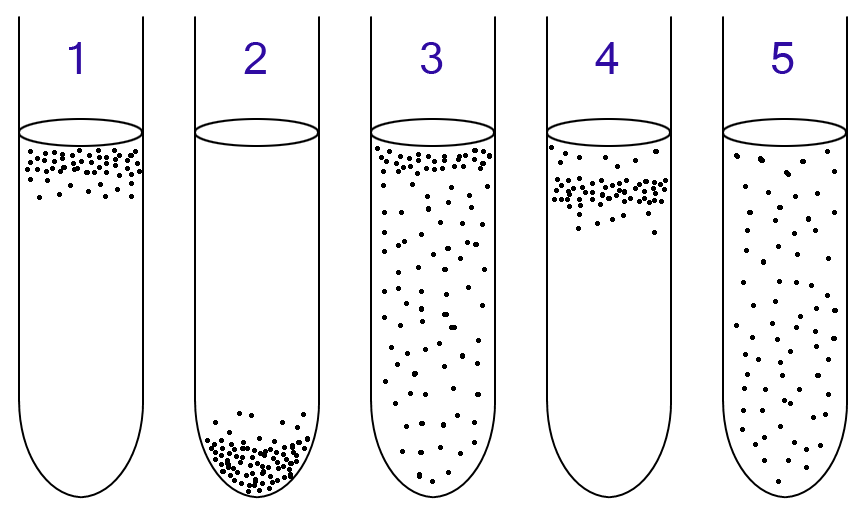
Anaerobic bacteria can be identified by growing them in test tubes of thioglycollate broth: 1: Obligate aerobes need oxygen because they cannot ferment or respire anaerobically. They gather at the top of the tube where the oxygen concentration is highest. 2: Obligate anaerobes are poisoned by oxygen, so they gather at the bottom of the tube where the oxygen concentration is lowest. 3: Facultative anaerobes can grow with or without oxygen because they can metabolise energy aerobically or anaerobically. They gather mostly at the top because aerobic respiration generates more ATP than either fermentation or anaerobic respiration. 4: Microaerophiles need oxygen because they cannot ferment or respire anaerobically. However, they are poisoned by high concentrations of oxygen. They gather in the upper part of the test tube but not the very top. 5: Aerotolerant organisms do not require oxygen as they metabolise energy anaerobically. Unlike obligate anaerobes however, they are not poisoned by oxygen. They can be found evenly spread throughout the test tube.

Aerotolerant anaerobes use fermentation to produce ATP. They do not use oxygen, but they can protect themselves from reactive oxygen molecules. In contrast, obligate anaerobes can be harmed by reactive oxygen molecules.

There are three categories of anaerobes. Where obligate aerobes require oxygen to grow, obligate anaerobes are damaged by oxygen, aerotolerant organisms cannot use oxygen but tolerate its presence, and facultative anaerobes use oxygen if it is present but can grow without it.

Most aerotolerant anaerobes have superoxide dismutase and (non-catalase) peroxidase but do not have catalase. More specifically, they may use a NADH oxidase/NADH peroxidase (NOX/NPR) system or a glutathione peroxidase system. An example of an aerotolerant anaerobe is Cutibacterium acnes.
