= Obligate anaerobe =

Microorganism killed by normal atmospheric levels of oxygen

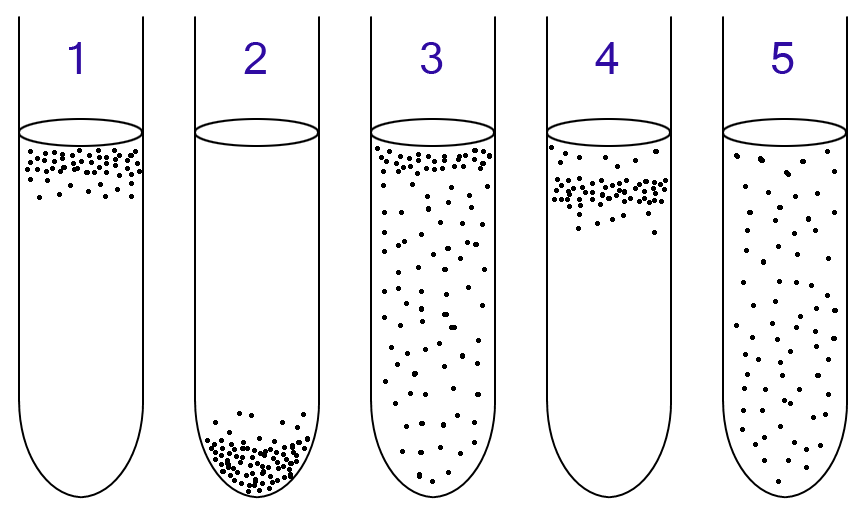
Aerobic and anaerobic bacteria can be identified by growing them in test tubes of thioglycollate broth: 1: Obligate aerobes need oxygen because they cannot ferment or respire anaerobically. They gather at the top of the tube where the oxygen concentration is highest. 2: Obligate anaerobes are poisoned by oxygen, so they gather at the bottom of the tube where the oxygen concentration is lowest. 3: Facultative anaerobes can grow with or without oxygen because they can metabolise energy aerobically or anaerobically. They gather mostly at the top because aerobic respiration generates more ATP than either fermentation or anaerobic respiration. 4: Microaerophiles need oxygen because they cannot ferment or respire anaerobically. However, they are poisoned by high concentrations of oxygen. They gather in the upper part of the test tube but not the very top. 5: Aerotolerant organisms do not require oxygen and cannot utilise it even if present; they metabolise energy anaerobically. Unlike obligate anaerobes, however, they are not poisoned by oxygen. They can be found evenly spread throughout the test tube. Both facultative anaerobes and aerotolerant organisms will undergo fermentation in the absence of oxygen, but the facultative anaerobes will switch to aerobic metabolism when oxygen is present (a phenomenon known as the Pasteur effect). The Pasteur effect is sometimes used to distinguish between facultative anaerobes and aerotolerant organisms, in the lab.

Obligate anaerobes are microorganisms killed by normal atmospheric concentrations of oxygen (20.95% O_{2}). Oxygen tolerance varies between species, with some species capable of surviving in up to 8% oxygen, while others lose viability in environments with an oxygen concentration greater than 0.5%.

Obligate anaerobes, which die when normal amounts of oxygen are present, are contrasted with obligate aerobes, which die without oxygen. Bacteria that fall in between these two extremes may be classified as either facultative anaerobes, which can use oxygen but also survive without it, or microaerophiles, which need lower levels of oxygen. Aerotolerant organisms are indifferent to the presence or absence of oxygen.

== Oxygen sensitivity ==
The oxygen sensitivity of obligate anaerobes has been attributed to a combination of factors including oxidative stress and enzyme production. Oxygen can also damage obligate anaerobes in ways not involving oxidative stress.

Because molecular oxygen contains two unpaired electrons in the highest occupied molecular orbital, it is readily reduced to superoxide (O^{−}_{2}) and hydrogen peroxide (H_{2}O_{2}) within cells. A reaction between these two products results in the formation of a free hydroxyl radical (OH^{.}). Superoxide, hydrogen peroxide, and hydroxyl radicals are a class of compounds known as reactive oxygen species (ROS), highly reactant products that are damaging to microbes, including obligate anaerobes. Aerobic organisms produce superoxide dismutase and catalase to detoxify these products, but obligate anaerobes produce these enzymes in very small quantities, or not at all. The variability in oxygen tolerance of obligate anaerobes (<0.5 to 8% O_{2}) is thought to reflect the quantity of superoxide dismutase and catalase being produced.

In 1986, Carlioz and Touati performed experiments which support the idea that reactive oxygen species may be toxic to anaerobes. E. coli, a facultative anaerobe, was mutated by a deletion of superoxide dismutase genes. In the presence of oxygen, this mutation resulted in the inability to properly synthesize certain amino acids or use common carbon sources as substrates during metabolism. In the absence of oxygen, the mutated samples grew normally. In 2018, Lu et al. found that in Bacteroides thetaiotaomicron, an obligate anaerobe found in the mammalian digestive tract, exposure to oxygen results in increased levels of superoxide which inactivated important metabolic enzymes.

Dissolved oxygen increases the redox potential of a solution, and high redox potential inhibits the growth of some obligate anaerobes. For example, methanogens grow at a redox potential lower than -0.3 V. Sulfide is an essential component of some enzymes, and molecular oxygen oxidizes this to form disulfide, thus inactivating certain enzymes (e.g. nitrogenase). Organisms may not be able to grow with these essential enzymes deactivated. Growth may also be inhibited due to a lack of reducing equivalents for biosynthesis because electrons are exhausted in reducing oxygen.

== Energy metabolism ==
Obligate anaerobes convert nutrients into energy through anaerobic respiration or fermentation. In aerobic respiration, the pyruvate generated from glycolysis is converted to acetyl-CoA. This is then broken down via the TCA cycle and electron transport chain. Anaerobic respiration differs from aerobic respiration in that it uses an electron acceptor other than oxygen in the electron transport chain. Examples of alternative electron acceptors include sulfate, nitrate, iron, manganese, mercury, and carbon monoxide.

Fermentation differs from anaerobic respiration in that the pyruvate generated from glycolysis is broken down without the involvement of an electron transport chain (i.e. there is no oxidative phosphorylation). Numerous fermentation pathways exist such as lactic acid fermentation, mixed acid fermentation, 2-3 butanediol fermentation where organic compounds are reduced to organic acids and alcohol.

The energy yield of anaerobic respiration and fermentation (i.e. the number of ATP molecules generated) is less than in aerobic respiration. This is why facultative anaerobes, which can metabolise energy both aerobically and anaerobically, preferentially metabolise energy aerobically. This is observable when facultative anaerobes are cultured in thioglycolate broth.

== Ecology and examples ==
Obligate anaerobes are found in oxygen-free environments such as the intestinal tracts of animals, the deep ocean, still waters, landfills, in deep sediments of soil. Examples of obligatorily anaerobic bacterial genera include Actinomyces, Bacteroides, Clostridium, Fusobacterium, Peptostreptococcus, Porphyromonas, Prevotella, Propionibacterium, and Veillonella. Clostridium species are endospore-forming bacteria, and can survive in atmospheric concentrations of oxygen in this dormant form. The remaining bacteria listed do not form endospores.

Several species of the Mycobacterium, Streptomyces, and Rhodococcus genera are examples of obligate anaerobe found in soil. Obligate anaerobes are also found in the digestive tracts of humans and other animals as well as in the first stomach of ruminants.

Examples of obligately anaerobic fungal genera include the rumen fungi Neocallimastix, Piromonas, and Sphaeromonas.

== See also ==
- Aerobic respiration
- Fermentation
