= Obligate aerobe =

Organism that requires oxygen to grow

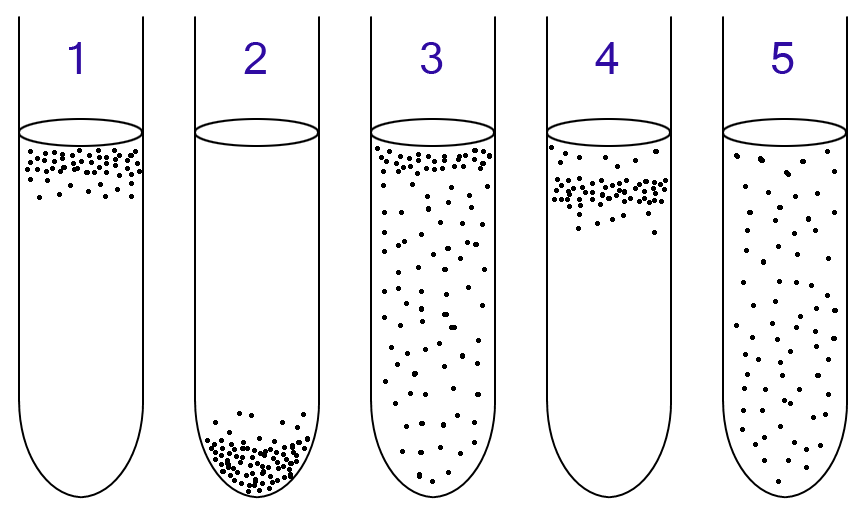
Aerobic and anaerobic bacteria can be identified by growing them in test tubes of thioglycollate broth: 1: Obligate aerobes need oxygen because they cannot ferment or respire anaerobically. They gather at the top of the tube where the oxygen concentration is highest. 2: Obligate anaerobes are poisoned by oxygen, so they gather at the bottom of the tube where the oxygen concentration is lowest. 3: Facultative anaerobes can grow with or without oxygen because they can metabolise energy aerobically or anaerobically. They gather mostly at the top because aerobic respiration generates more ATP than either fermentation or anaerobic respiration. 4: Microaerophiles need oxygen because they cannot ferment or respire anaerobically. However, they are poisoned by high concentrations of oxygen. They gather in the upper part of the test tube but not the very top. 5: Aerotolerant organisms do not require oxygen as they metabolise energy anaerobically. Unlike obligate anaerobes however, they are not poisoned by oxygen. They can be found evenly spread throughout the test tube.

An obligate aerobe is an organism that requires oxygen to grow. Through cellular respiration, these organisms use oxygen to metabolise substances, like sugars or fats, to obtain energy. In this type of respiration, oxygen serves as the terminal electron acceptor for the electron transport chain. Aerobic respiration has the advantage of yielding more energy (adenosine triphosphate or ATP) than fermentation or anaerobic respiration, but obligate aerobes are subject to high levels of oxidative stress.

Table 1. Terms used to describe O_{2} Relations of Microorganisms.
Group	Environment		O_{2} Effect
Group	Aerobic	Anaerobic	O_{2} Effect
Obligate Aerobe	Growth	No growth	Required (used for aerobic respiration)
Obligate Anaerobe	No growth	Growth	Toxic
Facultative Anaerobe (Facultative Aerobe)	Growth	Growth	Not required for growth but used when available
Microaerophile	Growth if level is not too high	No growth	Required but at levels below 0.2 atm
Aerotolerant Anaerobe	Growth	Growth	Not required and not used

== Examples ==
Among organisms, almost all animals, most fungi, and several bacteria are obligate aerobes. Examples of obligately aerobic bacteria include Mycobacterium tuberculosis (acid-fast), Bacillus (Gram-positive), and Nocardia asteroides (Gram-positive). With the exception of the yeasts, most fungi are obligate aerobes. Also, almost all algae are obligate aerobes.

A unique obligate aerobe is Streptomyces coelicolor which is gram-positive, soil-dwelling, and belongs to the phylum Actinomycetota. It is unique because the genome of this obligate aerobe encodes numerous enzymes with functions that are usually attributed to anaerobic metabolism in facultatively and strictly anaerobic bacteria.

== Survival strategies ==
When obligate aerobes are in a temporarily oxygen-deprived environment, they need survival strategies to avoid death. Under these conditions, Mycobacterium smegmatis can quickly switch between fermentative hydrogen production and hydrogen oxidation with either oxygen or fumarate reduction depending on the availability of electron acceptor. This example is the first time that hydrogen production has been seen in an obligate aerobe. It also confirms the fermentation in a mycobacterium and is evidence that hydrogen plays a role in survival as well as growth.

Problems can also arise in oxygen-rich environments, most commonly attributed to oxidative stress. This occurrence is when there is an imbalance of free radicals and antioxidants in the cells of the organism, largely due to pollution and radiation in the environment. Obligate aerobes survive this phenomenon by using the organism's immune system to correct the imbalance.

== See also ==
- Aerobic respiration
- Anaerobic respiration
- Fermentation
- Obligate anaerobe
- Facultative anaerobe
- Microaerophile
