= Microaerophile =

Microorganism requiring lower levels of oxygen than normally found in atmosphere

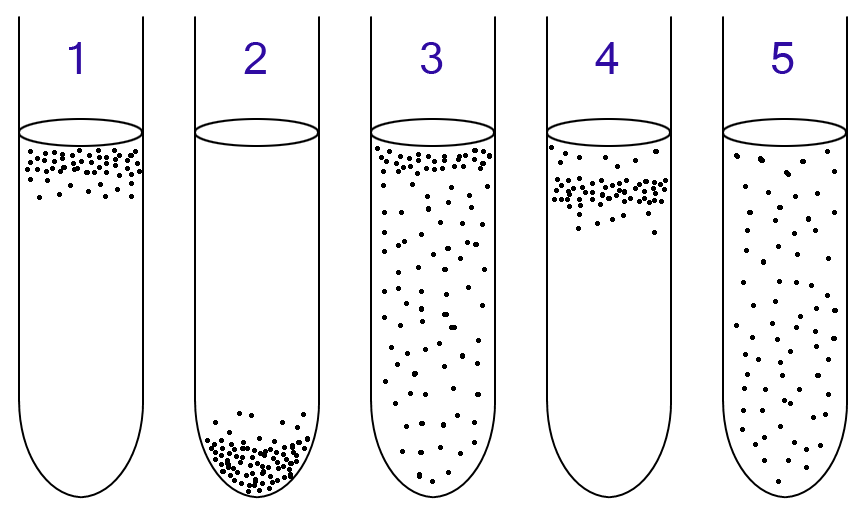
Anaerobic bacteria can be identified by growing them in test tubes of thioglycollate broth: 1: Obligate aerobes need oxygen because they cannot ferment or respire anaerobically. They gather at the top of the tube where the oxygen concentration is highest. 2: Obligate anaerobes are poisoned by oxygen, so they gather at the bottom of the tube where the oxygen concentration is lowest. 3: Facultative anaerobes can grow with or without oxygen because they can metabolise energy aerobically or anaerobically. They gather mostly at the top because aerobic respiration generates more ATP than either fermentation or anaerobic respiration. 4: Microaerophiles need oxygen because they cannot ferment or respire anaerobically. However, they are poisoned by high concentrations of oxygen. They gather in the upper part of the test tube but not the very top. 5: Aerotolerant organisms do not require oxygen as they metabolise energy anaerobically. Unlike obligate anaerobes however, they are not poisoned by oxygen. They can be found evenly spread throughout the test tube.

A microaerophile is a microorganism that requires environments containing lower levels of dioxygen than those present in the atmosphere (i.e. < 21% O_{2}; typically 2–10% O_{2}) for optimal growth. A more restrictive interpretation requires the microorganism to be obligate in this requirement. Many microaerophiles are also capnophiles, requiring an elevated concentration of carbon dioxide (e.g. 10% CO_{2} in the case of Campylobacter species).

The original definition of a microaerophile has been criticized for being too restrictive and not accurate enough compared to similar categories. The broader term microaerobe has been coined to describe microbes able to respire oxygen "within microoxic environments by using high-affinity terminal oxidase".

== Culture ==
Microaerophiles are traditionally cultivated in candle jars. Candle jars are containers into which a lit candle is introduced before sealing the container's airtight lid. The candle's flame burns until extinguished by oxygen deprivation, creating a carbon dioxide-rich, oxygen-poor atmosphere.

Newer oxystat bioreactor methods allow for more precise control of gas levels in the microaerobic environment, using a probe to measure the oxygen concentration or redox potential in real time. Ways to control oxygen intake include gas-generating packs and gas exchange.

As oxystat bioreactors are expensive to buy and run, lower-cost solutions have been devised. For example, the Micro-Oxygenated Culture Device (MOCD) is a system involving ordinary flasks, oxygen-permeable tubes, sensors, and water pumps. Aeration is done by pumping the culture medium through the tubes.

== Examples ==
A wide variety of microaerobic conditions exist in the world: in human bodies, underwater, etc. Many bacteria from these sources are microaerobes, some of which are also microaerophiles.

- Some members of Campylobacterales are microaerophilic:
  - Campylobacter species are microaerophilic.
  - Helicobacter pylori (previously identified as a Campylobacter), a species of Campylobacterota that has been linked to peptic ulcers and some types of gastritis
- Many members of Lactobacillus sensu lato (see Lactobacillaceae) are microaerophiles. As facultative anaerobes, they do survive anaerobic conditions, but grow better with a little oxygen.
- Magnetospirillum gryphiswaldense and Magnetospira sp. QH-2 are aquatic microaerophilic magnetotactic bacteria. The formation of magnetite in such bacteria in general require microaerobic conditions.

== See also ==
- Aerobic respiration
- Anaerobic respiration
- Facultative anaerobe
- Fermentation
- Obligate aerobe
- Obligate anaerobe
- Oxygenation (environmental)
