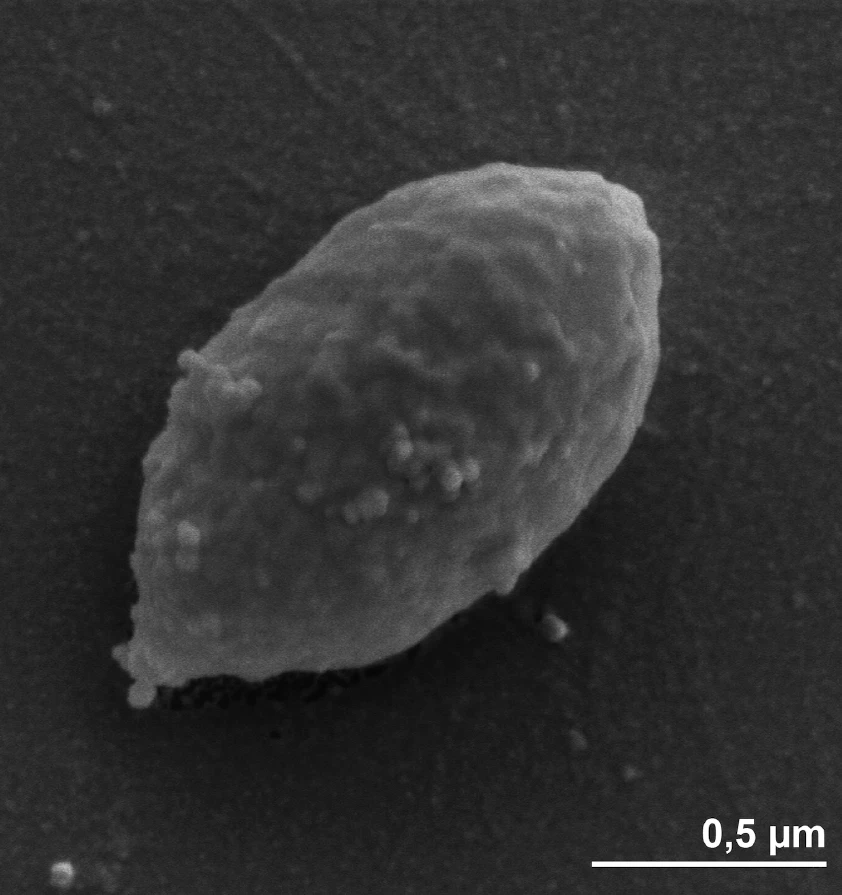
- Desulfobulbus propionicus type strain 1pr3T

Scientific classification
- Domain: Bacteria
- Kingdom: Pseudomonadati
- Phylum: Thermodesulfobacteriota
- Class: Desulfobulbia
- Order: Desulfobulbales
- Family: Desulfobulbaceae
- Genus: Desulfobulbus
- Species: D. propionicus

Binomial name
- Desulfobulbus propionicus Pagani et al. 2011

Type strain
- 1pr3^{T} (DSM 2032, ATCC 33891, VKM B-1956)

= Desulfobulbus propionicus =

Species of bacterium

Desulfobulbus propionicus is a Gram-negative, anaerobic chemoorganotroph. Three separate strains have been identified: 1pr3^{T}, 2pr4, and 3pr10. It is also the first pure culture example of successful disproportionation of elemental sulfur to sulfate and sulfide. Desulfobulbus propionicus has the potential to produce free energy (in the form of electrons) and chemical products.

== Discovery ==
Desulfobulbus propionicus was discovered in 1982 by Friedrich Widdel and Norbert Pfenning. Desulfobulbus propionicus was isolated from samples taken from anaerobic mud in a village ditch, pond, and marine mud flat in Germany. All three strains were isolated using the agar shake dilution method on a basal medium with added sulfate, mineral salts, iron, trace elements, bicarbonate, sulfide, and seven vitamins.

Strain	Geographical Location	Habitat Type
1pr3^{T}	Lindhort, Germany	Freshwater ditch mud
2pr4	Hannover, Germany	Freshwater pond mud
3pr10	Jadebusen, Germany (North Sea)	Marine mud flat

== Etymology ==
The genus Desulfobulbus can be derived from the Latin words -de meaning from, -sulfo meaning sulfur, and -bulbus meaning onion shaped literally meaning onion-shaped sulfate reducer. The species name propionicus is derived from the organisms electron donor propionate.

== Taxonomic and phylogenetic description ==
Desulfobulbus propionicus possesses three strains: 1pr3^{T}, 2pr4, and 3pr10. Similarly, all three strains are Gram-negative, sulfur-reducers with the ability to grow exclusively on lactate or pyruvate without any external electron or carbon sources. What separates 1pr3^{T} from its sister strains is its ability to reduce sulfite and thiosulfate to hydrogen sulfide (H_{2}S); reduce nitrate to ammonia; lastly, its presence of cytochrome types b- and c-. Furthermore, strain 1pr3^{T} differentiated from the others in shape (1pr3^{T} possesses pointed ends compared to ovoid or ellipsoidal shaped ends), motility (1pr3^{T} lacks motility, whereas the others possess flagella), and the presence of fimbriae (2pr4 and 3pr10 strains do not).

In terms of the genus Desulfobulbus, the closest relatives of D. propionicus are D. elongatus with an identity of 96.9%, followed by D. rhabdoformis, and then D. mediterraneus and D. japonicas with equal relation respective to the phylogenetic tree constructed using 16S rRNA sequences.

== Characterization ==
=== Morphology ===
Desulfobulbus propionicus is a Gram-negative, ellipsoidal to lemon-shaped bacteria, with an average length of 1.0 to 1.3μm and a width of 1.8 to 2.0μm. D. propionicus functions as an anaerobic chemoorganotroph. The three strains differ in shape, motility, and presence of fimbriae.

Strain	Shape	Motility	Fimbriae
1pr3^{T}	Lemon-shaped	Non-motile	+
2pr4	Ovoid	Single polar flagella	-
3pr10	Ellipsoidal	Single polar flagella	-

=== Metabolism ===
Desulfobulbus propionicus is an anaerobic chemoorganotroph. D. propionicus uses the methylmalony-CoA pathway to ferment 3 moles of pyruvate to 2 moles of acetate and 1 mole of propionate. Desulfobulbus propionicus utilizes propionate, lactate, pyruvate, and alcohols from the environment as not only electron sources, but for carbon sources as well. Hydrogen gas (H_{2}) is only utilized as an electron donor in the presence of carbon dioxide and acetate. As assumed by its name, Desulfobulbus propionicus reduces sulfate, sulfite, and thiosulfate to hydrogen sulfide (H_{2}S), but does not reduce elemental sulfur, malate, and fumarate. When sulfate is absent ethanol is fermented to propionate and acetate. In the absence of an electron acceptor, D. propionicus produces sulfate and sulfide from elemental sulfur and water. Also, Desulfobulbus propionicus strains 1pr3^{T} and 3pr10 can only grow in defined minimal media with the addition of a vitamin 4-aminobenzoic acid, whereas strain 2pr4 does not show this additional requirement. Furthermore, the 2pr4 strain is the only of the three to show growth with butyrate as an electron donor and carbon source, however, the growth is slow compared to other substrates.

=== Genome ===
Of the three strains within Desulfobulbus propionicus, 1pr3^{T} is the only to have its genome completely sequenced. It was sequenced in 2011 by Pagani et al. Strain 1pr3^{T} was found to encompass a genome size of 3,851,869 bp, with a G-C content of 58.93%. Pagani et al. predicted 3,408 genes in the genome of 1pr3^{T}, with 3,351 genes that encode proteins. The genome contains 57 RNA genes and two rRNA operons. Furthermore, there is 68 pseudo genes which makes up 2.0% of the total genome size.

=== Ecology ===
Desulfobulbus propionicus inhabits anaerobic freshwaters and marine sediments. Among the three strains, they differ in: temperature ranges, optimal temperature, pH range, optimal pH, and NaCl concentration requirements (1pr3^{T} and 2pr4 show slowed growth above a NaCl concentration of 15 g/L, and 3pr10 shows no growth below 15 g/L).

Strain	Temperate Range (°C)	Temperature Optimum (°C)	pH Range	pH Optimum	NaCl Concentration Requirement (g/L)
1pr3^{T}	10 - 43	39	6.0 - 8.6	7.2	<15
2pr4	10 - 36	30	6.6 - 8.1	7.2	<15
3pr10	15 - 36	29	6.6 - 8.1	7.4	>15

== Application ==
Desulfobulbus propionicus can serve as a biocatalyst in microbial electrosynthesis. Microbial electrosynthesis is the usage of electrons by microorganism to reduce carbon dioxide to organic molecules. Desulfobulbus propionicus, when present at the anode, oxidizes elemental sulfur to sulfate, which creates free electrons in the process. The free electrons flow to the organism located at the cathode. The microbe present at the cathode utilizes the electron energy transferred from Desulfobulbus propionicus to create organic matter (e.g. acetate) by reducing carbon dioxide. The use of microbial electrosynthesis has potential to aid in the production and waste maintenance of industrial chemicals and energy production.
