= Oxidizing agent =

Chemical compound used to oxidize another substance in a chemical reaction

The international pictogram for oxidizing chemicals.

Dangerous goods label for oxidizing agents

An oxidizing agent (also known as an oxidant, oxidizer, electron recipient, or electron acceptor) is a substance in a redox chemical reaction that gains or "accepts"/"receives" an electron from a reducing agent (called the reductant, reducer, or electron donor). In other words, an oxidizer is any substance that oxidizes another substance. The oxidation state, which describes the degree of loss of electrons, of the oxidizer decreases while that of the reductant increases; this is expressed by saying that oxidizers "undergo reduction" and "are reduced" while reducers "undergo oxidation" and "are oxidized". Common oxidizing agents are oxygen, hydrogen peroxide, and the halogens.

In one sense, an oxidizing agent is a chemical species that undergoes a chemical reaction in which it gains one or more electrons. In that sense, it is one component in an oxidation–reduction (redox) reaction. In the second sense, an oxidizing agent is a chemical species that transfers electronegative atoms, usually oxygen, to a substrate. Combustion, many explosives, and organic redox reactions involve atom-transfer reactions.

== Electron acceptors ==
Example of a reduction–oxidation reaction between sodium and chlorine, with the OIL RIG mnemonic

Tetracyanoquinodimethane is an organic electron-acceptor.

Electron acceptors participate in electron-transfer reactions. In this context, the oxidizing agent is called an electron acceptor and the reducing agent is called an electron donor. A classic oxidizing agent is the ferrocenium ion Fe(C_{5}H_{5})_{2}^{+}, which accepts an electron to form Fe(C_{5}H_{5})_{2}. One of the strongest acceptors commercially available is "magic blue", the radical cation derived from N(C_{6}H_{4}−_{4}−Br)_{3}.

For extensive tabulations of ranking the electron accepting properties of various reagents (redox potentials), see Standard electrode potential (data page).

== Atom-transfer reagents ==
In more common usage, an oxidizing agent transfers oxygen atoms to a substrate. In this context, the oxidizing agent can be called an oxygenation reagent or oxygen-atom transfer (OAT) agent. Examples include MnO_{4}^{−} (permanganate), CrO_{4}^{2−} (chromate), OsO_{4} (osmium tetroxide), and especially ClO_{4}^{−} (perchlorate). Notice that these species are all oxides.

In some cases, these oxides can also serve as electron acceptors, as illustrated by the conversion of MnO_{4}^{−} to MnO_{4}^{2−}, ie permanganate to manganate.

=== Common oxidizing agents ===
- Oxygen (O_{2})
- Ozone (O_{3})
- Hydrogen peroxide (H_{2}O_{2}) and other inorganic peroxides, Fenton's reagent
- Fluorine (F_{2}), chlorine (Cl_{2}), and other halogens
- Nitric acid (HNO_{3}) and nitrate compounds such as potassium nitrate (KNO_{3}), the oxidizer in black powder
- Potassium chlorate (KClO_{3})
- Xenon difluoride (XeF_{2})
- Xenon tetrafluoride (XeF_{4})
- Xenon hexafluoride (XeF_{6})
- Krypton difluoride (KrF_{2})
- Sulfur (S_{8})
- Peroxydisulfuric acid (H_{2}S_{2}O_{8})
- Peroxymonosulfuric acid (H_{2}SO_{5})
- Hypochlorite, chlorite, chlorate, perchlorate, and other analogous halogen oxyanions
- Fluorides of chlorine, bromine, and iodine
- Hexavalent chromium compounds such as chromic and dichromic acids and chromium trioxide, pyridinium chlorochromate (PCC), and chromate/dichromate compounds such as Sodium dichromate (Na_{2}Cr_{2}O_{7})
- Permanganate compounds such as potassium permanganate (KMnO_{4})
- Sodium perborate ((Na^{+})_{2}·B_{2}O_{4}(OH)_{4}^{2−})
- Nitrous oxide (N_{2}O), Nitrogen dioxide/Dinitrogen tetroxide (NO_{2} / N_{2}O_{4})
- Sodium bismuthate (NaBiO_{3})
- Cerium (IV) compounds such as ceric ammonium nitrate and ceric sulfate
- Lead dioxide (PbO_{2})

== Dangerous materials definition ==
The dangerous goods definition of an oxidizing agent is a substance that can cause or contribute to the combustion of other material. By this definition some materials that are classified as oxidizing agents by analytical chemists are not classified as oxidizing agents in a dangerous materials sense. An example is potassium dichromate, which does not pass the dangerous goods test of an oxidizing agent.

The U.S. Department of Transportation defines oxidizing agents specifically. There are two definitions for oxidizing agents governed under DOT regulations. These two are Class 5; Division 5.1(a)1 and Class 5; Division 5.1(a)2. Division 5.1 "means a material that may, generally by yielding oxygen, cause or enhance the combustion of other materials." Division 5.(a)1 of the DOT code applies to solid oxidizers "if, when tested in accordance with the UN Manual of Tests and Criteria (IBR, see § 171.7 of this subchapter), its mean burning time is less than or equal to the burning time of a 3:7 potassium bromate/cellulose mixture." 5.1(a)2 of the DOT code applies to liquid oxidizers "if, when tested in accordance with the UN Manual of Tests and Criteria, it spontaneously ignites or its mean time for a pressure rise from 690 kPa to 2070 kPa gauge is less than the time of a 1:1 nitric acid (65 percent)/cellulose mixture."

== Common oxidizing agents and their products ==
Agent	Product(s)
O_{2} oxygen	Various, including the oxides H_{2}O and CO_{2}
O_{3} ozone	Various, including ketones, aldehydes, and H_{2}O; see ozonolysis
F_{2} fluorine	F^{−}
Cl_{2} chlorine	Cl^{−}
Br_{2} bromine	Br^{−}
I_{2} iodine	I^{−}, I_{3}^{−}
ClO^{−} hypochlorite	Cl^{−}, H_{2}O
ClO_{3}^{−} chlorate	Cl^{−}, H_{2}O
HNO_{3} nitric acid	NO nitric oxide (dilute nitric acid); NO_{2} nitrogen dioxide (concentrated nitric acid)
H_{2}SO_{4}(l) concentrated sulfuric acid SO_{3} sulfur trioxide	SO_{2} sulfur dioxide (non-aqueous) H_{2}SO_{3} sulfurous acid (In aqueous solution)
SO_{2} sulfur dioxide	S sulfur (Claus process, ultramarine production, more commonly reducing agent)
Hexavalent chromium CrO_{3} chromium trioxide CrO_{4}^{2−} chromate Cr_{2}O_{7}^{2−} dichromate	Cr^{3+}, H_{2}O
MnO_{4}^{−} permanganate MnO_{4}^{2−} manganate	Mn^{2+} (acidic) or MnO_{2} (basic)
Ag^{+} silver ion	Ag (metal)
SbF_{5} antimony pentafluoride	SbF_{6}^{−} hexafluoroantimonate or SbF_{3} antimony trifluoride
PtF_{6} platinum hexafluoride	PtF_{6}^{−} hexafluoroplatinate
RuO_{4} ruthenium tetroxide OsO_{4} osmium tetroxide	in organic lab scale synthesis
H_{2}O_{2}, other peroxides	Various, including oxides and H_{2}O
Tl(III) thallic compounds	Tl(I) thallous compounds, in organic lab scale synthesis

== See also ==
- Combustion – Chemical reaction between a fuel and oxygen
- Electron acceptor – Chemical entity capable of accepting electrons
- Electron donor – Chemical entity capable of donating electrons to another entity
- Electrosynthesis – Synthesis of chemical compounds in an electrochemical cell
- Organic oxidation – Redox reaction that takes place with organic compounds
- Organic redox reaction – Redox reaction that takes place with organic compounds
- Reducing agent – Chemical species that donates an electron to another species in a redox reaction
- Solvated electron – Free electron in a solution, often liquid ammonia
