= Desulfocapsa sulfexigens =

Scientific classification
- Domain: Bacteria
- Kingdom: Pseudomonadati
- Phylum: Thermodesulfobacteriota
- Class: Desulfobulbia
- Order: Desulfobulbales
- Family: Desulfocapsaceae
- Genus: Desulfocapsa
- Species: D. sulfexigens

Binomial name
- Desulfocapsa sulfexigens Finster et al. 1998

Species of bacterium

Desulfocapsa sulfexigens is a mesophilic, anaerobic, gram-negative bacterium. It disproportionates elemental sulfur and thiosulfate. SB164P1 is its type strain.
