= Desulfocapsa thiozymogenes =

Scientific classification
- Domain: Bacteria
- Kingdom: Pseudomonadati
- Phylum: Thermodesulfobacteriota
- Class: Desulfobulbia
- Order: Desulfobulbales
- Family: Desulfocapsaceae
- Genus: Desulfocapsa
- Species: D. thiozymogenes

Binomial name
- Desulfocapsa thiozymogenes Janssen et al. 1997

Species of bacterium

Desulfocapsa thiozymogenes is an anaerobic, gram-negative bacterium. It disproportionates elemental sulfur. It is the type species of its genus.
