= Desulforhopalus vacuolatus =

Scientific classification
- Domain: Bacteria
- Kingdom: Pseudomonadati
- Phylum: Thermodesulfobacteriota
- Class: Desulfobulbia
- Order: Desulfobulbales
- Family: Desulfocapsaceae
- Genus: Desulforhopalus
- Species: D. vacuolatus

Binomial name
- Desulforhopalus vacuolatus Isaksen and Teske 1999

Type strain
- ATCC 700480, DSM 9700, ltk 10

Species of bacterium

Desulforhopalus vacuolatus is a moderately psychrophilic and sulfate-reducing bacterium from the genus of Desulforhopalus which has been isolated from marine sediments from Kysing Fjord in Denmark.
