= Desulforhopalus singaporensis =

Scientific classification
- Domain: Bacteria
- Kingdom: Pseudomonadati
- Phylum: Thermodesulfobacteriota
- Class: Desulfobulbia
- Order: Desulfobulbales
- Family: Desulfocapsaceae
- Genus: Desulforhopalus
- Species: D. singaporensis

Binomial name
- Desulforhopalus singaporensis Lie et al. 2000

Type strain
- DSM 12130, S'pore T1

Species of bacterium

Desulforhopalus singaporensis is a bacterium from the genus of Desulforhopalus which has been isolated from sulfidic mud from Singapore.
