= Desulforhopalus =

Scientific classification
- Domain: Bacteria
- Kingdom: Pseudomonadati
- Phylum: Thermodesulfobacteriota
- Class: Desulfobulbia
- Order: Desulfobulbales
- Family: Desulfocapsaceae
- Genus: Desulforhopalus; Isaksen & Teske 1999

Type species
- Desulforhopalus vacuolatus Isaksen & Teske 1999

Species
- D. singaporensis; D. vacuolatus

Genus of bacteria

Desulforhopalus is a Gram-negative, strictly anaerobic, and non-motile genus of bacteria from the family Desulfobulbaceae.

== Phylogeny ==
The currently accepted taxonomy is based on the List of Prokaryotic names with Standing in Nomenclature (LPSN) and National Center for Biotechnology Information (NCBI).

16S rRNA based LTP_10_2024

- Desulforhopalus
  - D. singaporensis
  - D. vacuolatus

120 marker proteins based GTDB 10-RS226

- Desulforhopalus
  - D. singaporensis Lie et al. 2000
  - D. vacuolatus Isaksen & Teske 1999
