= Microbial oxidation of sulfur =

Means by which some organisms create energy

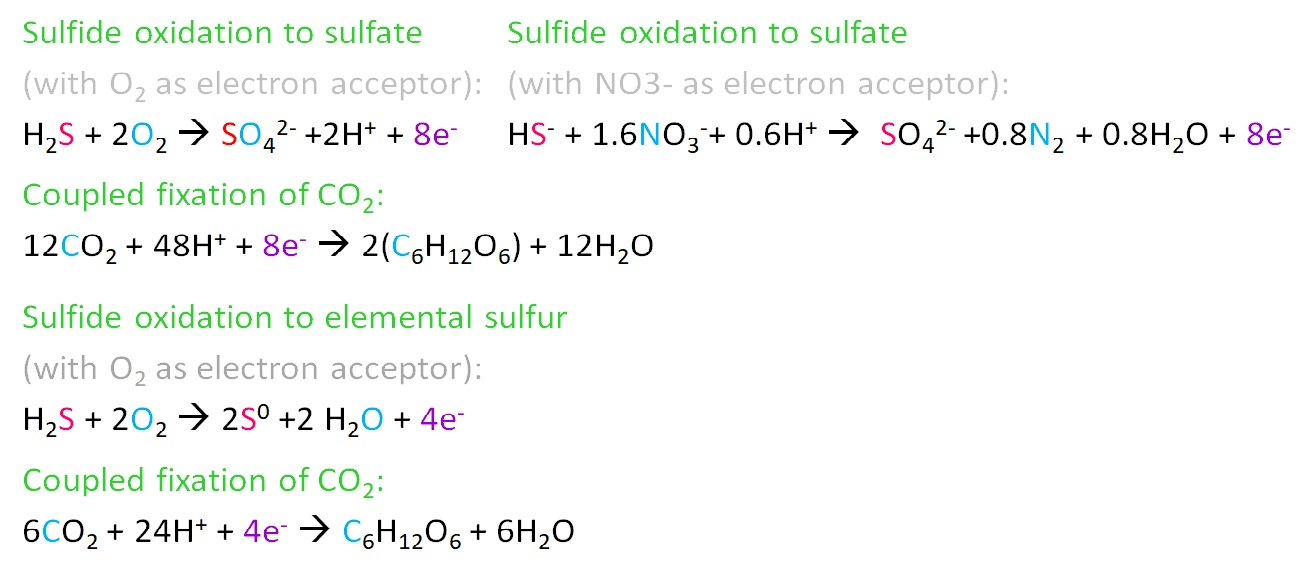
Reactions of oxidation of sulfide to sulfate and elemental sulfur (incorrectly balanced). The electrons (e^{−}) liberated from these oxidation reactions, which release chemical energy, are then used to fix carbon into organic molecules. The elements that become oxidized are shown in pink, those that become reduced in blue, and the electrons in purple.

Microbial oxidation of sulfur refers to the process by which microorganisms oxidize reduced sulfur compounds to obtain energy, often supporting autotrophic carbon fixation. This process is primarily carried out by chemolithoautotrophic sulfur-oxidizing prokaryotes, which use compounds such as hydrogen sulfide (H_{2}S), elemental sulfur (S^{0}), thiosulfate (S_{2}O_{3}^{2−}), and sulfite (SO_{3}^{2−}) as electron donors. The oxidation of these substrates is typically coupled to the reduction of oxygen (O_{2}) or nitrate (NO_{3}^{−}) as terminal electron acceptors. Under anaerobic conditions, some sulfur-oxidizing bacteria can use alternative oxidants, and certain phototrophic sulfur oxidizers derive energy from light while using sulfide or elemental sulfur as electron sources.

Several key microbial groups involved in sulfur oxidation include genera such as Beggiatoa, Thiobacillus, Acidithiobacillus, and Sulfurimonas, each adapted to specific redox conditions and environmental niches. Metabolic pathways like the Sox (sulfur oxidation) system, reverse dissimilatory sulfite reductase (rDSR) pathway, and the SQR (sulfide:quinone oxidoreductase) pathway are discussed as central mechanisms through which these microbes mediate sulfur transformations.

Microbial sulfur oxidation plays a major role in the biogeochemical cycling of sulfur and contributes to nutrient dynamics in environments hosting both abundant reduced sulfur species and low concentrations of oxygen. These include marine sediments, hydrothermal vents, cold seeps, sulfidic caves, oxygen minimum zones (OMZs), and stratified water columns. Microbial communities are structured by local biogeochemical gradients and their sulfur-oxidizing activity links carbon and nitrogen cycling in suboxic or anoxic environments. Through their metabolic versatility and ecological distribution, sulfur-oxidizing microorganisms help maintain redox balance and influence the chemistry of their surrounding environments, supporting broader ecosystem functioning.

== Ecology ==
The oxidation of hydrogen sulfide is a significant environmental process, particularly in the context of Earth's history, during which oceanic conditions were often characterized by very low oxygen and high sulfidic concentrations. The modern analog ecosystems are deep marine basins, for instance in the Black Sea, near the Cariaco trench and the Santa Barbara basin. Other zones of the ocean that experience periodic anoxic and sulfidic conditions are the upwelling zones off the coasts of Chile and Namibia, and hydrothermal vents, which are a key source of H_{2}S to the ocean. Sulfur oxidizing microorganisms (SOM) are thus restricted to upper sediment layers in these environments, where oxygen and nitrate are more readily available. The SOM may play an important yet unconsidered role in carbon sequestration, since some models and experiments with Gammaproteobacteria have suggested that sulfur-dependent carbon fixation in marine sediments could be responsible for almost half of total dark carbon fixation in the oceans. Further, they may have been critical to the evolution of eukaryotic organisms, given that sulfur metabolism is hypothesized to have driven the formation of the symbiotic associations that sustained eukaryotes (see below).

Although the biological oxidation of reduced sulfur compounds competes with abiotic chemical reactions (e.g. the iron-mediated oxidation of sulfide to iron sulfide (FeS) or pyrite (FeS_{2})), thermodynamic and kinetic considerations suggest that biological oxidation far exceeds the chemical oxidation of sulfide in most environments. Experimental data from the anaerobic phototroph Chlorobaculum tepidum indicates that microorganisms may enhance sulfide oxidation by three or more orders of magnitude. However, the general contribution of microorganisms to total sulfur oxidation in marine sediments is still unknown. The SOM of Alphaproteobacteria, Gammaproteobacteria and Campylobacterota account for average cell abundances of 10^{8} cells/m^{3} in organic-rich marine sediments. Considering that these organisms have a very narrow range of habitats, as explained below, a major fraction of sulfur oxidation in many marine sediments may be accounted for by these groups.

Given that the maximal concentrations of oxygen, nitrate and sulfide are usually separated in depth profiles, many SOM cannot directly access their hydrogen or electron sources (reduced sulfur species) and energy sources (O_{2} or nitrate) simultaneously. This limitation has led SOM to develop different morphological adaptations. The large sulfur bacteria (LSB) of the family Beggiatoaceae (Gammaproteobacteria) have been used as model organisms for benthic sulfur oxidation. They are known as 'gradient organisms,' species that are indicative of hypoxic (low oxygen) and sulfidic (rich in reduced sulfur species) conditions. They internally store large amounts of nitrate and elemental sulfur to overcome the spatial gap between oxygen and sulfide. Some species of Beggiatoaceae are filamentous and can thus glide between oxic/suboxic and sulfidic environments, while the non-motile species rely on nutrient suspensions, fluxes, or attach themselves to larger particles. Some aquatic, non-motile LSB are the only known free-living bacteria that utilize two distinct carbon fixation pathways: the Calvin-Benson cycle (used by plants and other photosynthetic organisms) and the reverse tricarboxylic acid cycle.

Another evolutionary strategy of SOM is form mutualistic relationships with motile eukaryotic organisms. The symbiotic SOM provides carbon and, in some cases, bioavailable nitrogen to the host, and receives enhanced access to resources and shelter in return. This lifestyle has evolved independently in sediment-dwelling ciliates, oligochaetes, nematodes, flatworms and bivalves. Recently, a new mechanism for sulfur oxidation was discovered in filamentous bacteria. This mechanism, called electrogenic sulfur oxidation (e-SOx), involves the formation of multicellular bridges that connect the oxidation of sulfide in anoxic sediment layers with the reduction of oxygen or nitrate in oxic surface sediments, generating electric currents over centimeter-long distances. The so-called cable bacteria are widespread in shallow marine sediments, and are believed to conduct electrons through structures inside a common periplasm of the multicellular filament. This process may influence the cycling of elements at aquatic sediment surfaces, for instance, by altering iron speciation. The LSB and cable bacteria are hypothesized to be restricted to undisturbed sediments with stable hydrodynamic conditions, while symbiotic SOM and their hosts have mainly been identified in permeable coastal sediments.

== Microbial diversity ==
The oxidation of reduced sulfur compounds is performed exclusively by bacteria and archaea. Archaea involved in this process are aerobic and belong to the order Sulfolobales, characterized by acidophiles (extremophiles that require low pHs to grow) and thermophiles (extremophiles that require high temperatures to grow). The most studied have been the genera Sulfolobus, an aerobic archaea, and Acidianus, a facultative anaerobe (i.e. an organism that can obtain energy either by aerobic or anaerobic respiration).

Sulfur oxidizing bacteria (SOB) are aerobic, anaerobic or facultative, with most of them being obligate (capable of metabolizing only a specific compound) or facultative (capable of metabolizing a secondary compound when primary compound is absent) autotrophs that can utilize either carbon dioxide or organic compounds as a source of carbon (mixotrophs). The most abundant and studied SOB are in the family Thiobacilliaceae, found in terrestrial environments, and in the family Beggiatoaceae, found in aquatic environments. Aerobic sulfur oxidizing bacteria are mainly mesophilic, growing optimally at moderate ranges of temperature and pH, although some are thermophilic and/or acidophilic. Outside of these families, other SOB described belong to the genera Acidithiobacillus, Aquaspirillum, Aquifex, Bacillus, Methylobacterium, Paracoccus, Pseudomonas Starkeya, Thermithiobacillus, and Xanthobacter. On the other hand, the cable bacteria belong to the family Desulfobulbaceae of the Desulfobacterota and are currently represented by two candidate genera, "Candidatus Electronema" and "Candidatus Electrothrix." The phylum Desulfobacterota also includes several lineages of anaerobic SOB.

Anaerobic SOB (AnSOB) are mainly neutrophilic/mesophilic photosynthetic autotrophs, obtaining energy from sunlight but using reduced sulfur compounds instead of water as hydrogen or electron donors for photosynthesis. AnSOB include some purple sulfur bacteria (Chromatiaceae) such as Allochromatium, and green sulfur bacteria (Chlorobiaceae), as well as the purple non-sulfur bacteria (Rhodospirillaceae) and some Cyanobacteria. The AnSOB Cyanobacteria are only able to oxidize sulfide to elemental sulfur and have been identified as Oscillatoria, Lyngbya, Aphanotece, Microcoleus, and Phormidium. Some AnSOB, such as the facultative anaerobes Thiobacillus spp., and Thermothrix sp., are chemolithoautotrophs, meaning that they obtain energy from the oxidation of reduced sulfur species, which is then used to fix CO_{2}. Others, such as some filamentous gliding green bacteria (Chloroflexaceae), are mixotrophs. From all of the SOB, the only group that directly oxidize sulfide to sulfate in an abundance of oxygen without accumulating elemental sulfur are the Thiobacilli. The other groups accumulate elemental sulfur, which they may oxidize to sulfate when sulfide is limited or depleted.

SOB have prospective use in environmental and industrial settings for detoxifying hydrogen sulfide, soil bioremediation, and wastewater treatment. In highly basic and ionic environments, Thiobacillus thiooxidans has been observed to increase the pH of soil from 1.5pH to a neutral 7.0pH. The use of SOB in the detoxification of hydrogen sulfide can circumvent detrimental effects from the conventional oxidation methods of hydrogen peroxide (H_{2}O_{2}), chlorine gas (Cl_{2}), and hypochlorite (NaClO) usage. SOB of the Beggiotoa genera oxidize sulfur compounds in microaerophilic up-flow sludge beds during wastewater treatment, and can be combined with nitrogen-reducing bacteria to effectively remove chemical build-ups in industrial settings.

The chemolithotrophic subset of SOB are gram-negative, rod-shaped bacteria, which abide in a wide range of environments—from anoxic to oxic, 4 to 90°C, and 1 to 9pH. Chemolithotrophic SOB play a key role in agricultural ecosystems by oxidizing reduced sulfur fertilizers into available forms, such as sulfate, for plants. SOB are often present in agricultural ecosystems at low densities, creating the opportunity for inoculation to increase nutrient availability. Presence of Thiobacillus thiooxidans has been shown to increase phosphorus availability in addition to the oxidation of sulfur. Utilization of SOB in treating alkaline and low available-sulfur soils, such as those in Iran, could directly increase crop yields in many ecosystems around the world.

Certain SOB have the potential to serve as biotic pesticides and anti-infectious agents for the control of crops. The benefits of utilization have been demonstrated through the outcomes of sulfur-oxidation, including balancing sodium content as well as increasing sulfur and phosphorus availability in the soil. Increased levels of reduced sulfur compounds in acidic soil permits the growth of Streptomyces scabies and S. ipomea, both pathogens of potato plants. Presence of SOB such as Thiobacillus have decreased the growth of these bacteria, as well as root pathogens such as Rhizoctonia solani. An additional impact of SOB on crop protection includes a collateral effect of increased sulfur content in plants, resulting in resistance to Rhizoctonia.

SOB such as Hallothiobacillus and Thiobacillus have been shown to play a role in regulating the pH of mining impoundment waters in an oscillating cycle over the course of several years. In the presence of oxygen, Halothiobacillus drives the ecosystem into a low pH, down to 4.3, and significantly decreases thiosulfate (S2O32-) levels through the sulfur oxidation (Sox) pathway. In the absence of oxygen, Thiobacillus dominates, leading to increased thiosulfate without a shift in pH. The increase in thiosulfate results from an incomplete Sox pathway coupled with the oxidation of sulfide to sulfite in the reverse dissimilatory sulfite reduction (rDsr) pathway. These opposing pathways result in adverse events for downstream environments by blocking the discharge of sulfur compounds.

== Biochemistry ==
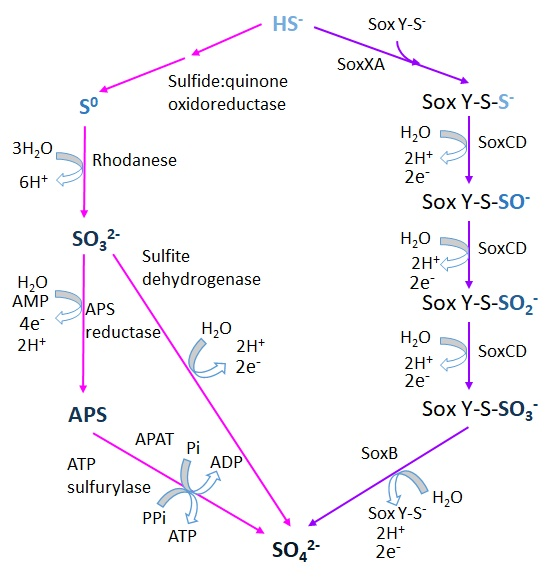
Enzymatic pathways used by sulfide-oxidizing microorganisms. Left: SQR pathway. Right: Sox pathway. HS^{−}: sulfide; S^{0}: elemental sulfur; SO_{3}^{2-}: sulfite; APS: adenosine-5'-phosphosulfate; SO4^{2-}: sulfate. Redrawn (adapted) with permission from Poser, A., Vogt, C., Knöller, K., Ahlheim, J., Weiss, H., Kleinsteuber, S., & Richnow, H. H. (2014). Stable sulfur and oxygen isotope fractionation of anoxic sulfide oxidation by two different enzymatic pathways. Environmental Science & Technology, 48(16), 9094–9102. Copyright 2008 American Chemical Society.

There are two described pathways for the microbial oxidation of sulfide:

- The sulfide:quinone oxidoreductase pathway (SQR), widespread in green sulfur bacteria, that involves the formation of intermediate compounds such as sulfite (SO_{3}^{2-}) and adenosine 5'-phosphosulfate (APS), which are known to have a significant oxygen isotope exchange. The step catalyzed by SQR can also be mediated by a membrane-bound flavocytochrome c-sulfide dehydrogenase (FCSD).
- The Sox pathway, or Kelly-Friedrich pathway as established in the Alphaproteobacteria Paracoccus spp., mediated by the thiosulfate-oxidizing multi-enzyme (TOMES) complex, in which sulfide or elemental sulfur form a complex with the enzyme SoxY and remain bound to it until its final conversion to sulfate.

Similarly, two pathways for the oxidation of sulfite (SO_{3}^{2-}) have been identified:

- The rDsr pathway, used by some microorganisms in the Chlorobiota (green sulfur bacteria), Alpha, Beta and Gammaproteobacteria, in which sulfide is oxidized to sulfite by means of a reverse operation of the dissimilatory sulfite reduction (Dsr) pathway. The sulfite generated by rDsr is then oxidized to sulfate by other enzymes.
- The direct oxidation of sulfite to sulfate by a type of mononuclear molybdenum enzyme known as sulfite oxidoreductase. Three different groups of these enzymes are recognized (the xanthine oxidase, sulfite oxidase (SO) and dimethyl sulfoxide reductase families), and they are present in the three domains of life.

On the other hand, at least three pathways exist for the oxidation of thiosulfate (S_{2}O_{3}^{2-}):

- The aforementioned Sox pathway, through which both sulfur atoms in thiosulfate are oxidized to sulfate without the formation of any free intermediate.
- The oxidation of thiosulfate (S_{2}O_{3}^{2-}) via the formation of tetrathionate (S_{4}O_{6}^{2-}) intermediate, that is present in several obligate chemolithotrophic Gamma and Betaproteobacteria as well as in facultative chemolithotrophic Alphaproteobacteria.
- The branched thiosulfate oxidation pathway, a mechanism in which water-insoluble globules of intermediate sulfur are formed during the oxidation of thiosulfate and sulfide. It is present in all the anoxygenic photolithotrophic green and purple sulfur bacteria, and the free-living as well as symbiotic strains of certain sulfur-chemolithotrophic bacteria.

In any of these pathways, oxygen is the preferred electron acceptor, but in oxygen-limited environments, nitrate, oxidized forms of iron and even organic matter are used instead.

Cyanobacteria normally perform oxygenic photosynthesis by utilizing water as an electron donor. However, in the presence of sulfide, oxygenic photosynthesis is inhibited, and some cyanobacteria can perform anoxygenic photosynthesis by the oxidation of sulfide to thiosulfate by using Photosystem I with sulfite as a possible intermediate sulfur compound.

=== Oxidation of sulfide ===
Sulfide oxidation can proceed under aerobic or anaerobic conditions. Aerobic sulfide-oxidizing bacteria usually oxidize sulfide to sulfate and are obligate or facultative chemolithoautotrophs. The latter can grow as heterotrophs, obtaining carbon from organic sources, or as autotrophs, using sulfide as the electron donor (energy source) for CO_{2} fixation. The oxidation of sulfide can proceed aerobically by two different mechanisms: substrate-level phosphorylation, which is dependent on adenosine monophosphate (AMP), and oxidative phosphorylation independent of AMP, which has been detected in several Thiobacilli (T. denitrificans, T. thioparus, T. novellus and T. neapolitanus), as well as in Acidithiobacillus ferrooxidans. The archaeon Acidianus ambivalens appears to possess both an ADP-dependent and an ADP-independent pathway for the oxidation of sulfide. Similarly, both mechanisms operate in the chemoautotroph Thiobacillus denitrificans, which can oxidize sulfide to sulfate anaerobically by utilizing nitrate—which is reduced to dinitrogen (N_{2})—as a terminal electron acceptor. Two other anaerobic strains that can perform a similar process were identified as similar to Thiomicrospira denitrificans and Arcobacter.

Among the heterotrophic SOB are included species of Beggiatoa that can grow mixotrophically, using sulfide to obtain energy (autotrophic metabolism) or to eliminate metabolically formed hydrogen peroxide in the absence of catalase (heterotrophic metabolism). Other organisms, such as the Bacteria Sphaerotilus natans and the yeast Alternaria are able to oxidize sulfide to elemental sulfur by means of the rDsr pathway.

=== Oxidation of elemental sulfur ===
Some Bacteria and Archaea can aerobically oxidize elemental sulfur to sulfuric acid. Acidithiobacillus ferrooxidans and Thiobacillus thioparus can oxidize sulfur to sulfite by means of an oxygenase enzyme, although it is hypothesized that an oxidase could also serve as an energy saving mechanism. In the anaerobic oxidation of elemental sulfur, it is hypothesized that the Sox pathway plays a significant role, although the complexity of this pathway is not yet thoroughly understood. Thiobacillus denitrificans uses oxidized forms of nitrogen as an energy source and terminal electron acceptor instead of oxygen.

=== Oxidation of thiosulfate and tetrathionate ===
Most of the chemosynthetic autotrophic bacteria that can oxidize elemental sulfur to sulfate are also able to oxidize thiosulfate to sulfate as a source of reducing power for carbon dioxide assimilation. However, the mechanisms that these bacteria utilize may vary, since some species, such as the photosynthetic purple bacteria, transiently accumulate extracellular elemental sulfur during the oxidation of tetrathionate, while other species, such as the green sulfur bacteria, do not. A direct oxidation reaction (T. versutus), as well as others that involve sulfite (T. denitrificans) and tetrathionate (A. ferrooxidans, A. thiooxidans, and Acidiphilum acidophilum ) as intermediate compounds, have been proposed. Some mixotrophic bacteria only oxidize thiosulfate to tetrathionate. The Sox (Sulfur-Oxidizing) multienzyme complex is the central pathway for pacultatively chemolithotrophic bacteria, particularly Alphaproteobacteria. the complex binds the substrate on the SoxYZ protein and completely oxidizes thiosulfate directly to sulfate without the formation of free intermediates.

Tetrathionate is the primary intermediate in the biochemical route known as the S4-intermediate pathway or the polythionate pathway. Although the mechanism of bacterial oxidation of tetrathionate is still unclear, the mechanism involves two primary enzymes, thiosulfate dehydrogenase, which catalyzes the formation of tetrathionate from thiosulfate, and tetrathionate hydrolase, which is responsible for the subsequent processing of tetrathionate. The overall mechanism is speculated to involve sulfur disproportionation, during which both sulfide and sulfate are produced from reduced sulfur species and hydrolysis reactions.

== Isotope fractionations ==
The fractionation of sulfur and oxygen isotopes during microbial sulfide oxidation (MSO) has been studied to assess its potential as a proxy to differentiate it from the abiotic oxidation of sulfur. The light isotopes of the elements that are most commonly found in organic molecules, such as ^{12}C, ^{16}O, ^{1}H, ^{14}N and ^{32}S, form bonds that are broken slightly more easily than bonds between the corresponding heavy isotopes, ^{13}C, ^{18}O, ^{2}H, ^{15}N and ^{34}S. Because there is a lower energetic cost associated with the use of light isotopes, enzymatic processes usually discriminate against the heavy isotopes, and, as a consequence, biological fractionations of isotopes are expected between the reactants and the products. A normal kinetic isotope effect is that in which the products are depleted significantly in the heavy isotope relative to the reactants (low heavy isotope to light isotope ratio), and although this is not always the case, the study of isotope fractionations between enzymatic processes may enable tracing of the source of the product.

=== Fractionation of oxygen isotopes ===
The formation of sulfate in aerobic conditions entails the incorporation of four oxygen atoms from water, and when coupled with dissimilatory nitrate reduction (DNR)—the preferential reduction pathway under anoxic conditions—this process can involve an additional contribution of oxygen atoms from nitrate. The δ^{18}O value of the newly formed sulfate thus depends on the δ^{18}O value of the water, the isotopic fractionation associated with the incorporation of oxygen atoms from water to sulfate and a potential exchange of oxygen atoms between sulfur and nitrogen intermediates and water. MSO has been found to produce small fractionations in ^{18}O compared to water (~5‰). Given the very small fractionation of ^{18}O that usually accompanies MSO, the relatively higher depletions in ^{18}O of the sulfate produced by MSO coupled to DNR (-1.8 to -8.5 ‰) suggest a kinetic isotope effect in the incorporation of oxygen from water to sulfate and the role of nitrate as a potential alternative source of light oxygen. The fractionations of oxygen produced by sulfur disproportionation from elemental sulfur have been found to be higher, with reported values from 8 to 18.4‰, which suggests a kinetic isotope effect in the pathways involved in the oxidation of elemental sulfur to sulfate, although more studies are necessary to determine what are the specific steps and conditions that favor this fractionation. The table below summarizes the reported fractionations of oxygen isotopes from MSO in different organisms and conditions.

Starting compound (reactant)	Intermediate or end compounds (products)	Organism	Average ^{18}O fractionation (product/reactant)	Details	Reference
Sulfide	Sulfate	A. ferrooxidans (chemolithotroph)	4.1‰ (30 °C)	Aerobic	Taylor et al. (1984)
Sulfide	Sulfate	A. ferrooxidans (chemolithotroph)	6.4‰ 3.8‰ (no temperature provided)	Aerobic Anaerobic	Thurston et al. (2010)
Sulfide	Sulfate	Thiomicrospira sp. strain CVO (chemolithotroph)	0‰ (no temperature provided)	Anaerobic, coupled to DNR	Hubert et al. (2009)
Sulfide	Sulfate	T. denitrificans (chemolithotroph); Sulfurimonas denitrificans (chemolithotroph)	−6 to −1.8‰ (30 °C) −8.5 to −2.1‰ (21 °C)	Anaerobic, coupled to DNR, SQR pathway Anaerobic, coupled to DNR, Sox pathway	Poser et al. (2014)
Elemental sulfur	Sulfate	Desulfocapsa thiozymogenes (chemolithotroph; "cable bacteria") Enrichment culture	11.0 to 18.4‰ (28 °C) 12.7 to 17.9‰ (28 °C)	Disproportionation, in the presence of iron scavengers	Böttcher et al. (2001)
Elemental sulfur	Sulfate	Desulfocapsa thiozymogenes (chemolithotroph; "cable bacteria") Enrichment culture	8 to 12 ‰ (28 °C)	Disproportionation, attenuated isotope effect due to reoxidation by manganese oxides	Böttcher & Thamdrup (2001)

=== Fractionation of sulfur isotopes ===
Aerobic MSO generates depletions in the ^{34}S of sulfate that have been found to be as small as −1.5‰ and as large as -18‰. For most microorganisms and oxidation conditions, only small fractionations accompany either the aerobic or anaerobic oxidation of sulfide, elemental sulfur, thiosulfate and sulfite to elemental sulfur or sulfate. The phototrophic oxidation of sulfide to thiosulfate under anoxic conditions also generates negligible fractionations. Although the change in sulfur isotopes is usually small during MSO, MSO oxidizes reduced forms of sulfur which are usually depleted in ^{34}S compared to seawater sulfate. Therefore, large-scale MSO can also significantly affect the sulfur isotopes of a reservoir. It has been proposed that the observed global average S-isotope fractionation is around −50‰, instead of the theoretically predicted value of -70‰, because of MSO.

In the chemolithotrophs Thiobacillus denitrificans and Sulfurimonas denitrificans, MSO coupled with DNR has the effect of inducing the SQR and Sox pathways, respectively. In both cases, a small fractionation in the ^{34}S of the sulfate, lower than -4.3‰, has been measured. Sulfate depletion in ^{34}S from MSO could be used to trace sulfide oxidation processes in the environment, although a distinction between the SQR and Sox pathways is not currently possible. The depletion produced by MSO coupled to DNR is similar to up to -5‰ depletion estimated for the ^{34}S in the sulfide produced from rDsr. In contrast, disproportionation under anaerobic conditions generates sulfate enriched in ^{34}S up to 9‰ and ~34‰ from sulfide and elemental sulfur, respectively. The isotope effect of disproportionation is, however, limited by the rates of sulfate reduction and MSO. Similar to the fractionation of oxygen isotopes, the larger fractionations in sulfate from the disproportionation of elemental sulfur point to a key step or pathway critical for inducing this large kinetic isotope effect. The table below summarizes the reported fractionations of sulfur isotopes from MSO in different organisms and conditions.

Starting compound (reactant)	Intermediate or end compounds (products)	Organism	Average ^{34}S fractionation (product/reactant)	Details	Oxidant	Reference
Sulfide	Sulfate	T. neopolitanus, T. intermedius and T. ferrooxidans (chemolithotrophs)	-2 to -5.5‰ (no temperature provided)	Aerobic pH 5 to 6	Carbon dioxide	Toran (1986)
Sulfide	Polythionates (S_{n}O_{6}^{2-}); Elemental sulfur Sulfate	T. concretivorus (chemolithotroph)	0.6 to 19‰ (30 °C) -2.5 to 1.2‰ (30 °C) -18 to -10.5‰ (30 °C)	Aerobic	Carbon dioxide	Kaplan & Rittenberg (1964)
Sulfide	Sulfate	A. ferrooxidans (chemolithotroph)	−1.5‰ −4‰ (no temperature provided)	Aerobic Anaerobic	Carbon dioxide	Thurston et al. (2010)
Sulfide	Sulfate	T. denitrificans (chemolithotroph); Sulfurimonas denitrificans (chemolithotroph)	−4.3 to −1.3‰ (30 °C) −2.9 to −1.6‰ (28 °C)	Anaerobic, coupled to DNR, SQR pathway Anaerobic, coupled to DNR, Sox pathway	Carbon dioxide	Poser et al. (2014)
Sulfide	Sulfate	Thiomicrospira sp. strain CVO (chemolithotroph)	1‰ (no temperature provided)	Anaerobic, coupled to DNR, no intermediates in complete oxidation of sulfide to sulfate (potentially only uses Sox pathway)	Carbon dioxide	Hubert et al. (2009)
Sulfide	Elemental sulfur	Chlorobium thiosulphatophilum (green sulfur bacteria)	5‰ (no temperature provided)	Anaerobic	Carbon dioxide	Kushkevych et al. (2024)
Sulfide	Thiosulfate	Oscillatoria sp. (Cyanobacteria) Calothrix sp. (Cyanobacteria)	0‰ (30 °C)	Anaerobic, anoxygenic photosynthesis	Carbon dioxide	Habicht et al.(1988)
Sulfide	Elemental sulfur Sulfate	Chromatium vinosum (purple sulfur bacteria)	0‰ (30-35 °C) 2‰ (30-35 °C)	Anaerobic, anoxygenic photosynthesis		Fry et al. (1985)
Sulfide	Elemental sulfur Sulfate	Ectothiorhodospira shaposhnikovii (purple sulfur bacteria)	±5‰ (no temperature provided)	Anaerobic, anoxygenic photosynthesis		Bryantseva et al. (2010)
Sulfide	Polythionates (S_{n}O_{6}^{2-}); Elemental sulfur Sulfate	Chromatium sp. (purple sulfur bacteria)	4.9 to 11.2‰ (30 °C) -10 to -3.6‰ (30 °C) -2.9 to -0.9‰ (30 °C)	Anaerobic		Kaplan & Rittenberg (1964)
Thiosulfate	Sulfate	T. intermedius (chemolithotroph)	-4.7‰ (no temperature provided)	Aerobic		Kushkevych et al. (2024)
Thiosulfate	Sulfate	T. versutus (chemolithotroph)	0‰ (28 °C)	Aerobic		Fry et al. (1986)
Thiosulfate	Elemental sulfur + Sulfate	Chromatium vinosum (purple sulfur bacteria)	0‰ (30-35 °C)	Anaerobic		Fry et al. (1985)
Thiosulfate	Sulfate	Desulfovibrio sulfodismutans (chemolithotroph) D. thiozymogenes (chemolithotroph; "cable bacteria")	For both bacteria: 0‰ (30 °C; compared to the sulfonate functional group); 2 to 4‰ (30 °C; compared to the sulfane functional group)	Anaerobic, disproportionation		Habicht et al.(1988)
Elemental sulfur	Sulfate	Desulfocapsa thiozymogenes (chemolithotroph; "cable bacteria") Enrichment culture	17.4‰ (28 °C) 16.6‰ (28 °C)	Anaerobic, disproportionation, in the presence of iron scavengers		Böttcher et al. (2001)
Elemental sulfur	Sulfate	Desulfocapsa sulfoexigens Desulfocapsa thiozymogenes (chemolithotrophs; "cable bacteria") Desulfobulbus propionicus (chemoorganotroph) Marine enrichments and sediments	16.4‰ (30 °C) 17.4‰ (30 °C) 33.9‰ (35 °C) 17.1 to 20.6‰ (28 °C)	Anaerobic, disproportionation		Canfield et al. (1998)
Elemental sulfur	Sulfate	Desulfocapsa thiozymogenes (chemolithotroph; "cable bacteria") Enrichment culture	−0.6 to 2.0‰ (28 °C) −0.2 to 1.1‰ (28 °C)	Anaerobic, disproportionation, attenuated isotope effect due to reoxidation by manganese oxides		Böttcher & Thamdrup (2001)
Sulfite	Sulfate	Desulfovibrio sulfodismutans (chemolithotroph) D. thiozymogenes (chemolithotroph; "cable bacteria")	9 to 12‰ (30 °C) 7 to 9‰ (30 °C)	Anaerobic, disproportionation		Habicht et al.(1988)

== See also ==
- Isotope fractionation
- Microbial metabolism
- Sulfur metabolism
- Sulfate-reducing microorganisms
- Dissimilatory sulfate reduction
- Dissimilatory nitrate reduction
