= Electronics =

Branch of physics and electrical engineering

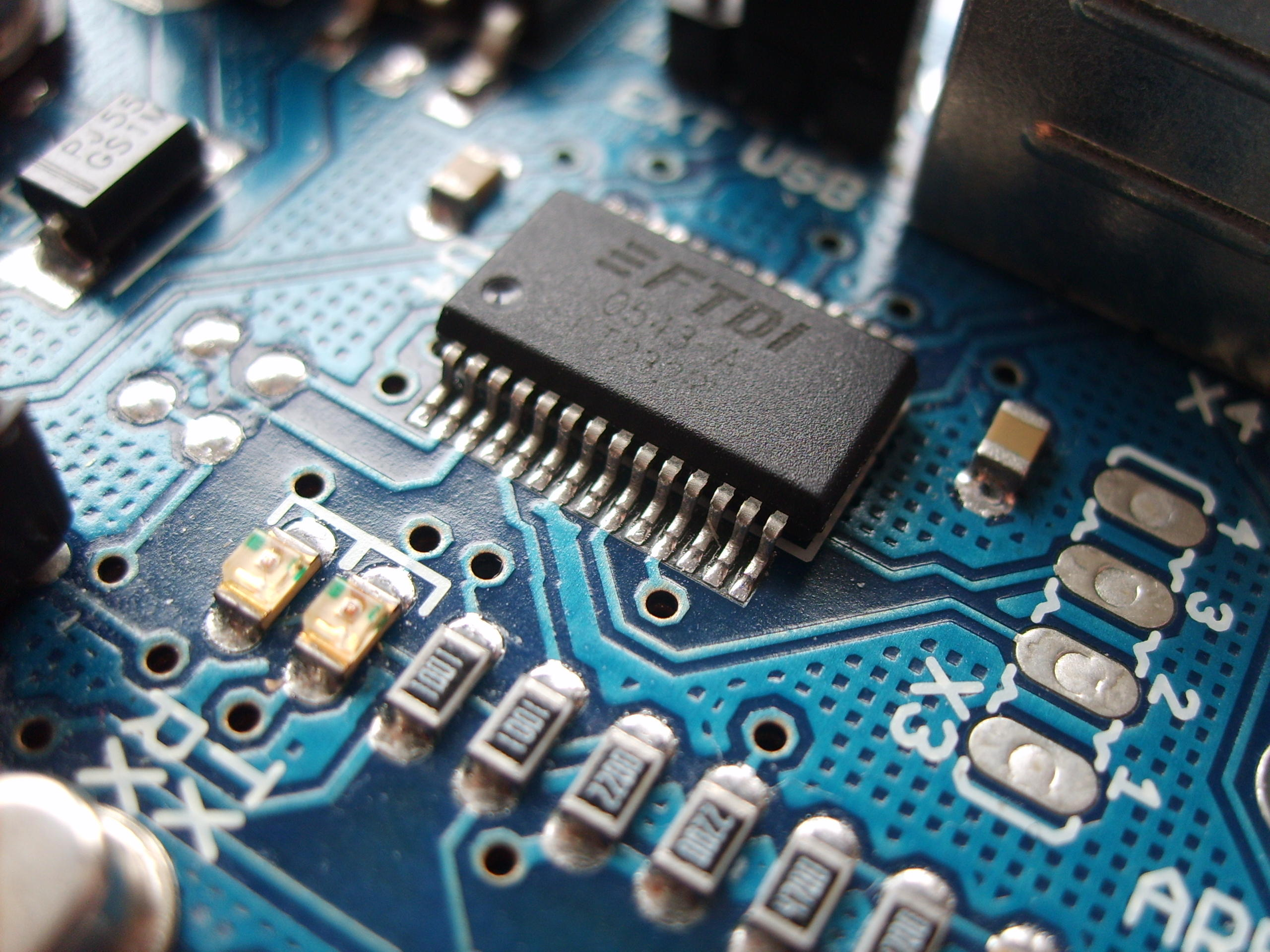
Modern surface-mount electronic components on a printed circuit board, with a large integrated circuit at the top

Electronics is a scientific and engineering discipline that studies and applies the principles of physics to design, create, and operate devices that manipulate electrons and other electrically charged particles. It is a subfield of physics and electrical engineering which uses active devices such as transistors, diodes, and integrated circuits to control and amplify the flow of electric current and to convert it from one form to another, such as from alternating current (AC) to direct current (DC) or from analog signals to digital signals.

Electronic devices have significantly influenced the development of many aspects of modern society, such as telecommunications, entertainment, education, health care, industry, and security. The main driving force behind the advancement of electronics is the semiconductor industry, which continually produces ever-more sophisticated electronic devices and circuits in response to global demand. The semiconductor industry is one of the global economy's largest and most profitable industries, with annual revenues exceeding $481 billion in 2018.

== History and development ==
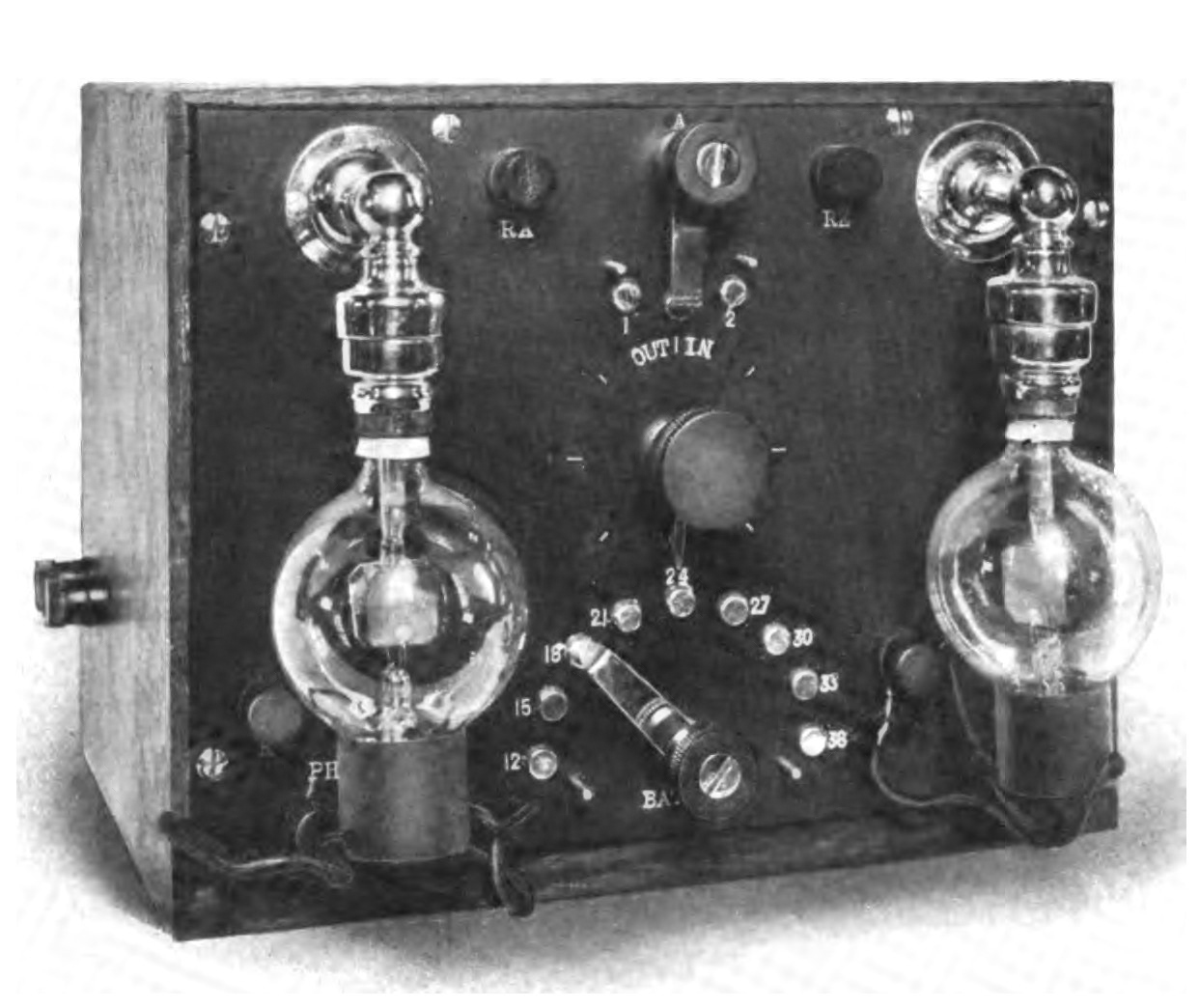
One of the earliest Audion radio receivers, constructed by De Forest in 1914

Karl Ferdinand Braun's development of the crystal detector, the first semiconductor device, in 1874 and the identification of the electron in 1897 by Sir Joseph John Thomson, along with the subsequent invention of the vacuum tube which could amplify and rectify small electrical signals, inaugurated the field of electronics and the electron age. Practical applications started with the invention of the diode by Ambrose Fleming and the triode by Lee De Forest in the early 1900s, which made the detection of small electrical voltages, such as radio signals from a radio antenna, practicable.

Vacuum tubes (thermionic valves) were the first active electronic components which controlled current flow by influencing the flow of individual electrons, and enabled the construction of equipment that used current amplification and rectification to give us radio, television, radar, long-distance telephony and much more. The early growth of electronics was rapid, and by the 1920s, commercial radio broadcasting and telecommunications were becoming widespread and electronic amplifiers were being used in such diverse applications as long-distance telephony and the music recording industry.

The next big technological step took several decades to appear, when the first working point-contact transistor was invented by John Bardeen and Walter Houser Brattain at Bell Labs in 1947. However, vacuum tubes continued to play a leading role in the field of microwave and high-power transmission as well as television receivers until the middle of the 1980s. Since then, solid-state devices have all but completely taken over. Vacuum tubes are still used in some specialist applications such as high power RF amplifiers, cathode-ray tubes, specialist audio equipment, guitar amplifiers and some microwave devices.

In April 1955, the IBM 608 was the first IBM product to use transistor circuits without any vacuum tubes and is believed to be the first all-transistorized calculator to be manufactured for the commercial market. The 608 contained more than 3,000 germanium transistors. Thomas J. Watson Jr. ordered all future IBM products to use transistors in their design. From that time on, transistors were almost exclusively used for computer logic circuits and peripheral devices. However, early junction transistors were relatively bulky devices that were difficult to manufacture on a mass-production basis, which limited them to a number of specialised applications.

The MOSFET was invented at Bell Labs between 1955 and 1960. It was the first truly compact transistor that could be miniaturised and mass-produced for a wide range of uses. Its advantages include high scalability, affordability, low power consumption, and high density. It revolutionized the electronics industry. As the complexity of circuits grew, problems arose. One problem was the size of the circuit. A complex circuit like a computer was dependent on speed. If the components were large, the wires interconnecting them must be long. The electric signals took time to go through the circuit, thus slowing the computer. The invention of the integrated circuit by Jack Kilby and Robert Noyce solved this problem by making all the components and the chip out of the same block (monolith) of semiconductor material. The circuits could be made smaller, and the manufacturing process could be automated. This led to the idea of integrating all components on a single-crystal silicon wafer, which led to small-scale integration (SSI) in the early 1960s, and then medium-scale integration (MSI) in the late 1960s, followed by VLSI. In 2008, billion-transistor processors became commercially available.

== Subfields ==
- Analog electronics
- Audio electronics
- Avionics
- Bioelectronics
- Circuit design
- Digital electronics
- Electronic components
- Embedded systems
- Integrated circuits
- Microelectronics
- Nanoelectronics
- Optoelectronics
- Power electronics
- Printed circuit boards
- Semiconductor devices
- Sensors
- Telecommunications

== Devices and components ==
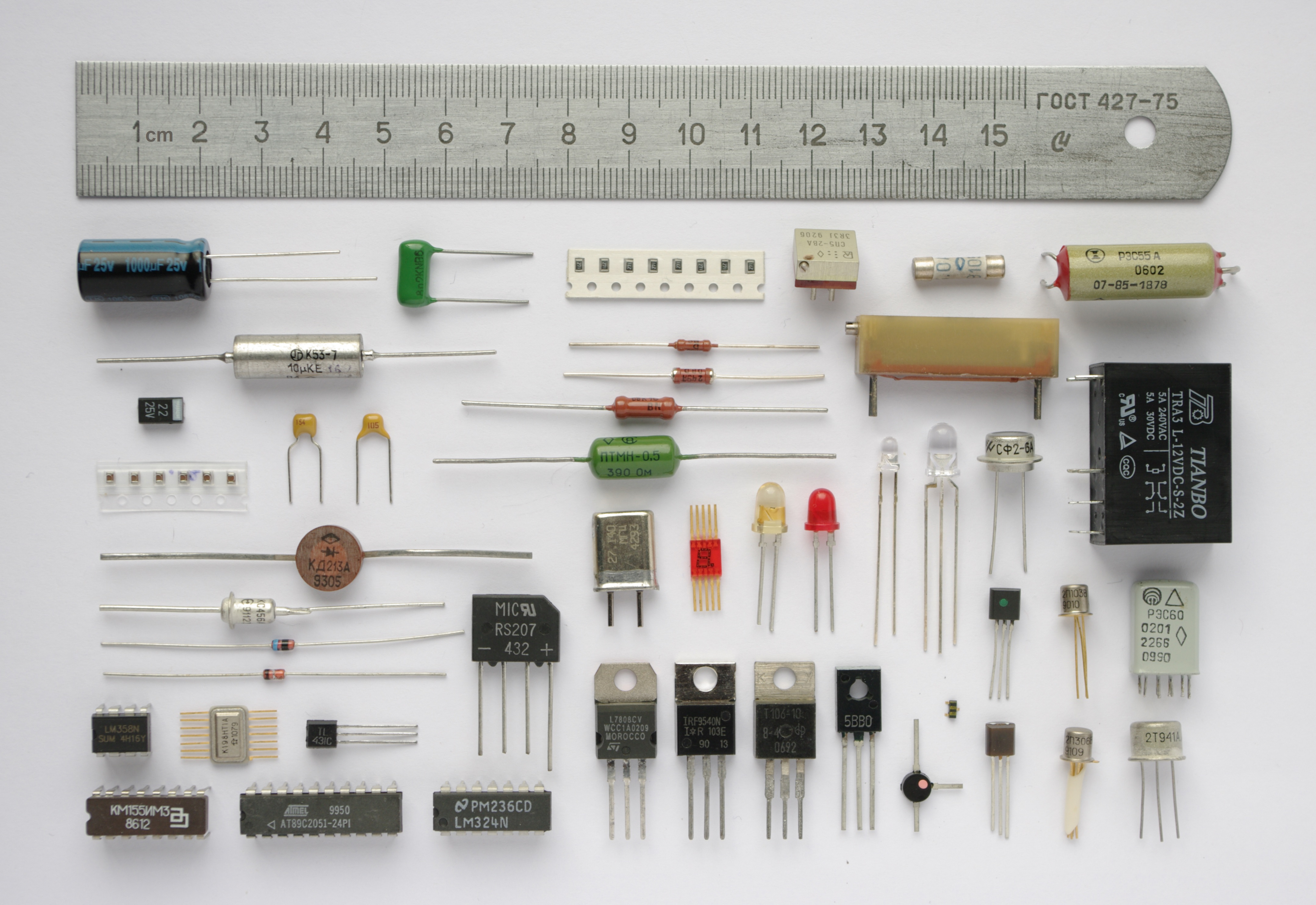
Various electronic components

An electronic component is any component, either active or passive, in an electronic system or electronic device. Components are connected together, usually by being soldered to a printed circuit board (PCB), to create an electronic circuit with a particular function. Components may be packaged singly or in more complex groups as integrated circuits. Passive electronic components are capacitors, inductors, resistors, whilst active components are such as semiconductor devices; transistors and thyristors, which control current flow at electron level.

== Types of circuits ==
Electronic circuit functions can be divided into two function groups: analog and digital. A particular device may consist of circuitry that has either or a mix of the two types. Analog circuits are becoming less common, as many of their functions are being digitized.

=== Analog circuits ===
Analog circuits use a continuous range of voltage or current for signal processing, as opposed to the discrete levels used in digital circuits. Analog circuits were common throughout electronic devices in the early years, in devices such as radio receivers and transmitters. Analog electronic computers were valuable for solving problems with continuous variables until digital processing advanced.

As semiconductor technology developed, many of the functions of analog circuits were taken over by digital circuits, and modern circuits that are entirely analog are less common; their functions being replaced by hybrid approach which, for instance, uses analog circuits at the front end of a device receiving an analog signal, and then use digital processing using microprocessor techniques thereafter.

Sometimes it may be difficult to classify some circuits that have elements of both linear and non-linear operation. An example is the voltage comparator, which receives a continuous range of voltage but only outputs one of two levels, as in a digital circuit. Similarly, an overdriven transistor amplifier can take on the characteristics of a controlled switch, having essentially two levels of output.

Analog circuits are still widely used for signal amplification, such as in the entertainment industry, and conditioning signals from analog sensors, such as in industrial measurement and control.

=== Digital circuits ===
Digital circuits are electric circuits based on discrete voltage levels. Digital circuits use Boolean algebra and are the basis of all digital computers and microprocessor devices. They range from simple logic gates to large integrated circuits, employing millions of such gates.

Digital circuits use a binary system with two voltage levels labelled 0 and 1 to indicate logical status. Often logic 0 will be a lower voltage and referred to as Low while logic 1 is referred to as High. However, some systems use the reverse definition (0 is High) or are current based. Quite often, the logic designer may reverse these definitions from one circuit to the next as they see fit to facilitate their design. The definition of the levels as 0 or 1 is arbitrary.

Ternary (with three states) logic has been studied, and some prototype computers made, but have not gained any significant practical acceptance. Universally, computers and digital signal processors are constructed with digital logic circuits using transistors such as MOSFETs in the electronic logic gates to generate binary states.

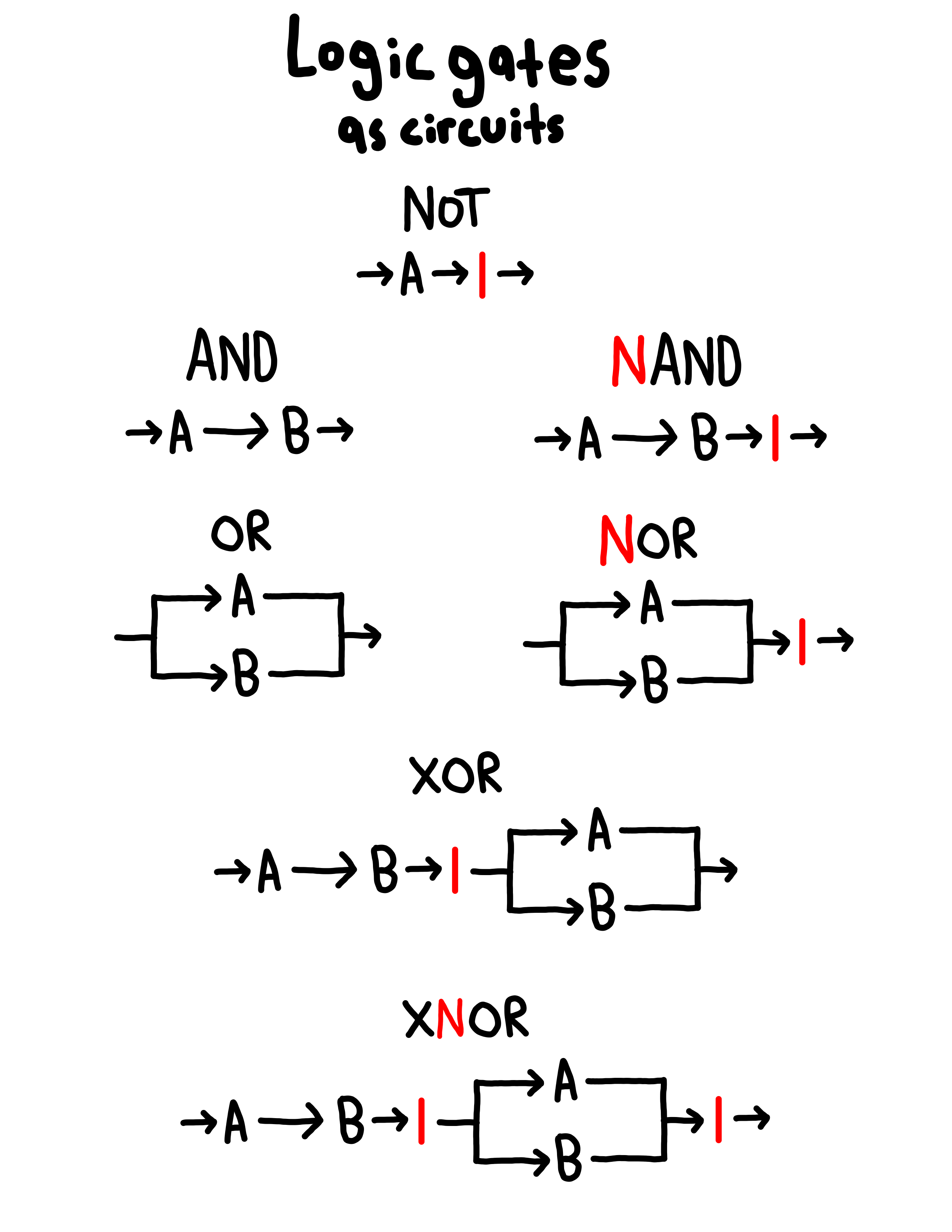
A selection of logic gates, used extensively in digital electronics

- Logic gates
- Adders
- Flip-flops
- Counters
- Registers
- Multiplexers
- Schmitt triggers

Highly integrated devices:

- Memory chip
- Microprocessors
- Microcontrollers
- Application-specific integrated circuit (ASIC)
- Digital signal processor (DSP)
- Field-programmable gate array (FPGA)
- Field-programmable analog array (FPAA)
- System on chip (SOC)

== Design ==
Electronic systems design deals with the multi-disciplinary design issues of complex electronic devices and systems, such as mobile phones and computers. The subject covers a broad spectrum, from the design and development of an electronic system (new product development) to assuring its proper function, service life and disposal. Electronic systems design is therefore the process of defining and developing complex electronic devices to satisfy specified requirements of the user.

Due to the complex nature of electronics theory, laboratory experimentation is an important part of the development of electronic devices. These experiments are used to test or verify the engineer's design and detect errors. Historically, electronics labs have consisted of electronics devices and equipment located in a physical space, although in more recent years the trend has been towards electronics lab simulation software, such as CircuitLogix, Multisim, and PSpice.

=== Computer-aided design ===
Today's electronics engineers have the ability to design circuits using premanufactured building blocks such as power supplies, semiconductors (i.e., semiconductor devices, such as transistors), and integrated circuits. Electronic design automation software programs include schematic capture programs and printed circuit board design programs. Popular names in the EDA software world are NI Multisim, Cadence (ORCAD), EAGLE PCB and Schematic, Mentor (PADS PCB and LOGIC Schematic), Altium (Protel), LabCentre Electronics (Proteus), gEDA, KiCad and many others.

== Negative qualities ==
=== Thermal management ===
Heat generated by electronic circuitry must be dissipated to prevent immediate failure and improve long-term reliability. Heat dissipation is mostly achieved by passive conduction/convection. Means to achieve greater dissipation include heat sinks and fans for air cooling, and other forms of computer cooling such as water cooling. These techniques use convection, conduction, and radiation of heat energy.

=== Noise ===
Electronic noise is defined as unwanted disturbances superimposed on a useful signal that tend to obscure its information content. Noise is not the same as signal distortion caused by a circuit. Noise is associated with all electronic circuits. Noise may be electromagnetically or thermally generated, which can be decreased by lowering the operating temperature of the circuit. Other types of noise, such as shot noise, cannot be removed as they are due to limitations in physical properties.

== Packaging methods ==
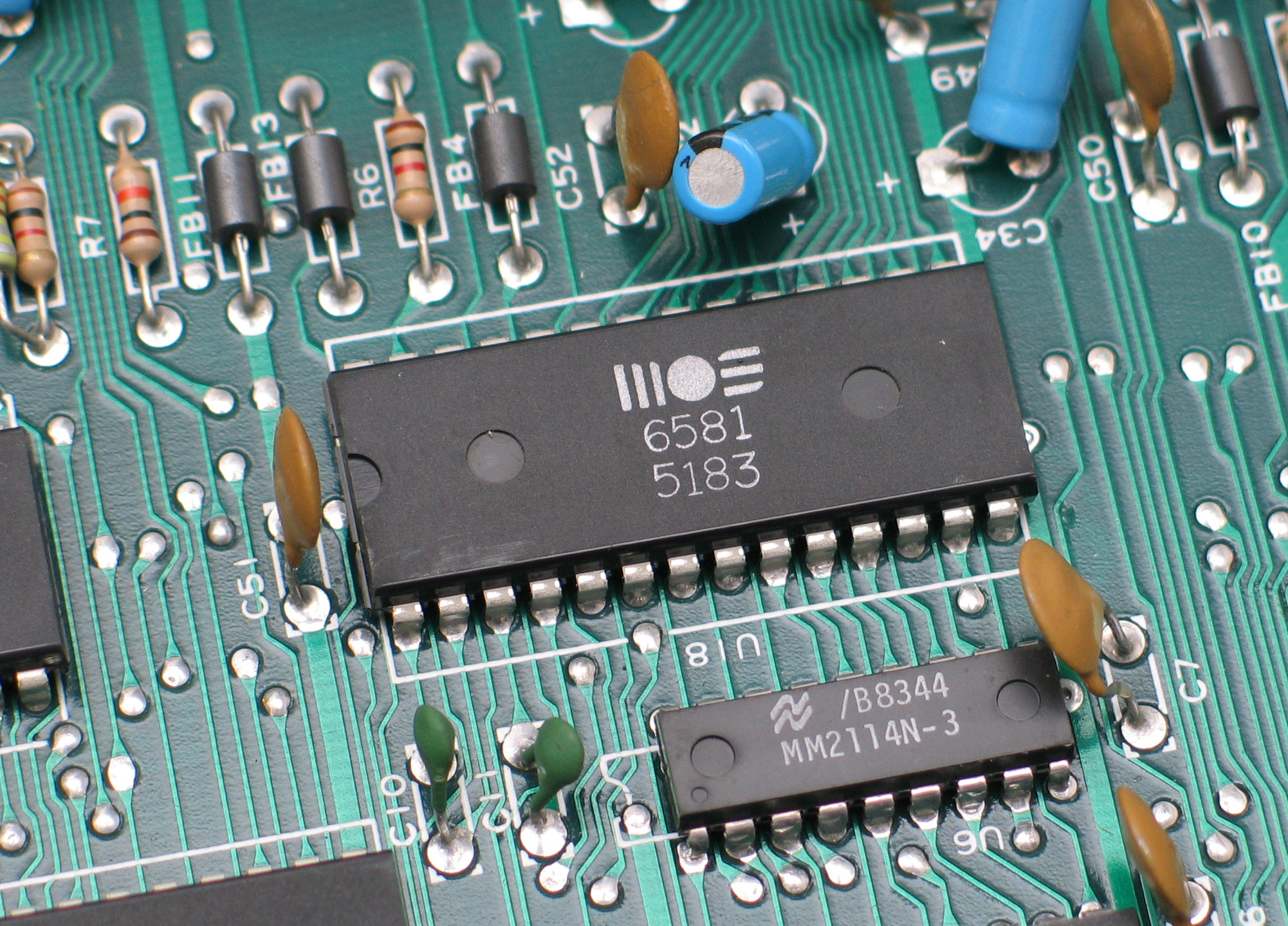
Through-hole devices mounted on the circuit board of a mid-1980s home computer. Axial-lead devices are at the upper left, while blue radial-lead capacitors are at the upper right.

Many different methods of connecting components have been used over the years. For instance, early electronics often used point-to-point wiring with components attached to wooden breadboards to construct circuits. Cordwood construction and wire wrap were other methods used. Most modern-day electronics now use printed circuit boards made of materials such as FR-4 and FR-2. Electrical components are generally mounted to PCBs using through-hole or surface mount.

Through-hole technology uses component leads inserted through holes in a printed circuit board and soldered on the opposite side. Surface-mount technology places components directly onto pads on the surface of the board, allowing higher component density and automated assembly. Modern electronic assemblies may use both methods, with through-hole components commonly kept where greater mechanical strength or easier manual replacement is needed.

Health and environmental concerns associated with electronics assembly have gained increased attention in recent years.

== Industry ==
The electronics industry consists of various branches. The central driving force behind the entire electronics industry is the semiconductor industry, which has annual sales of over $481 billion as of 2018. The most widely manufactured electronic device is the metal-oxide-semiconductor field-effect transistor (MOSFET), with an estimated 13 sextillion MOSFETs having been manufactured between 1960 and 2018. In the 1960s, U.S. manufacturers were unable to compete with Japanese companies such as Sony and Hitachi which could produce high-quality goods at lower prices. By the 1980s, however, U.S. manufacturers became the world leaders in semiconductor development and assembly.

However, during the 1990s and subsequently, the industry shifted overwhelmingly to East Asia (a process begun with the initial movement of microchip mass-production there in the 1970s), as plentiful, cheap labor and increasing technological sophistication became widely available there.

Over three decades, the United States' global share of semiconductor manufacturing capacity fell from 37% in 1990 to 12% in 2022. America's pre-eminent semiconductor manufacturer, Intel Corporation, fell far behind its subcontractor Taiwan Semiconductor Manufacturing Company (TSMC) in manufacturing technology.

By that time, Taiwan had become the world's leading source of advanced semiconductors—followed by South Korea, the United States, Japan, Singapore, and China.

Important semiconductor industry facilities (which often are subsidiaries of a leading producer based elsewhere) also exist in Europe (notably the Netherlands), Southeast Asia, South America, and Israel.

== See also ==
- Index of electronics articles
- Outline of electronics
- Atomtronics
- Audio engineering
- Biodegradable electronics
- Broadcast engineering
- Computer engineering
- Electronics engineering
- Electronics engineering technology
- Fuzzy electronics
- Go-box
- Marine electronics
- Photonics
- Robotics
