= Zirconium dibromide =

Names
- IUPAC name dibromozirconium
- Other names Zirconium(II) bromide, zirconium(2+) dibromide

Identifiers
CAS Number	24621-17-8
3D model (JSmol)	Interactive image
ChemSpider	120707
PubChem CID	136989
- InChI: InChI=1S/2BrH.Zr/h2*1H;/q;;+2/p-2 Key: GWWKZPLMVIATIO-UHFFFAOYSA-L
- SMILES: Br[Zr]Br

Properties
Chemical formula	ZrBr_{2}
Appearance	black solid
Density	6.17 g/cm^{3}
- Except where otherwise noted, data are given for materials in their standard state (at 25 °C [77 °F], 100 kPa). Infobox references

Zirconium dibromide is an inorganic chemical compound with the chemical formula ZrBr_{2}.

== Synthesis ==
The compound can be prepared by reacting both elements:

Zr + Br_{2} → ZrBr_{2}

Also, there is a method for obtaining zirconium dibromide by thermal disproportionation of ZrBr at 550 °C.
