= Desulfocapsa =

Scientific classification
- Domain: Bacteria
- Kingdom: Pseudomonadati
- Phylum: Proteobacteria
- Class: Desulfobulbia
- Order: Desulfobulbales
- Family: Desulfocapsaceae
- Genus: Desulfocapsa; Janssen et al. 1997

Type species
- Desulfocapsa thiozymogenes Janssen et al. 1997

Species
- D. sulfexigens; D. thiozymogenes

Genus of bacteria

Desulfocapsa is a bacterial genus from the family Desulfocapsaceae.

== Phylogeny ==
The currently accepted taxonomy is based on the List of Prokaryotic names with Standing in Nomenclature (LPSN) and National Center for Biotechnology Information (NCBI).

16S rRNA based LTP_10_2024

- Desulfocapsa
  - D. sulfexigens corrig. Finster et al. 2000
  - D. thiozymogenes Janssen et al. 1997

120 marker proteins based GTDB 10-RS226

- Desulfocapsa
  D. sulfexigens
