= Blue Magic =

Blue Magic can refer to:

- Blue Magic (band), a R&B and soul music vocal quintet
  - Blue Magic (album)
- "Blue Magic" (song), a song from rapper Jay-Z's album American Gangster
- Blue Magic, a novel by A. M. Dellamonica
- Blue Magic, a novel by Edith Ballinger Price
- The name of a high quality brand of heroin marketed by drug lord Frank Lucas, which later inspired the film American Gangster and the song of the same name by Jay-Z.

Others

- A type of magic in the Final Fantasy video game; see Final Fantasy magic
- Blue Magic is the name of the Direct to Home venture by Reliance ADAG
- "Magic blue" refers to the chemical compound Tris(4-bromophenyl)ammoniumyl hexachloroantimonate
