= Dismutase =

Enzyme which catalyzes a dismutation reaction

A dismutase is an enzyme that catalyzes a dismutation reaction.

== Examples ==
- Formaldehyde dismutase
- Superoxide dismutase
- Chlorite dismutase
