= Triarylamine =

In chemistry, a triarylamine has the formula NAr_{3} where Ar is any of several aryl groups. The parent member is triphenylamine. Triarylamines are of interest as components of molecular electronics as well as some dyes.

Many hundreds of triarylamines have been prepared.

== Preparation, structure, reactions ==
Triarylamines can be produced by arylation of diarylamides with aryl iodides:

Ar_{2}NLi + Ar'I → Ar_{2}Ar'N + LiI

Buchwald-Hartwig coupling methods have also been applied.

Structure of the cation ((C_{6}H_{5})_{2}N)_{2}C_{6}H^{+}_{4}. The phenylene C-N distances are 1.36 pm vs 143 pm in the neutral parent.

Ammoniumyl cations, the radical products of triarylamine (single-electron) oxidation, are used widely in organic and organometallic chemistry. One popular compound is magic blue. Some have been characterized by X-ray crystallography.
