= Desulfovibrio sulfodismutans =

Scientific classification
- Domain: Bacteria
- Kingdom: Pseudomonadati
- Phylum: Thermodesulfobacteriota
- Class: Desulfovibrionia
- Order: Desulfovibrionales
- Family: Desulfovibrionaceae
- Genus: Desulfovibrio
- Species: D. sulfodismutans

Binomial name
- Desulfovibrio sulfodismutans Bak & Pfennig, 1987

Species of bacterium

Desulfovibrio sulfodismutans is a bacterium. It grows under strictly anaerobic conditions by disproportionation of thiosulfate or sulfite to sulfate and sulfide. ThAc01 is its type strain.
