= Cable bacteria =

Species of bacteria from Desulfobulbaceae family

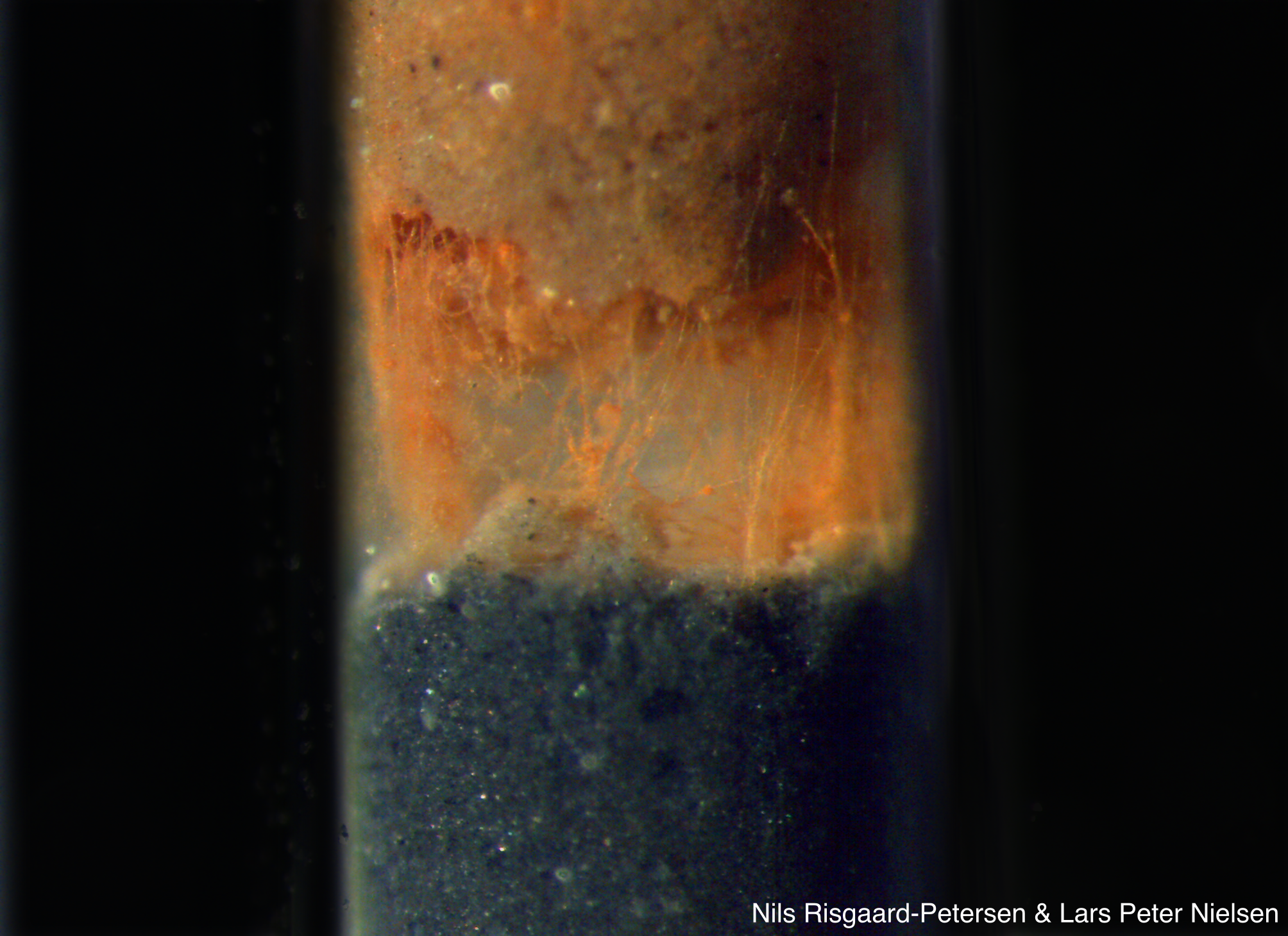
Cable bacteria in between two layers of sediment split apart inside a glass cylinder.

Cable bacteria are filamentous bacteria that conduct electricity across distances over 1 cm in sediment and groundwater aquifers. Cable bacteria conduct long-distance electron transport, connecting electron donors to electron acceptors, enabling previously separated oxidation and reduction reactions. Cable bacteria couple the reduction of oxygen or nitrate at the sediment surface to oxidation of sulfide in deeper, anoxic, sediment layers.

Diagram demonstrating cable bacteria metabolism in surface sediment. Hydrogen sulfide (H_{2}S) is oxidized in the sulfidic sediment layer, and the resulting electrons (e^{−}) are conducted up through the cable bacteria filament to the oxic layer and used to reduce molecular oxygen (O_{2}).

== History ==
Long-distance electrical conductance in sediment was first observed in 2010 as a spatial separation of sulfide oxidation and oxygen reduction in marine sediment that was interrupted and re-established at a rate faster than could be explained by chemical diffusion. It was reported that this conductance could be observed across a non-conductive layer of glass microspheres, where the only possible conductive structures were filamentous bacteria belonging to the Desulfobulbaceae family.

The conductivity of single filaments was demonstrated by observing the oxidation state of cytochromes using Raman microscopy. The same phenomenon was reported in freshwater sediments and groundwater aquifers. Within a 15 cm thick top layer of sediment, cable bacteria densities reaching up to 2 km per square centimeter of surface were observed.

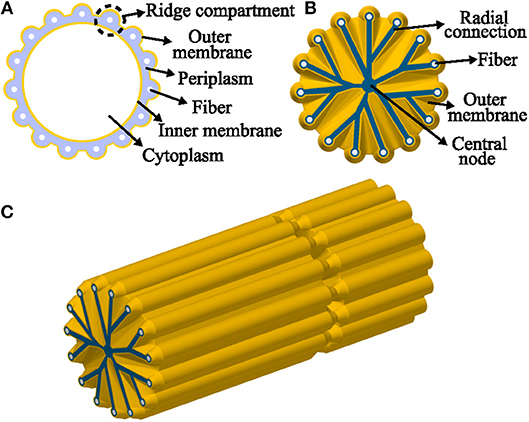
Model representation of a cable bacteria cell

== Morphology ==
Cable bacteria filaments have a diameter of 1–4 μm and lengths of over 1 cm. The individual cells in the filaments are rod-shaped with an average length of 3 μm. As Gram-negative bacteria, they have two cell-enveloping membranes, with each cell having its own individual inner cell membrane, but the outer cell membrane is shared by all cells in a filament. The common periplasm includes 15–60 electron-conducting fibers with a diameter of ~50 nm, which are visible from the outside as parallel, longitudinal ribs. They consist of proteins that are rich in nickel and sulfur, are electrically insulated, and span the length of the filament.

== Distribution ==
Cable bacteria are generally found in reduced sediments. They can be present as a single filament or as an agglomeration. Cable bacteria can intertwine with the root hairs of aquatic plants and are present in the rhizosphere. They inhabit a range of salinities including freshwater, saltwater lakes, and seawater. Cable bacteria have been identified worldwide, including Denmark, the Netherlands, Japan, Australia, and the United States.

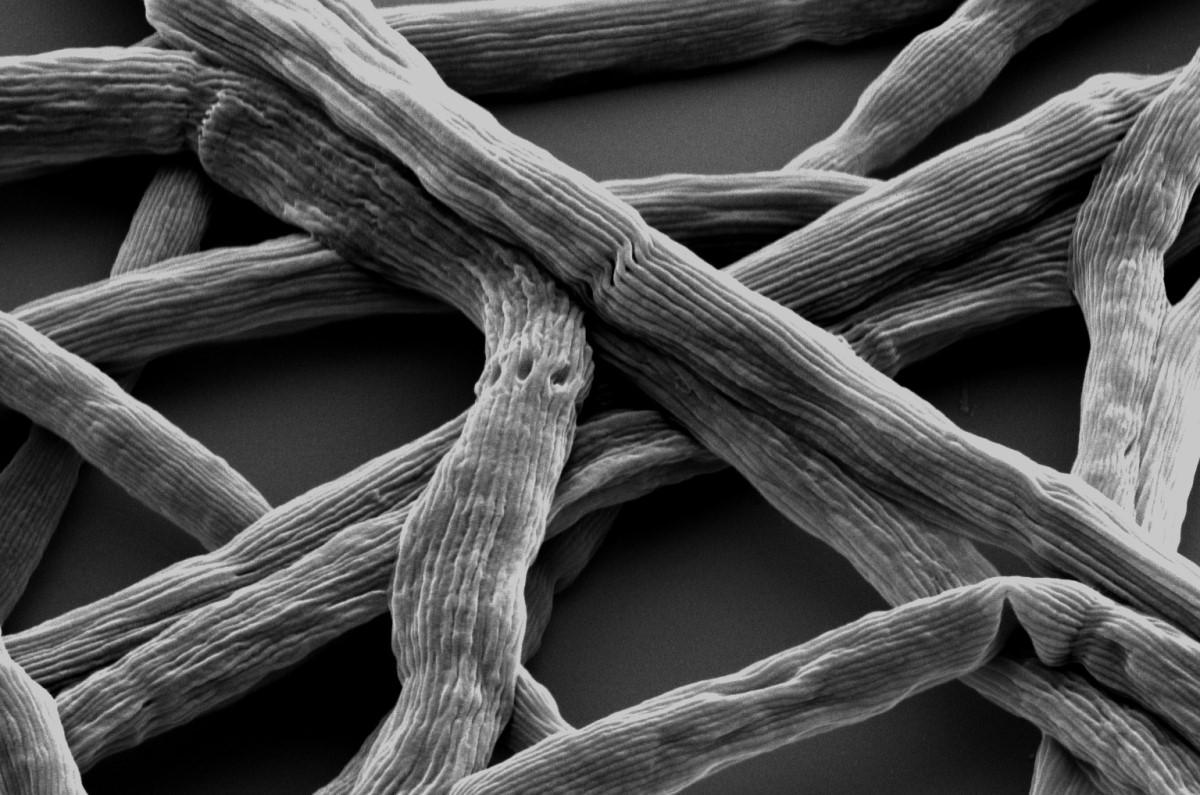
Ca. Electronema sp.

== Motility ==
Cable bacteria lack flagella, but are capable of gliding motility by propelling themselves forward through ejecting substances. Cable bacteria can move as fast as 2.2 μm/s, with an average speed of 0.5 μm/s. Speed is not related to size. On average a cable bacterium glide approximately 74 μm without interruption.

Cable bacteria filaments tend to bend in half, and their movement is led by the apex of the bend as opposed to leading with a filament tip. Twisting to move through rotational gliding rarely occurs.

Cable bacteria likely engage in oxygen chemotaxis, as they move when in anoxic or hypoxic environments, and stop in the presence of oxygen. Although motility is important for other microorganisms, once cable bacteria reach a place that connects oxygen to sulfide, they become sedentary. The reduced need for motility could explain why the cable bacteria genome contains fewer operons related to chemotaxis than other Desulfobulbaceae.

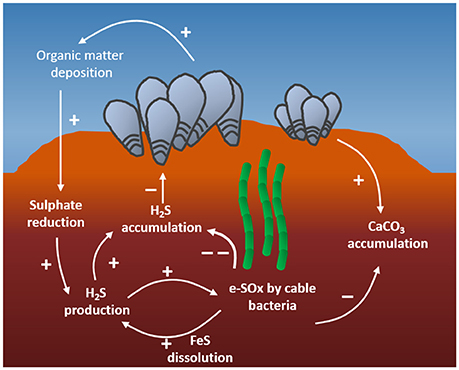
Interactions between reef-building bivalves and cable bacteria

== Taxonomy ==
Two candidate genera are described: Ca Electrothrix containing four candidate species, found in marine or brackish sediments, and Ca Electronema containing two candidate species, found in freshwater sediments, seem to be a monophyletic group. In 2025 the Electrothrix genera added newly described Ca Electrothrix yaqonensis specie.

Freshwater and marine cable bacteria are 88% similar based on 16S ribosomal RNA comparisons. These genera are classified within the family Desulfobulbaceae, phylum Desulfobacterota. Cable bacteria are defined by function rather than phylogeny, and further taxa may be discovered.

== Ecological significance ==
Cable bacteria influence the surrounding environment's geochemical properties. Their activity promotes the oxidation of iron at the surface of the sediment, and the resulting iron oxides bind phosphorus-containing compounds and hydrogen sulfide, limiting the amount of phosphorus and hydrogen sulfide in the water. Phosphorus can cause eutrophication, and hydrogen sulfide can be toxic to marine life, meaning that cable bacteria play an important role in maintaining coastal marine ecosystems.

The presence of cable bacteria can decrease methane emissions from saturated soils. The transfer of electrons through cable bacteria allows the sulfate reduction that occurs in inundated soils to be balanced by sulfide oxidation. Oxidation is possible because of the release of electrons through the filaments. This balance allows sulfate to remain readily available for sulfate reducing bacteria, which out compete methanogens. This decreases methane production by methanogens.

== Applications ==
Cable bacteria are associated with benthic microbial fuel cells, devices that convert chemical energy on the ocean floor to electrical energy. Cable bacteria may play a role in increasing the efficiency of microbial fuel cells deployed in sedimentary environments. Cable bacteria are associated with a bioelectrochemical system that enhances the degradation of marine sediment contaminated by hydrocarbons and thus may play a role in oil spill cleanup technologies.

== See also ==
- Biodegradable electronics
- Electric bacteria
