= Formaldehyde dismutase =

formaldehyde dismutase

Identifiers
- EC no.: 1.2.98.1
- CAS no.: 85204-94-0

Databases
- IntEnz: IntEnz view
- BRENDA: BRENDA entry
- ExPASy: NiceZyme view
- KEGG: KEGG entry
- MetaCyc: metabolic pathway
- PRIAM: profile
- PDB structures: RCSB PDB PDBe PDBsum
- Gene Ontology: AmiGO / QuickGO
Search
- PMC: articles
- PubMed: articles
- NCBI: proteins

In enzymology, formaldehyde dismutase (EC 1.2.98.1) is an enzyme that catalyzes the chemical reaction

2
formaldehyde
+ H_{2}O
formic acid
+
methanol

This enzyme converts formaldehyde into formic acid and methanol.

This enzyme belongs to the family of oxidoreductases, specifically those acting on the aldehyde or oxo group of donor with other acceptors. The systematic name of this enzyme class is formaldehyde:formaldehyde oxidoreductase. Other names in common use include aldehyde dismutase, and cannizzanase.

== Structural studies ==
As of late 2007, only one structure has been solved for this class of enzymes, with the PDB accession code 2DPH.
