= Biodegradable electronics =

Type of electric circuits

Biodegradable electronics are electronic circuits and devices with a limited lifetime owing to their tendency to biodegrade. Such devices are proposed to represent useful medical implant, and temporary communication sensors.

Organic electronic devices as compostable material platforms have been fabricated on aluminum foil and paper to accommodate these expanded functionalities. In one embodiment of this idea, paper films were utilized as a combination substrate and gate dielectric for use with pentacene-based active layers. This idea was expanded upon to create complete circuits using foldable paper-based substrates.

Silk coatings could underpin an electronic devices because it melts away when the device is no longer needed. One test device, a heating circuit powered by beaming radio waves at it, was implanted under the skin of a rat with a wound. After the wound had healed, the implant simply melts away. The US military research agency DARPA funded research on building a tiny dissolving camera with this silk coating for use as a disposable spy camera.

Cable bacteria give insight to how biodegradable electronics could be made.

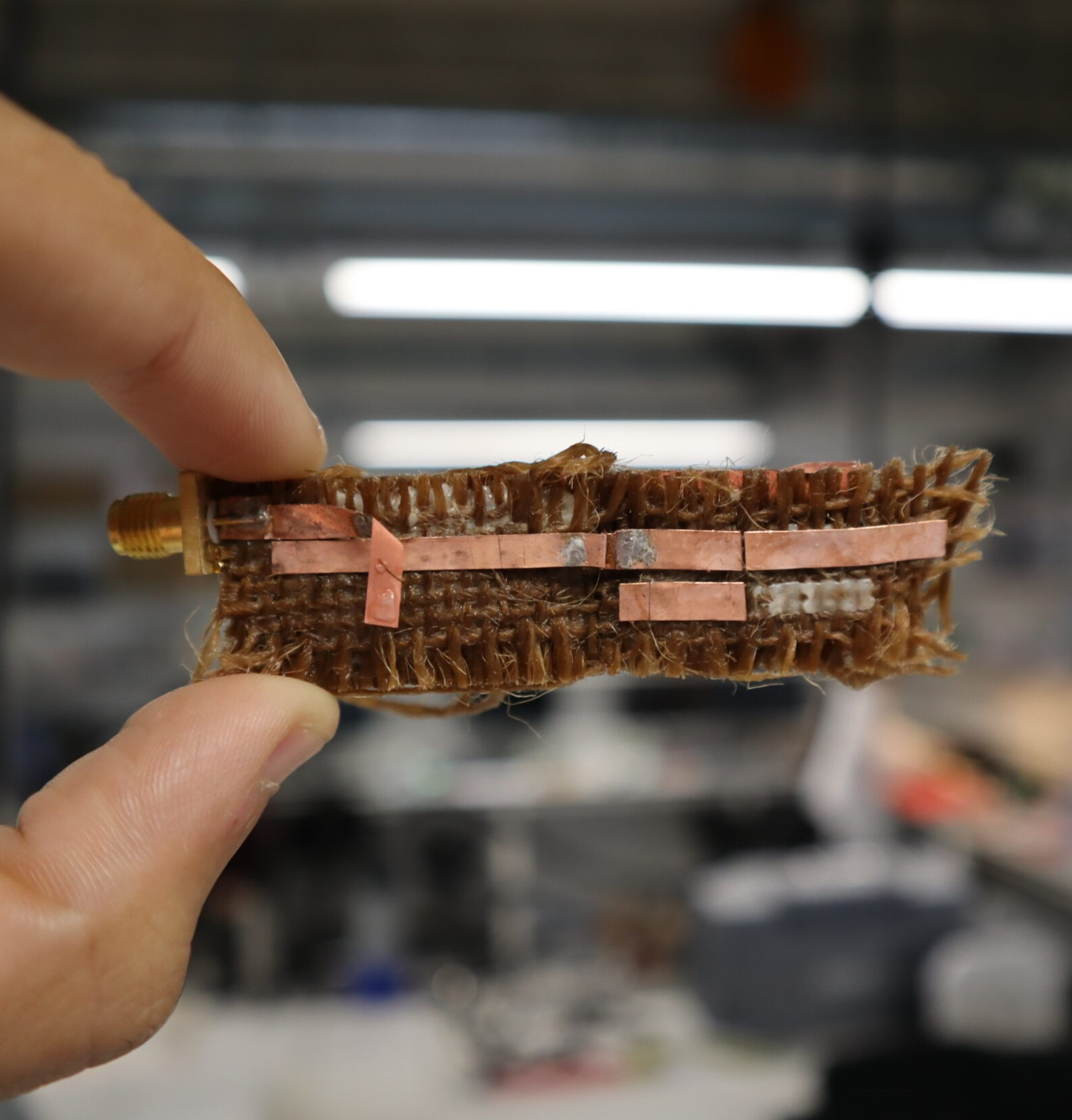
A biodegradable RF printed circuit board (PCB) at its end of life showing the fibres after dissolving the resin

== Biodegradable electronic textiles ==
Biodegradable electronic textiles (e-textiles) are a class of wearable electronics designed with components that naturally decompose in the environment. These textiles aim to reduce the environmental footprint of conventional e-textiles, which contribute to growing electronic and textile waste due to their complex material compositions.

Researchers at the University of the West of England (UWE) developed sustainable alternatives through the SWEET project ("Sustainable, Wearable, and ECO-Friendly Electronic Textiles"). They produced biodegradable EKG heart monitors and temperature sensors using materials like graphene and PEDOT:PSS. Life Cycle Assessment shows that graphene-based electrodes have an environmental impact 40 times lower than industry-standard electrodes. Devices were buried in soil for one and four months to assess degradation, including weight loss, microbial growth, and tensile strength. Results showed approximately 50% weight loss over four months, 98% loss of strength, with microbial activity comparable to control samples.

At Cornell University, researchers developed "Eco-Threads," a set of biodegradable prototypes including a pH-sensing undergarment, touch sensors, woven heat-responsive lunch containers, and knitted cooling gels. These were fabricated using thread-based methods like wet spinning and coating, incorporating biodegradable conductive materials such as carbon nanotubes, silver nanowires, activated charcoal, and PEDOT:PSS. A co-design workshop with e-textile practitioners produced further innovations, including a stretch sensor, crochet sensor, and pH-sensing picnic blanket.
