= Triphenylamine =

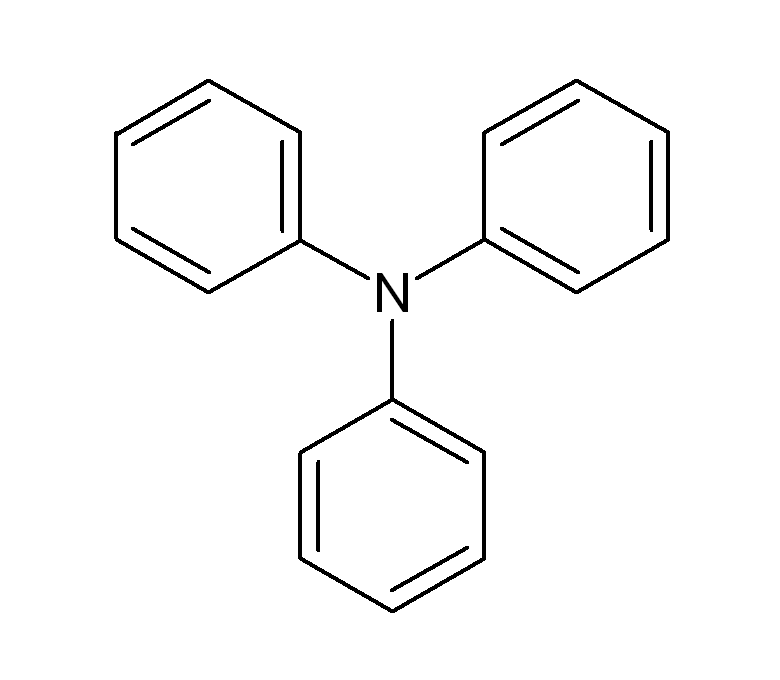

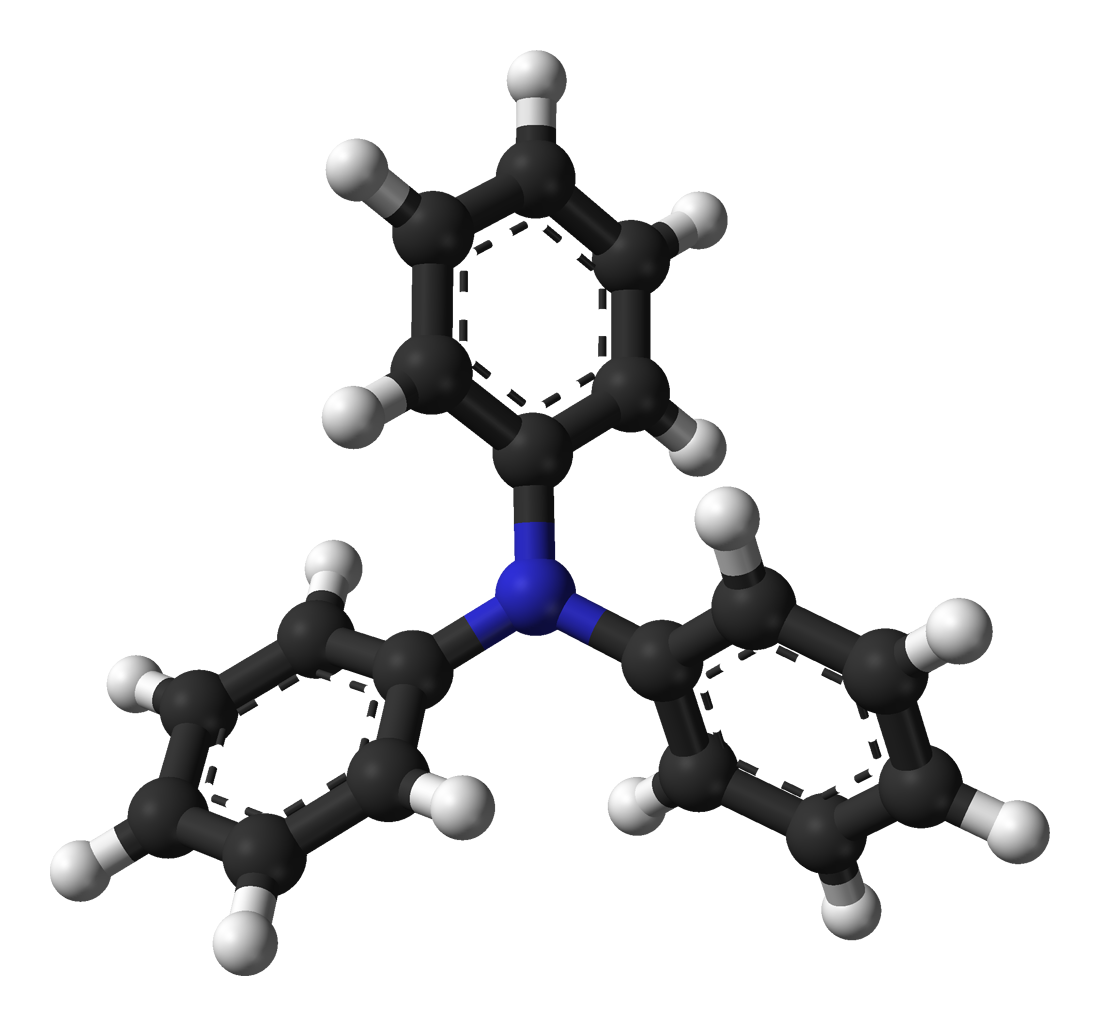

Names
- Preferred IUPAC name N,N-Diphenylaniline
- Other names Triphenylamine; N,N,N-Triphenylamine; N,N-Diphenylbenzeneamine

Identifiers
CAS Number	603-34-9
3D model (JSmol)	Interactive image
Abbreviations	TPA; Ph_{3}N
ChemSpider	11282
ECHA InfoCard	100.009.123
EC Number	210-035-5
PubChem CID	11775
RTECS number	YK2680000
UNII	NJS65M2DS2
CompTox Dashboard (EPA)	DTXSID4022076
- InChI: InChI=1S/C18H15N/c1-4-10-16(11-5-1)19(17-12-6-2-7-13-17)18-14-8-3-9-15-18/h1-15H Key: ODHXBMXNKOYIBV-UHFFFAOYSA-N; InChI=1/C18H15N/c1-4-10-16(11-5-1)19(17-12-6-2-7-13-17)18-14-8-3-9-15-18/h1-15H Key: ODHXBMXNKOYIBV-UHFFFAOYAF
- SMILES: c3c(N(c1ccccc1)c2ccccc2)cccc3

Properties
Chemical formula	C_{18}H_{15}N
Molar mass	245.325 g·mol^{−1}
Appearance	Off-white solid
Density	0.774 g/cm^{3}
Melting point	127 °C (261 °F; 400 K)
Boiling point	347 to 348 °C (657 to 658 °F; 620 to 621 K)
Solubility in water	Almost insoluble
log P	5.74

Hazards
- GHS labelling
Pictograms	(GHS07: Exclamation mark)
Signal word	Warning
Hazard statements	H315, H319
Precautionary statements	P264, P280, P302+P352, P305+P351+P338, P321, P332+P313, P337+P313, P362
Flash point	180 °C (356 °F; 453 K) open cup
- NIOSH (US health exposure limits)
PEL (Permissible)	none
REL (Recommended)	TWA 5 mg/m^{3}
IDLH (Immediate danger)	N.D.
- Except where otherwise noted, data are given for materials in their standard state (at 25 °C [77 °F], 100 kPa). verify (what is ?) Infobox references

Triphenylamine is an organic compound with formula (C_{6}H_{5})_{3}N. In contrast to most amines, triphenylamine is nonbasic. At room temperature it appears as a colorless crystalline solid, with monoclinic structure. It is well miscible in diethyl ether and benzene, but it is practically insoluble in water, and partially in ethanol. Its derivatives have useful properties in electrical conductivity and electroluminescence, and they are used in OLEDs as hole-transporters.

Triphenylamine can be prepared by Ullmann arylation of diphenylamine.

== Chemical properties ==
Triphenylamine has three aromatic groups directly linked to the central nitrogen atom. Each aromatic group acts as an electron attractor, directing the electron cloud of the lone pair of nitrogen towards it. With the delocalization of the nitrogen lone pair, a partial positive charge is conferred to nitrogen, counterbalanced by the partial negative charge localized on the aromatic groups. This arrangement hinders nitrogen protonation, rendering triphenylamine an extremely weak base.

From this characteristic, moreover, it follows that the three N-C bonds all lie in the same plane and that they are located at 120° from each other, which is not the case with aliphatic amines and ammonia, where the orbitals of nitrogen are arranged in a tetrahedron. Due to steric hindrance, the phenyl groups are not on the same plane defined by the three N-C bonds, but are twisted, giving the molecule its characteristic "propeller-like" shape.

== See also ==
- Triarylamine
- Triphenylphosphine
