= Iodine fluoride =

Iodine fluoride may refer to:

- Iodine monofluoride (iodine(I) fluoride), IF
- Iodine trifluoride (iodine(III) fluoride), IF_{3}
- Iodine pentafluoride (iodine(V) fluoride), IF_{5}
- Iodine heptafluoride (iodine(VII) fluoride), IF_{7}
