= Go-box =

Go-box is a name used for a number of electronic devices.

The "Go-Box" is often a box, crate, carry-case, modified briefcase or similar construction containing electronic equipment pre-setup and ready to function. The box can then be taken into the field or placed at a remote site with minimal effort. These are often used by radio amateurs (or "Hams") for emergency communications, experimental work, or field communications. This has also led to similar equipment being used in the Emergency Services, utility companies, military, and government agencies.

A search of the YouTube website can reveal a number of ideas for these devices mostly built by people at home.

Terms created after the use of "go-box" include the "go-bag" which is an 'essentials' bag of items needed for evacuations or quick departures, i.e. medicines, clothes, torch, broadcast radio receiver, batteries, etc.

In Austria it is a radio transmitter used in trucks as part of the Videomaut toll collection system.

One use of the term in the United States is a device which is supposed to change traffic signals from red to green. U.S. Fire trucks have a similar device, called an Opticom, that uses an infrared beam. Two residents of Miami, Florida, were arrested for selling fake go-boxes online. Several hundred were sold, prices ranging from $69 to $150. In reality, the boxes contained nothing more than strobe lights.
