= Tris(4-bromophenyl)ammoniumyl hexachloroantimonate =

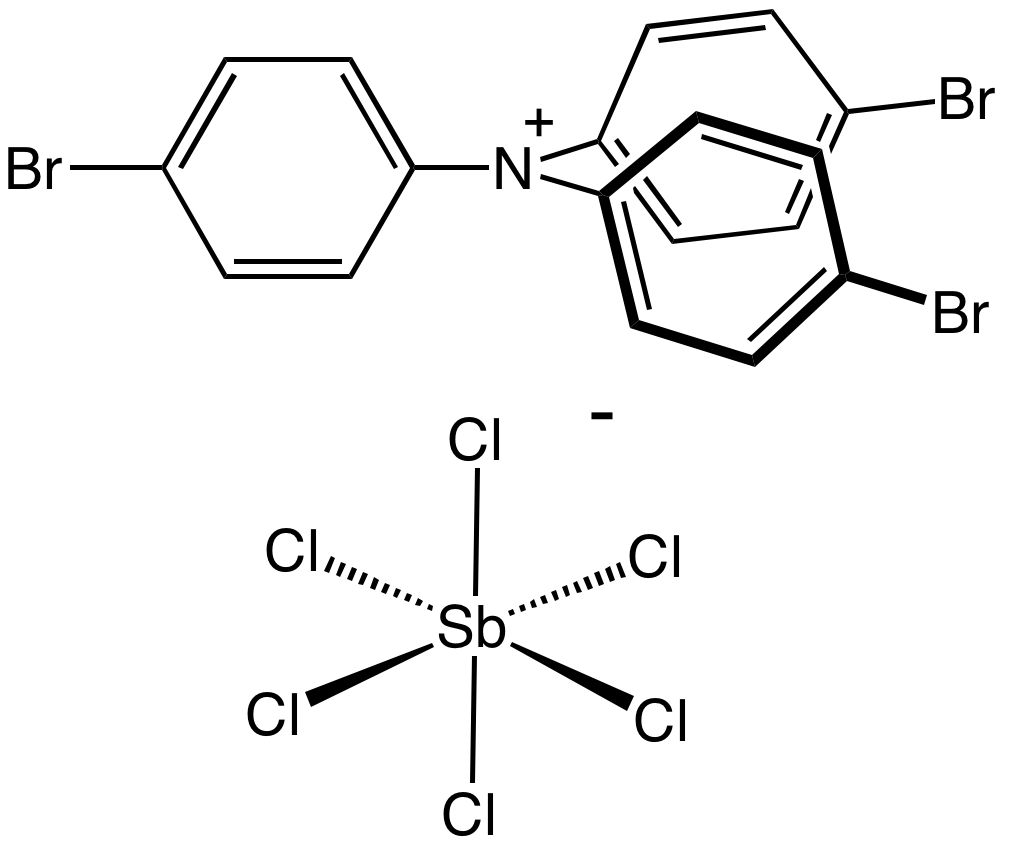

Identifiers
CAS Number	24964-91-8 salt; 37881-41-7 cation
3D model (JSmol)	Interactive image
ChemSpider	21493919
PubChem CID	16688313
- InChI: InChI=1S/C18H12Br3N.6ClH.Sb/c19-13-1-7-16(8-2-13)22(17-9-3-14(20)4-10-17)18-11-5-15(21)6-12-18;;;;;;;/h1-12H;6*1H;/q+1;;;;;;;+5/p-6 Key: SDHBPVANTRLAKE-UHFFFAOYSA-H
- SMILES: C1=CC(=CC=C1[N+](C2=CC=C(C=C2)Br)C3=CC=C(C=C3)Br)Br.Cl[Sb-](Cl)(Cl)(Cl)(Cl)Cl

Properties
Chemical formula	[(p-BrC_{6}H_{4})_{3}N•]^{+}[SbCl_{6}]^{−}
Molar mass	816.47 g·mol^{−1}
Appearance	blue solid
Melting point	141 to 142 °C (286 to 288 °F; 414 to 415 K)
Solubility in water	acetonitrile
- Except where otherwise noted, data are given for materials in their standard state (at 25 °C [77 °F], 100 kPa). Infobox references

Tris(4-bromophenyl)ammoniumyl hexachloroantimonate is the organic compound with the formula [(4-BrC_{6}H_{4})_{3}N]SbCl_{6}. Commonly known as magic blue, it is the hexachloroantimonate salt of an amine radical cation. It is a blue solid that reacts with many solvents but is soluble in acetonitrile. The compound is a popular oxidizing agent in organic and organometallic chemistry, with a reduction potential of 0.67 V versus ferrocene/ferrocenium (acetonitrile solution) or 0.70 V versus ferrocene/ferrocenium (dichloromethane solution).

The structure of the cation consists of a three-bladed propeller structure with a planar amine. It is nearly identical to the parent triphenylamine. The weakly coordinating anion is SbCl^{−}_{6}, which is octahedral.

== Related compounds ==
- Magic green, tris(2,4-dibromophenyl)ammoniumyl hexachloroantimonate
