= Electron donor =

Chemical entity capable of donating electrons to another entity

In chemistry, an electron donor is a chemical entity that transfers electrons to another compound. It is a reducing agent that, by virtue of its donating electrons, is itself oxidized in the process. An obsolete definition equated an electron donor and a Lewis base.

In contrast to traditional reducing agents, electron transfer from a donor to an electron acceptor may be only fractional. The electron is not completely transferred, which results in an electron resonance between the donor and acceptor. This leads to the formation of charge transfer complexes, in which the components largely retain their chemical identities. The electron donating power of a donor molecule is measured by its ionization potential, which is the energy required to remove an electron from the highest occupied molecular orbital (HOMO).

The overall energy balance (ΔE), i.e., energy gained or lost, in an electron donor-acceptor transfer is determined by the difference between the acceptor's electron affinity (A) and the ionization potential (I):

$${\Delta}E=A-I\,$$

== Molecular electronics and devices ==
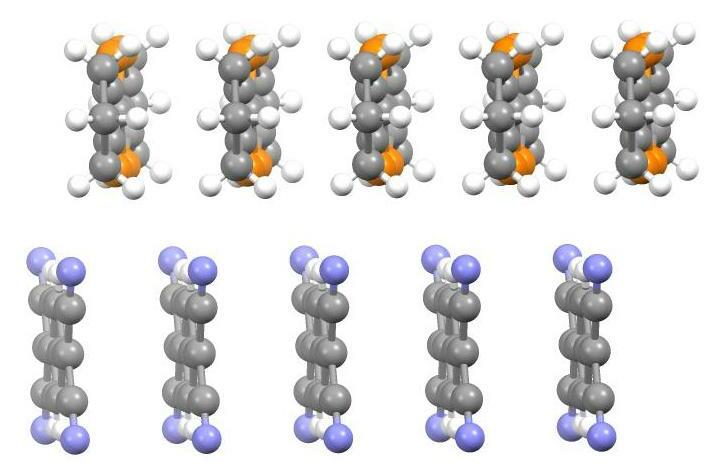
Edge-on view of portion of crystal structure of hexamethyleneTTF/TCNQ charge transfer salt, highlighting the segregated stacking. HexamethyleneTTF, featuring tetrathiafulvalene, is an iconic electron donor in this electron donor-acceptor material.

Electron donors are components of many devices such as organic photovoltaic devices. Typical electron donors undergo reversible redox so that they can serve as electron relays. Triarylamines are typical donors.

== In biology ==
NADH is an example of a natural electron donor. Ascorbic acid is another example. It is a water-soluble antioxidant.

In biology, electron donors release an electron during cellular respiration, resulting in the release of energy. Microorganisms, such as bacteria, obtain energy in electron transfer processes. Through its cellular machinery, the microorganism collects the energy for its use. The final result of this process (electron transport chain) is an electron being donated to an electron acceptor. Petroleum hydrocarbons, less chlorinated solvents like vinyl chloride, soil organic matter, and reduced inorganic compounds are all compounds that can act as electron donors. These reactions are of interest not only because they allow organisms to obtain energy, but also because they are involved in the natural biodegradation of organic contaminants. When clean-up professionals use monitored natural attenuation to clean up contaminated sites, biodegradation is one of the major contributing processes.

== See also ==
- Semiconductor
- Donor (semiconductors)
