= Bromine fluoride =

Bromine fluoride may refer to:

- Bromine monofluoride, BrF
- Bromine trifluoride, BrF_{3}
- Bromine pentafluoride, BrF_{5}
