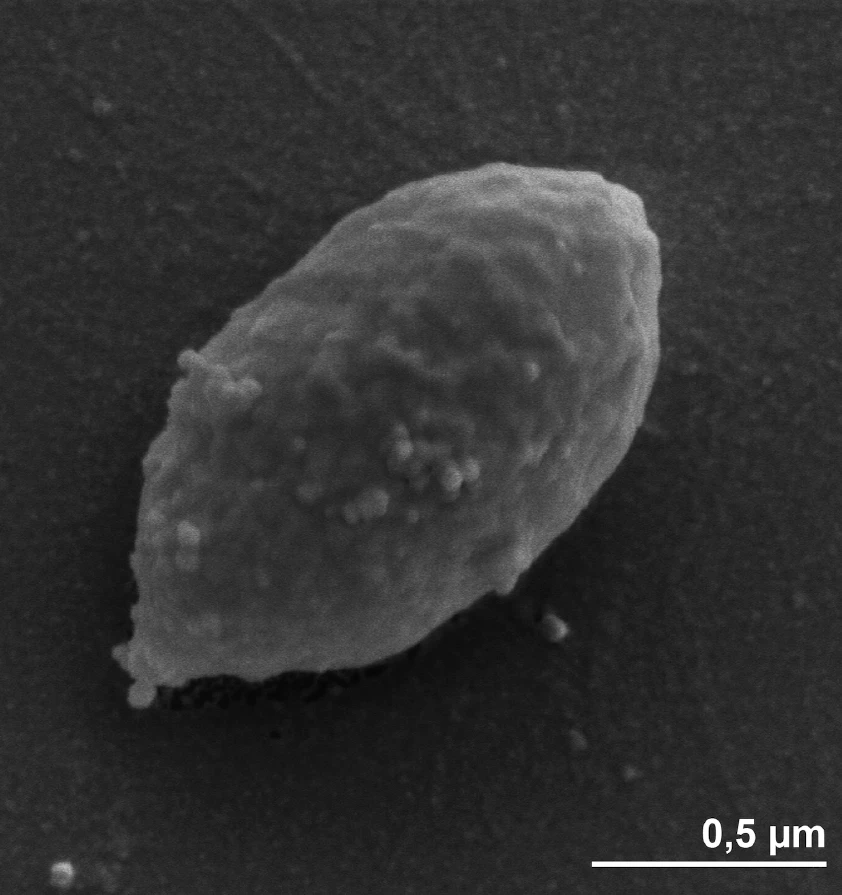
- Desulfobulbus propionicus type strain 1pr3T

Scientific classification
- Domain: Bacteria
- Kingdom: Pseudomonadati
- Phylum: Thermodesulfobacteriota
- Class: Desulfobulbia
- Order: Desulfobulbales
- Family: Desulfobulbaceae; Kuever et al. 2006

Genera
- Desulfobulbus; Desulfocastanea; Desulfogranum; Desulfolithobacter; Desulfomarina; Desulfoprunum; Desulfurivibrio; Hydrosulfovibrio; "Ca. Desulfatifera"; "Ca. Desulfobia"; "Ca. Electronema"; "Ca. Electrothrix"

= Desulfobulbaceae =

Family of bacteria

The Desulfobulbaceae are a family of Thermodesulfobacteriota. They reduce sulphates to sulphides to obtain energy and are anaerobic. Certain strains are also capable of Microbial Sulfur Disproportionation (MSD) or iron respiration. Most Desulfobulbaceae are mesophilic bacteria, but some are psychrophiles or alkaliphiles. They live in marine, brackish, or freshwater habitats.

== Cable bacteria ==
The discovery of filamentous Desulfobulbaceae in 2012 elucidates the cause of the small electric currents measured in the top layer of marine sediment. The currents were first measured in 2010. These organisms, referred to as "cable bacteria", consist in thousands of cells arranged in filaments up to three centimeters in length. They transport electrons from the sediment that is rich in hydrogen sulfide up to the oxygen-rich sediment that is in contact with the water. Later investigations revealed their ability to use nitrate or nitrite as final electron acceptor in absence of oxygen Since the discovery, cable bacteria have been reported from a wide variety of sediments worldwide. Based on phylogenetic analysis of 16s rRNA and dsrAB genes it was proposed to allocate cable bacteria within two novel candidate genera i.e. Ca. Electrothrix and Ca. Electronema.

== Phylogeny ==
The currently accepted taxonomy is based on the List of Prokaryotic names with Standing in Nomenclature (LPSN) and National Center for Biotechnology Information (NCBI).

16S rRNA based LTP_10_2024

- Desulfobulbaceae
  - Desulfolithobacter
  - - Desulfobulbus
    - Desulfogranum

120 marker proteins based GTDB 10-RS226

- Desulfobulbaceae
  - Desulfolithobacter Hashimoto et al. 2023
  - - - "Ca. Desulfobulbus rimicarensis" Jiang et al. 2020
      - - "Ca. Electrothrix" Trojan et al. 2016
        - "Ca. Electronema" Trojan et al. 2016
    - - Desulfobulbus Widdel 1981
      - Desulfogranum Galushko & Kuever 2021

== See also ==
- List of bacterial orders
- List of bacteria genera
