= Disproportionation =

Redox reaction whose products have higher and lower oxidation states than the reactant

In chemistry, disproportionation, sometimes called dismutation (the French word), is a redox reaction in which one compound of intermediate oxidation state converts to two compounds, one of higher and one of lower oxidation state. The reverse of disproportionation, such as when a compound in an intermediate oxidation state is formed from precursors of lower and higher oxidation states, is called comproportionation, also known as symproportionation.

More generally, the term can be applied to any desymmetrizing reaction where two molecules of one type react to give one each of two different types:

2 A → A' + A"

This expanded definition is not limited to redox reactions, but also includes some molecular autoionization reactions, such as the self-ionization of water. In contrast, some authors use the term redistribution to refer to reactions of this type (in either direction) when only ligand exchange but no redox is involved and distinguish such processes from disproportionation and comproportionation. For example, the Schlenk equilibrium

2 RMgX → R_{2}Mg + MgX_{2}

is an example of a redistribution reaction.

== History ==
The first disproportionation reaction to be studied in detail was:

2 Sn^{2+} → Sn^{4+} + Sn

This was examined using tartrates by Johan Gadolin in 1788. In the Swedish version of his paper he called it söndring (lit. 'division').

== Examples ==
- Mercury(I) chloride disproportionates upon irradiation with ultraviolet light:
  Hg_{2}Cl_{2} → HgCl_{2} + Hg
- Phosphorous acid disproportionates upon heating to 200 °C to give phosphoric acid and phosphine:
  4 H_{3}PO_{3} → 3 H_{3}PO_{4} + PH_{3}
- Desymmetrizing reactions are sometimes referred to as disproportionation, as illustrated by the thermal degradation of bicarbonate:
  2 HCO^{−}_{3} → CO^{2−}_{3} + H_{2}CO_{3}
  The oxidation numbers remain constant in this acid-base reaction.
- Another variant on disproportionation is radical disproportionation, in which two radicals form an alkene and an alkane.
  $$\ce{2CH3-\underset{^\bullet}CH2 -> {H2C=CH2} + H3C-CH3}$$
- Disproportionation of sulfur intermediates by microorganisms is widely observed in sediments.
  4 S^{0} + 4 H_{2}O → 3 H_{2}S + SO^{2−}_{4} + 2 H^{+}
  3 S^{0} + 2 FeOOH → SO^{2−}_{4} + 2 FeS + 2 H^{+}
  4 SO^{2−}_{3} + 2 H^{+} → H_{2}S + SO^{2−}_{4}
- Chlorine gas reacts with concentrated sodium hydroxide to form sodium chloride, sodium chlorate and water. The ionic equation for this reaction is as follows:
  3 Cl_{2} + 6 OH^{−} → 5 Cl^{−} + ClO^{−}_{3} + 3 H_{2}O
  The chlorine reactant is in oxidation state 0. In the products, the chlorine in the Cl^{−} ion has an oxidation number of −1, having been reduced, whereas the oxidation number of the chlorine in the ClO^{−}_{3} ion is +5, indicating that it has been oxidized.
- Decomposition of numerous interhalogen compounds involve disproportionation. Bromine fluoride undergoes a disproportionation reaction to form bromine trifluoride and bromine in non-aqueous media:
  3 BrF → BrF_{3} + Br_{2}
- The dismutation of superoxide free radical to hydrogen peroxide and oxygen, catalysed in living systems by the enzyme superoxide dismutase:
  2 O^{−}_{2} + 2 H^{+} → H_{2}O_{2} + O_{2}
  The oxidation state of oxygen is −1/2 in the superoxide free radical anion, −1 in hydrogen peroxide and 0 in dioxygen.
- In the Cannizzaro reaction, an aldehyde is converted into an alcohol and a carboxylic acid. In the related Tishchenko reaction, the organic redox reaction product is the corresponding ester. In the Kornblum–DeLaMare rearrangement, a peroxide is converted to a ketone and an alcohol.
- The disproportionation of hydrogen peroxide into water and oxygen catalysed by either potassium iodide or the enzyme catalase:
  2 H_{2}O_{2} → 2 H_{2}O + O_{2}
- In the Boudouard reaction, carbon monoxide disproportionates to carbon and carbon dioxide. The reaction is for example used in the HiPco method for producing carbon nanotubes; high-pressure carbon monoxide disproportionates when catalysed on the surface of an iron particle:
  2 CO → C + CO_{2}
- Nitrogen has oxidation state +4 in nitrogen dioxide, but when this compound reacts with water, it forms both nitric acid and nitrous acid, where nitrogen has oxidation states +5 and +3 respectively:
  2 NO_{2} + H_{2}O → HNO_{3} + HNO_{2}
- In hydrazoic acid and sodium azide, each of the 3 nitrogen atoms of these very energetic linear polyatomic species has an oxidation state of −1/3. These unstable and highly toxic compounds will disproportionate in aqueous solution to form gaseous nitrogen (N_{2}) and ammonium ions, or ammonia, depending on pH conditions, as it can be conveniently verified by means of the Frost diagram for nitrogen: Under acidic conditions, hydrazoic acid disproportionates as:
  3 HN_{3} + H^{+} → 4 N_{2} + NH^{+}_{4}
  Under neutral, or basic, conditions, the azide anion disproportionates as:
  3 N^{−}_{3} + 3 H_{2}O → 4 N_{2} + NH_{3} + 3 OH^{−}
- Dithionite undergoes acid hydrolysis to thiosulfate and bisulfite:
  2 S_{2}O^{2−}_{4} + H_{2}O → S_{2}O^{2−}_{3} + 2 HSO^{−}_{3}
- Dithionite also undergoes alkaline hydrolysis to sulfite and sulfide:
  3 Na_{2}S_{2}O_{4} + 6 NaOH → 5 Na_{2}SO_{3} + Na_{2}S + 3 H_{2}O
- Dithionate is prepared on a larger scale by oxidizing a cooled aqueous solution of sulfur dioxide with manganese dioxide:
  2 MnO_{2} + 3 SO_{2} → MnS_{2}O_{6} + MnSO_{4}

== Polymer chemistry ==
In free-radical chain-growth polymerization, chain termination can occur by a disproportionation step in which a hydrogen atom is transferred from one growing chain molecule to another one, which produces two dead (non-growing) chains.

in which Chain— represents the already formed polymer chain, and ^{•} indicates a reactive free radical.

== Biochemistry ==
In 1937, Hans Adolf Krebs, who discovered the citric acid cycle bearing his name, confirmed the anaerobic dismutation of pyruvic acid into lactic acid, acetic acid, and CO_{2}, by certain bacteria according to the global reaction:

2 CH_{3}COCOOH + H_{2}O → CH_{3}CH(OH)COOH + CH_{3}COOH + CO_{2}

The dismutation of pyruvic acid into other small organic molecules (ethanol + CO_{2}, or lactate and acetate, depending on the environmental conditions) is also a key step in fermentation reactions. Fermentation reactions can also be considered as disproportionation or dismutation biochemical reactions. Indeed, the donor and acceptor of electrons in the redox reactions supplying the chemical energy in these complex biochemical systems are the same organic molecules simultaneously acting as reductant or oxidant.

Another example of biochemical dismutation reaction is the disproportionation of acetaldehyde into ethanol and acetic acid.

In cellular respiration, electrons are transferred from substrate (electron donor) to an electron acceptor; in fermentation, part of the substrate molecule itself accepts the electrons. Fermentation is therefore a type of disproportionation, and does not involve an overall change in oxidation state of the substrate. Most of the fermentative substrates are organic molecules.

=== Disproportionation of sulfur intermediates ===
Another example is microbial sulfur disproportionation (MSD), a type of energy metabolism involving the disproportionation of inorganic sulfur compounds, that exists often alongside reduction of sulfate in certain bacteria.

Sulfur isotopes of sediments are often measured for studying environments in the Earth's past (paleoenvironment). Disproportionation of sulfur intermediates, being one of the processes affecting sulfur isotopes of sediments, has drawn attention from geoscientists for studying the redox conditions in the oceans in the past.

Sulfate-reducing bacteria fractionate sulfur isotopes as they take in sulfate and produce sulfide. Prior to 2010s, it was thought that sulfate reduction could fractionate sulfur isotopes up to 46‰ and fractionation larger than 46‰ recorded in sediments must be due to disproportionation of sulfur intermediates in the sediment. This view has changed since the 2010s. As substrates for disproportionation are limited by the product of sulfate reduction, the isotopic effect of disproportionation should be less than 16‰ in most sedimentary settings.

Disproportionation can be carried out by obligate disproportionators or, more often, by microorganisms that can carry out sulfate reduction or sulfur oxidation as well. Common substrates for disproportionation include elemental sulfur (S_{8}), thiosulfate (S_{2}O^{2−}_{3}) and sulfite (SO^{2−}_{3}).

== See also ==
- Dismutase
- Oxidoreductase
- Fermentation (biochemistry)
