= Desulfocapsaceae =

Scientific classification
- Domain: Bacteria
- Kingdom: Pseudomonadati
- Phylum: Thermodesulfobacteriota
- Class: Desulfobulbia
- Order: Desulfobulbales
- Family: Desulfocapsaceae; Waite et al. 2020

Genera
- "Ca. Desulfatifera"; Desulfocapsa; Desulfocastanea; Desulfofustis; Desulfomarina; Desulfopila; Desulfoprunum; Desulforhopalus; Desulfosediminicola; Desulfotalea

Family of bacteria

The Desulfocapsaceae are a family of Thermodesulfobacteriota.

== Phylogeny ==
The currently accepted taxonomy is based on the List of Prokaryotic names with Standing in Nomenclature (LPSN) and National Center for Biotechnology Information (NCBI).

16S rRNA based LTP_10_2024

- Desulfocapsaceae
  - Desulfoprunum Junghare & Schink 2015
  - - - Desulfofustis Friedrich et al. 1996
      - Desulfocapsa Janssen et al. 1997
    - - Desulfopila inferna
      - - - Desulfocastanea Galushko & Kuever 2021
          - - Desulfomarina Hashimoto et al. 2021
            - Desulforhopalus Isaksen & Teske 1999
        - - - Desulfosediminicola flagellatus
            - Desulfopila Suzuki et al. 2007
          - - Desulfosediminicola Song et al. 2023
            - Desulfotalea Knoblauch, Sahm & Jorgensen 1999

120 marker proteins based GTDB 10-RS226

- Desulfocapsaceae
  - - "Ca. Desulfatifera" Van Vliet et al. 2020
    - Desulfocapsa
  - - Desulfofustis
    - - Desulfopila inferna
      - - Desulfoprunum
        - - Desulfopila [incl. Desulfosediminicola]
          - - Desulfotalea
            - - Desulfomarina
              - Desulforhopalus

== See also ==
- List of bacterial orders
- List of bacteria genera
