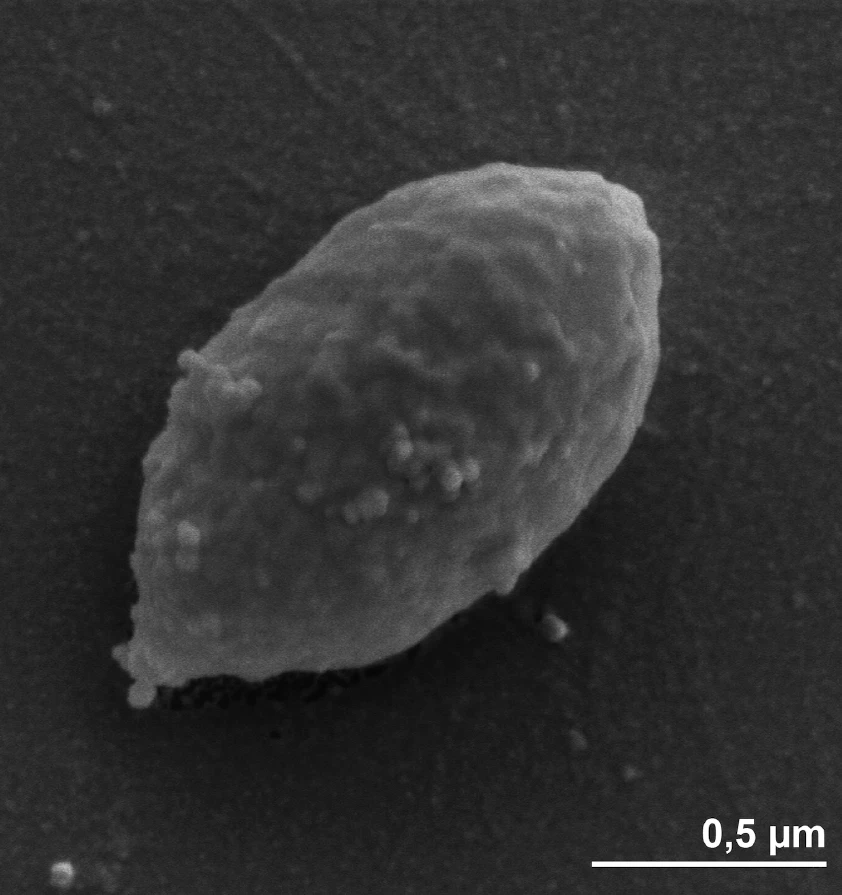
- Desulfobulbus propionicus type strain 1pr3T

Scientific classification
- Domain: Bacteria
- Kingdom: Pseudomonadati
- Phylum: Thermodesulfobacteriota
- Class: Desulfobulbia; Waite et al. 2020
- Order: Desulfobulbales; Waite et al. 2020

Families
- Desulfobulbaceae; Desulfocapsaceae; Desulfurivibrionaceae

= Desulfobulbales =

Order of bacteria

The Desulfobulbales are an order of anaerobic bacteria within the phylum Thermodesulfobacteriota. It is the only order in the class Desulfobulbia. The order Desulfobulbales contains several lineages of bacteria capable of sulfur oxidation.

== Phylogeny ==
The currently accepted taxonomy is based on the List of Prokaryotic names with Standing in Nomenclature (LPSN) and National Center for Biotechnology Information (NCBI).

16S rRNA based LTP_10_2024

- Desulfobulbales
  - - Desulfurivibrionaceae
    - Desulfobulbaceae
  - Desulfocapsaceae

120 marker proteins based GTDB 10-RS226

- Desulfobulbales
  - - "Ca. Desulfobia" Van Vliet et al. 2020 {SURF-16}
    - Desulfurivibrionaceae Waite et al. 2020 [incl. Thiovibrionaceae]
  - - Desulfocapsaceae Waite et al. 2020
    - Desulfobulbaceae Kuever, Rainey & Widdel 2006

== See also ==
- List of bacterial orders
- List of bacteria genera
