= Yudomski Event =

Period of high sulfur isotopic values

The Yudomski event is a proposed global event that occurred during the Cambrian period based on deposits showing unusually elevated levels of heavy sulfur isotopes. The distribution of sulfur isotopes is sensitive to biological and geological processes that can selectively enrich for heavier or lighter isotopes, allowing for reconstruction of changes to the sulfur cycle. In the case of the Yudomski event the proposed change is "catastrophic" mixing of heavy sulfur enriched deep ocean brines with ocean surface waters.

== Study ==
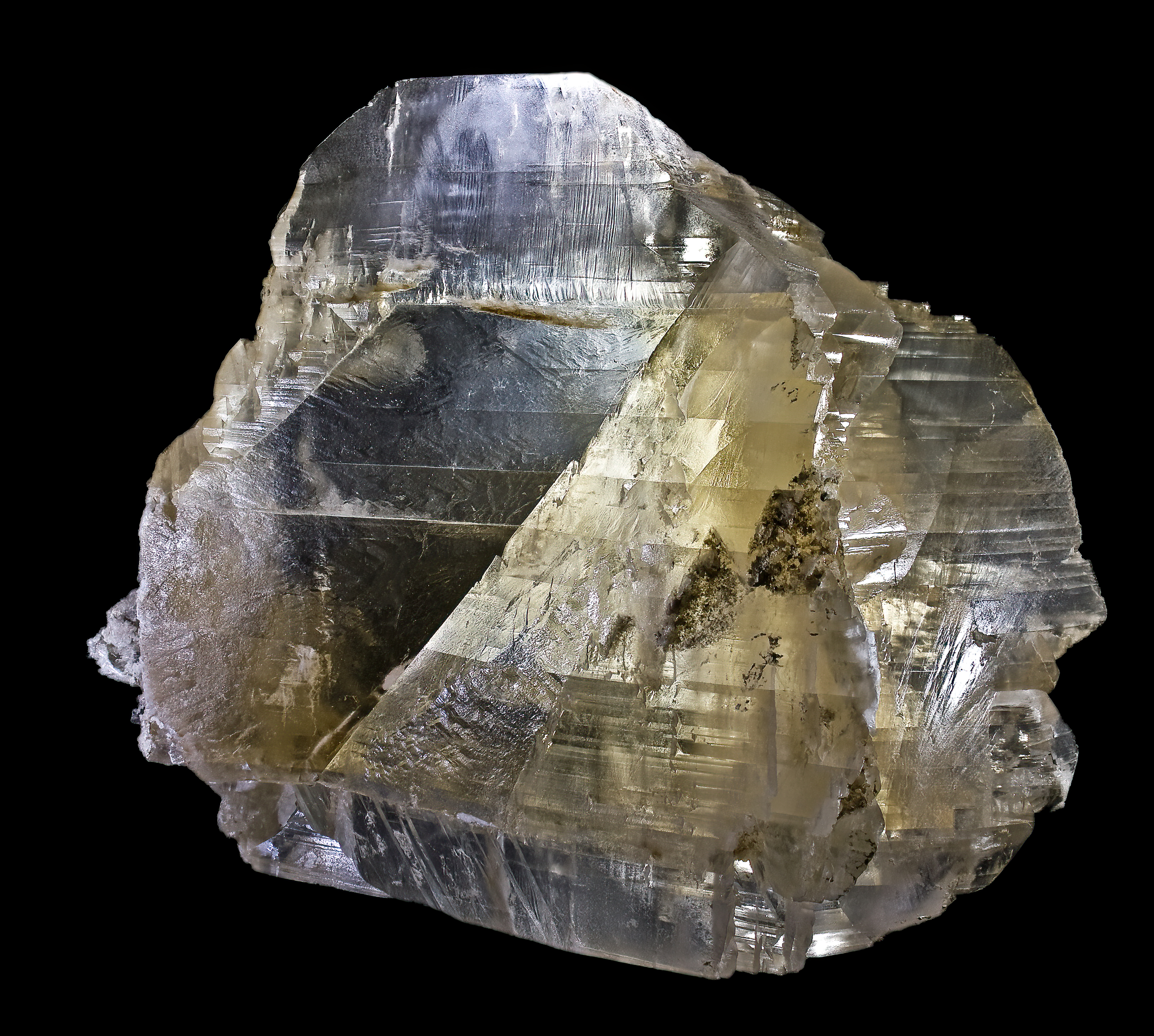
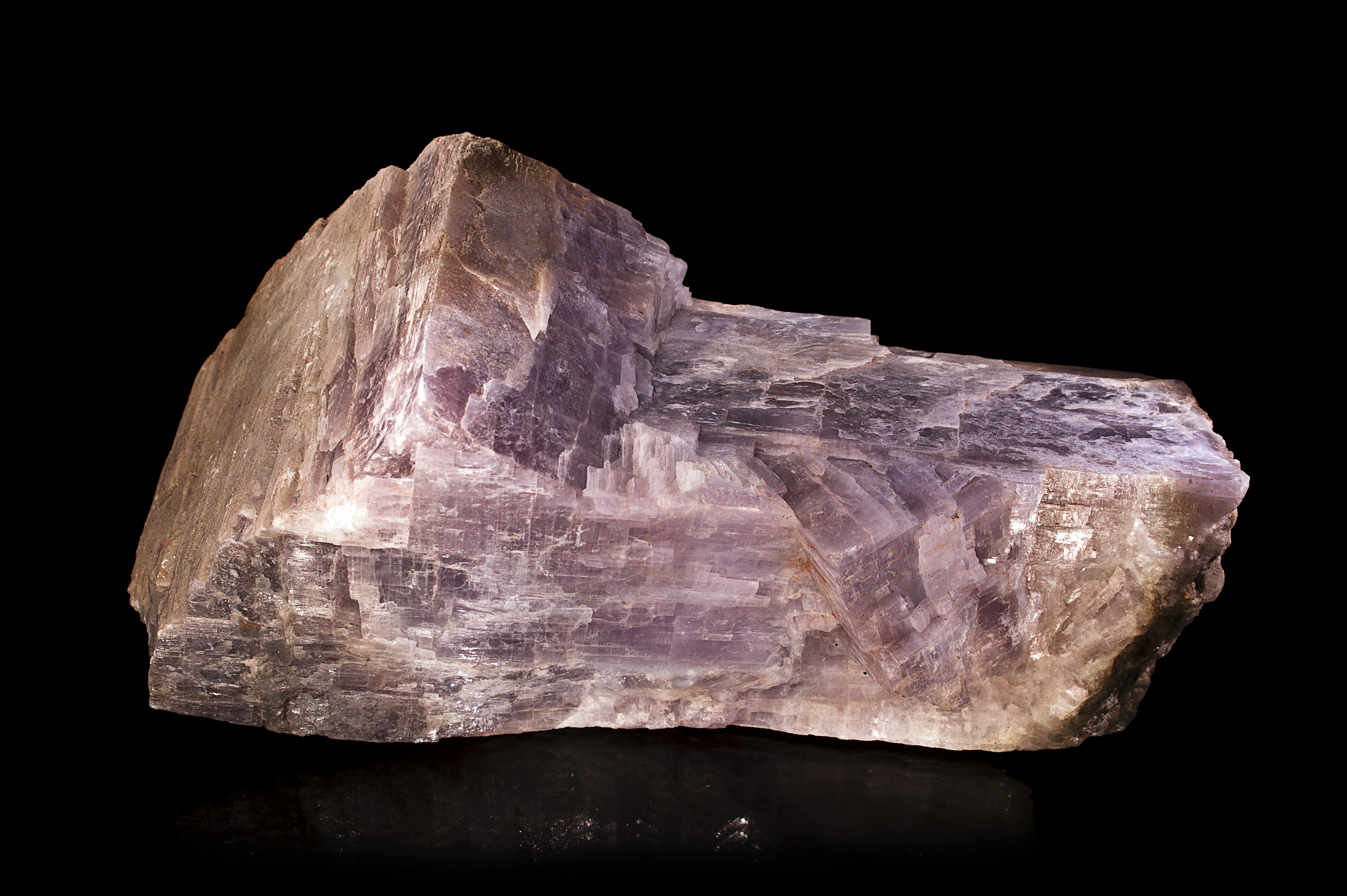
Examples of evaporitic sulfates; gypsum (left) and anhydrite (right). These are important as they record the isotopes of sulfur in seawater.

The ancient record of sulfur isotopes that on seawater is recorded by evaporitic sulfates such as gypsum and anhydrite. The Yudomski event was first proposed by (Holster, 1977) to explain the sharp rise in ^{34}S and the deposits. There is a possibility that the sharp excursion of ^{34}S is incorrect. It is proposed that these high ^{34}S values can be obtained through lattice sulfates in francolites and in baritic black cherts.

== Units ==
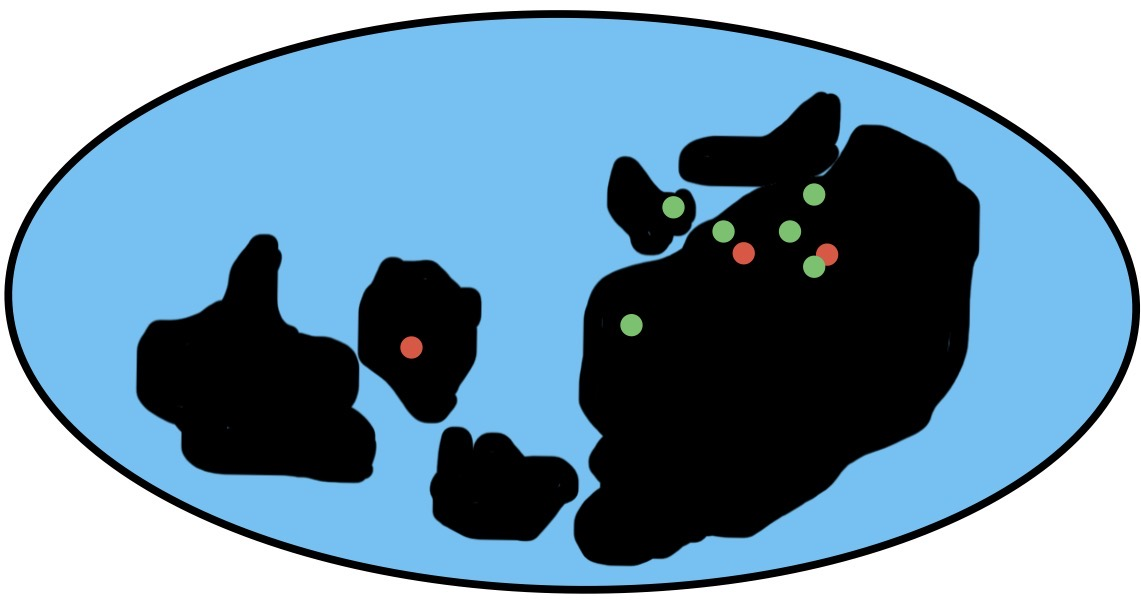
Paleogeographic reconstruction of the Earth during the early Cambrian period. The red circles represent evaporite deposits while the green represents phosphates.

Evaporate deposits that have been dated to the latest Precambrian and Cambrian periods occur extensively in Siberia and the northern margin of Gondwana. However levels of ^{34}S during the middle Proterozoic stayed less than 20%. During the late Proterozoic, these levels gradually increased before culminating in a maximum during the early and middle Cambrian period.

Sulfate evaporate deposites dated to around the early and middle Cambrian period can be found in Russia (Siberia), Iran, Australia, northwestern India and the Tarim Basin (northwestern China). A major unit of deposited dated to this time is the Hormuz Salt Formation located in Iran and around the Persian Gulf. It is a 3,000-meter thick deposit of interbedded evaporates, marine sediments, hydrocarbons and igneous rock. Also forming at around the same time is the Soltanieh formation located in the Salt Range Formation of Pakistan. It is a 2,000-meter thick deposit of evaporates.
