= Sulfur isotope biogeochemistry =

Sulfur isotope biogeochemistry is the study of the distribution of sulfur isotopes in biological and geological materials. In addition to its common isotope, ^{32}S, sulfur has three rare stable isotopes: ^{34}S, ^{36}S, and ^{33}S. The distribution of these isotopes in the environment is controlled by many biochemical and physical processes, including biological metabolisms, mineral formation processes, and atmospheric chemistry. Measuring the abundance of sulfur stable isotopes in natural materials, like bacterial cultures, minerals, or seawater, can reveal information about these processes both in the modern environment and over Earth history.

== Background ==
=== Natural abundance of sulfur isotopes ===
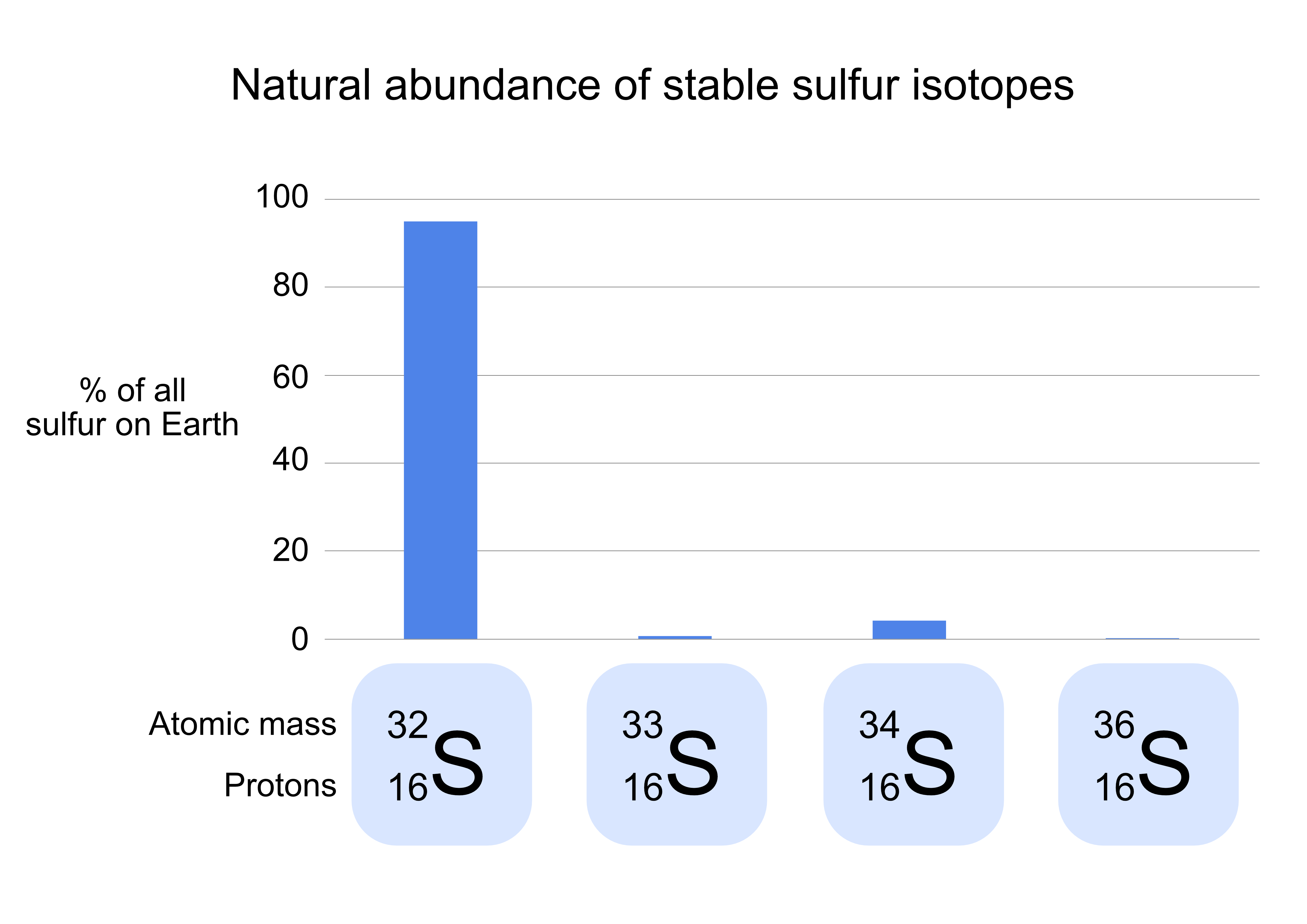
Bar chart depicting the natural abundance of ^{32}S, ^{33}S, ^{34}S, and ^{36}S on Earth.

Sulfur has 24 known isotopes, 4 of which are stable (meaning that they do not undergo radioactive decay). ^{32}S, the common isotope of sulfur, makes up 95.0% of the natural sulfur on Earth. In the atomic symbol of ^{32}S, the number 32 refers to the mass of each sulfur atom in daltons, the result of the 16 protons and 16 neutrons of 1 dalton each that make up the sulfur nucleus. The three rare stable isotopes of sulfur are ^{34}S (4.2% of natural sulfur), ^{33}S (0.75%), and ^{36}S (0.015%). These isotopes differ from ^{32}S in the number of neutrons in each atom, but not the number of protons or electrons; as a result, each isotope has a slightly different mass, but has nearly identical chemical properties.

=== Physical chemistry ===
Small differences in mass between stable isotopes of the same element can lead to a phenomenon called an "isotope effect," where heavier or lighter isotopes are preferentially incorporated into different natural materials depending on the materials' chemical composition or physical state. Isotope effects are divided into two main groups: kinetic isotope effects and equilibrium isotope effects. A kinetic isotope effect occurs when a reaction is irreversible, meaning that the reaction only proceeds in the direction from reactants to products. Kinetic isotope effects cause isotopic fractionation—meaning that they affect the isotopic composition of reactant and product compounds—because the mass differences between stable isotopes can affect the rate of chemical reactions. It takes more energy to reach the transition state of a reaction if the compound has bonds with a heavier isotope, which causes the compound with heavier isotopes to react more slowly. Normal kinetic isotope effects cause the lighter isotope (or isotopes) to be preferentially included in a reaction's product. The products are then said to be "depleted" in the heavy isotope relative to the reactant. Rarely, inverse kinetic isotope effects may occur, where the heavier isotope is preferentially included in a reaction's product.

Equilibrium isotope effects cause fractionation because it is more chemically favorable for heavy isotopes to take part in stronger bonds. An equilibrium isotope effect occurs when a reaction is at equilibrium, meaning that the reaction is able to occur in both directions simultaneously. When a reaction is at equilibrium, heavy isotopes will preferentially accumulate where they can form the strongest bonds. For example, when the water in a sealed, half-full bottle is in equilibrium with the vapor above it, the heavier isotopes ^{2}H and ^{18}O will accumulate in the liquid, where they form stronger bonds, while the lighter isotopes ^{1}H and ^{16}O will accumulate in the vapor. The liquid is then said to be "enriched" in the heavy isotope relative to the vapor.

== Calculations ==
=== Delta notation ===
Differences in the abundance of stable isotopes among natural materials are usually very small (natural differences in the ratio of rare to common isotope are almost always below 0.1%, and sometimes much smaller). Nevertheless, these very small differences can record meaningful biological and geological processes. To facilitate comparison of these small but meaningful differences, isotope abundances in natural materials are often reported relative to isotope abundances in designated standards. The convention for reporting the measured difference between a sample and a standard is called "delta notation." For example, imagine an element X for which we wish to compare the rare, heavy stable isotope with atomic mass A (^{A}X) to the light, common isotope with atomic mass B (^{B}X). The abundance of ^{A}X and ^{B}X in any given material is reported with the notation δ^{A}X. δ^{A}X for the sample material is calculated as follows:

^{A}R = (total amount of ^{A}X)/(total amount of ^{B}X)

δ^{A}X_{sample} = (^{A}R_{sample} − ^{A}R_{standard})/^{A}R_{standard}

δ values are most commonly reported in parts per thousand, commonly referred to in isotope chemistry as per mille and represented by the symbol ‰. To report δ values in per mille, the δ value as calculated above should be multiplied by 1000:

δ^{A}X_{sample} (‰) = ((^{A}R_{sample} − ^{A}R_{standard})/^{A}R_{standard}) * 1000

=== Fractionation factors ===
While an isotope effect is the physical tendency for stable isotopes to distribute in a particular way, the isotopic fractionation is the measurable result of this tendency. The isotopic fractionation of a natural process can be calculated from measured isotope abundances. The calculated value is called a "fractionation factor," and allows the effect of different processes on isotope distributions to be mathematically compared. For example, imagine a chemical reaction Reactant → Product. Reactant and Product are materials that both contain the element X, and X has two stable isotopes, ^{A}X (the heavy isotope, with a mass of A) and ^{B}X (the light isotope, with a mass of B). The fractionation factor for the element X in the reaction Reactant → Product is represented by the notation

^{A}α_{Product/Reactant}. ^{A}α_{Product/Reactant} is calculated as follows:

^{A}α_{Product/Reactant} = (δ^{A}X_{Product} + 1)/(δ^{A}X_{Reactant} + 1)

Fractionation factors can also be reported using the notation ^{A}ε_{Product/Reactant}, which is sometimes called the "enrichment factor" and is calculated as follows:

^{A}ε_{Product/Reactant} = ^{A}α_{Product/Reactant} − 1

Like δ values, ε values can be reported in per mille by multiplying by 1000.

=== Δ^{33}S and Δ^{36}S notation ===
All kinetic and equilibrium isotope effects result from differences in atomic mass. As a result, a reaction that fractionates ^{34}S will also fractionate ^{33}S and ^{36}S, and the fractionation factor for each isotope will be mathematically proportional to its mass. Because of the mathematical relationships of their masses, the observed relationships between δ^{34}S, δ^{33}S, and δ^{36}S in most natural materials are approximately δ^{33}S = 0.515 × δ^{34}S and δ^{36}S = 1.90 × δ^{34}S. Rarely, natural processes can create deviations from this relationship, and these deviations are reported as Δ^{33}S and Δ^{36}S values, usually pronounced as "cap delta." These values are typically calculated as follows:

Δ^{33}S = 1000 × [(1 + δ^{33}S/1000) − (1 + δ^{34}S 1000)^{0.518} − 1]

Δ^{36}S = 1000 × [(1 + δ^{36}S/1000) − (1 + δ^{34}S/1000)^{1.91} − 1]

However, the method for calculating Δ^{33}S and Δ^{36}S values is not standardized, and can differ among publications.

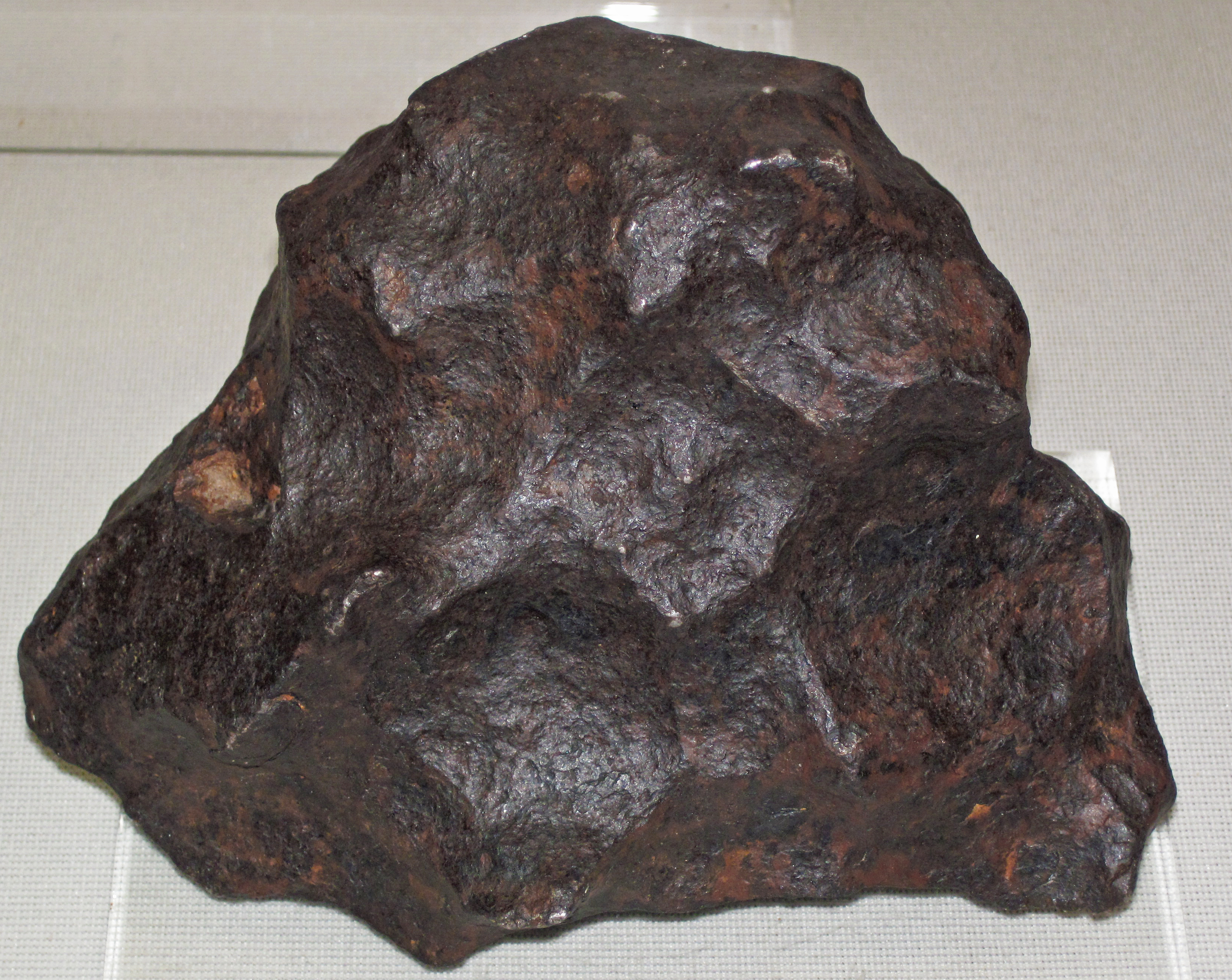
A Canyon Diablo meteorite sample. The original reference standard for measuring δ^{34}S was the mineral troilite (FeS) recovered from the Canyon Diablo meteorite.

=== Reference materials ===
Agreed-upon reference materials are required so that reported δ values are comparable among studies. For the sulfur isotope system, δ^{34}S values are reported on the Vienna-Cañon Diablo Troilite (VCDT) scale. The original CDT scale was based on a sample of the mineral troilite recovered from the Canyon Diablo meteorite at Meteor Crater, Arizona, US. The Cañon Diablo Troilite was assigned a δ^{34}S value of 0‰. However, troilite from the Canyon Diablo meteorite was later discovered to have variable sulfur isotope composition. As a result, VCDT was established as a hypothetical sulfur isotope reference with a ^{34}R value of 0.044151 and δ^{34}S of 0‰, but no physical sample of VCDT exists. Samples are now measured in comparison to International Atomic Energy Agency (IAEA) reference materials, which are well-characterized, lab-prepared compounds with known δ^{34}S values. A commonly used IAEA reference material is IAEA-S-1, a silver sulfide reference material with a δ^{34}S value of −0.30‰ VCDT. ^{33}S and ^{36}S abundance can also be measured relative to IAEA reference materials and reported on the VCDT scale. For these isotopes, too, VCDT is established as having δ^{33}S and δ^{36}S values of 0‰. The ^{33}R value of VCDT is 0.007877 and the ^{36}R value is 0.0002. IAEA-S-1 has a ^{33}R value of 0.0007878 and a δ^{33}S value of −0.05‰ VCDT; it has a δ^{36}S value of −0.6‰ VCDT.

== Analytical methods and instrumentation ==
The sulfur isotopic composition of natural samples can be determined by Elemental Analysis-Isotope Ratio Mass Spectrometry (EA-IRMS), by Dual Inlet-Isotope Ratio Mass Spectrometry (DI-IRMS), by Multi-Collector-Inductively Coupled Plasma Mass Spectrometry (MC-ICPMS), by Secondary Ion Mass Spectrometry (SIMS), or by Nanoscale secondary ion mass spectrometry (NanoSIMS). MC-ICPMS can be paired with gas chromatography (GC-MC-ICPMS) to separate certain volatile compounds in a sample and measure the sulfur isotopic composition of individual compounds.

The sulfur isotopic compositions of minerals and porewater in sediment are subject to accumulation and diffusion after burial. Reactive transport models are often used to account for the effect of such physical processes and find out the isotopic effect of the process studied.

== Natural variations in sulfur isotope abundance ==
=== Sulfur in natural materials ===
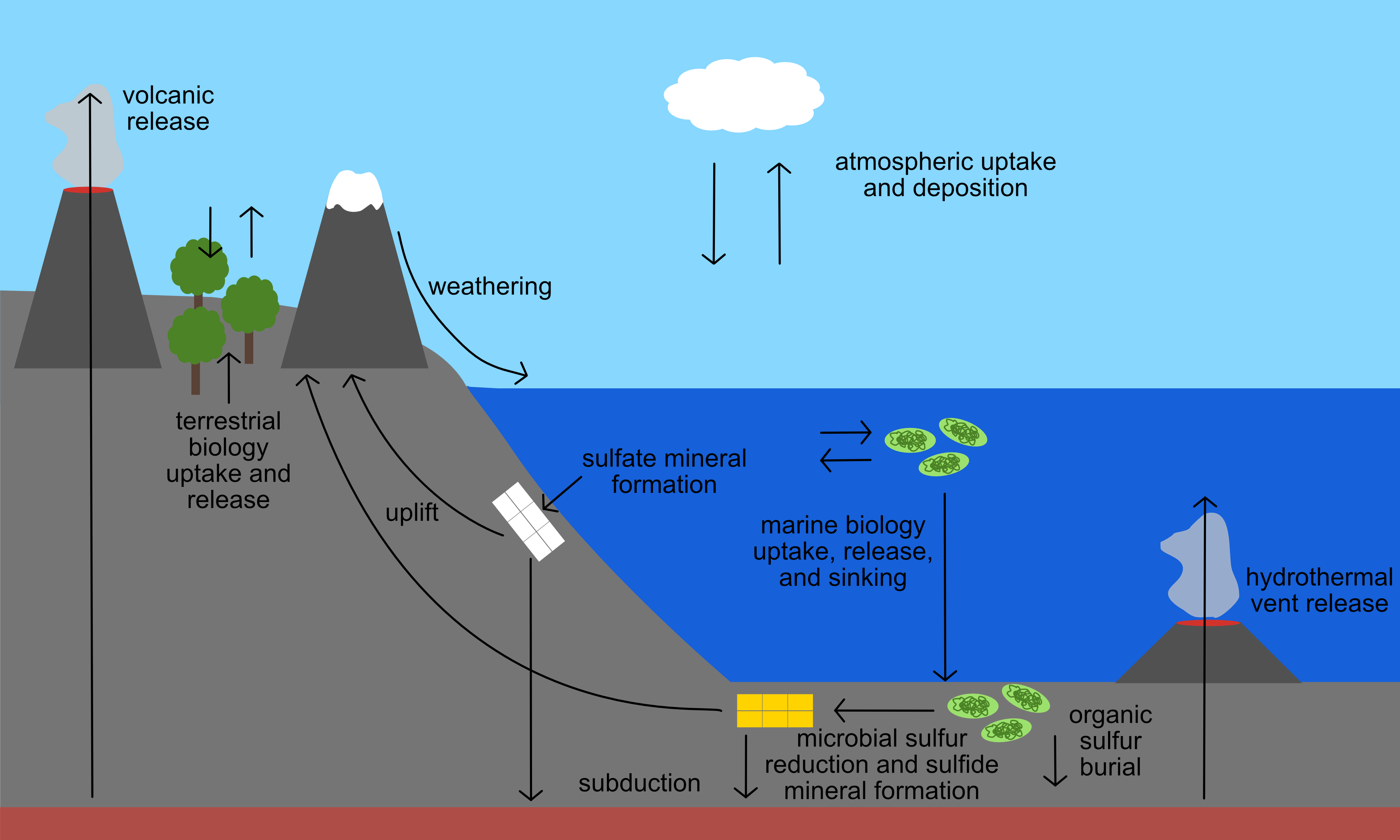
An illustration of some common processes in the biogeochemical sulfur cycle.

Sulfur is present in the environment in solids, gases, and aqueous species. Sulfur-containing solids on Earth include the common minerals pyrite (FeS_{2}), galena (PbS), and gypsum (CaSO_{4}•2H_{2}O). Sulfur is also an important component of biological material, including in the essential amino acids cysteine and methionine, the B vitamins thiamine and biotin, and the ubiquitous substrate coenzyme A. In the ocean and other natural waters, sulfur is abundant as dissolved sulfate. Hydrogen sulfide is also present in some parts of the deep ocean where it is released from hydrothermal vents. Both sulfate and sulfide can be used by specialized microbes to obtain energy or to grow. Gases including sulfur dioxide and carbonyl sulfide make up the atmospheric component of the sulfur cycle. Any process that transports or chemically transforms sulfur between these many natural materials also has the potential to fractionate sulfur isotopes.

=== Sulfur isotopic abundance in natural materials ===
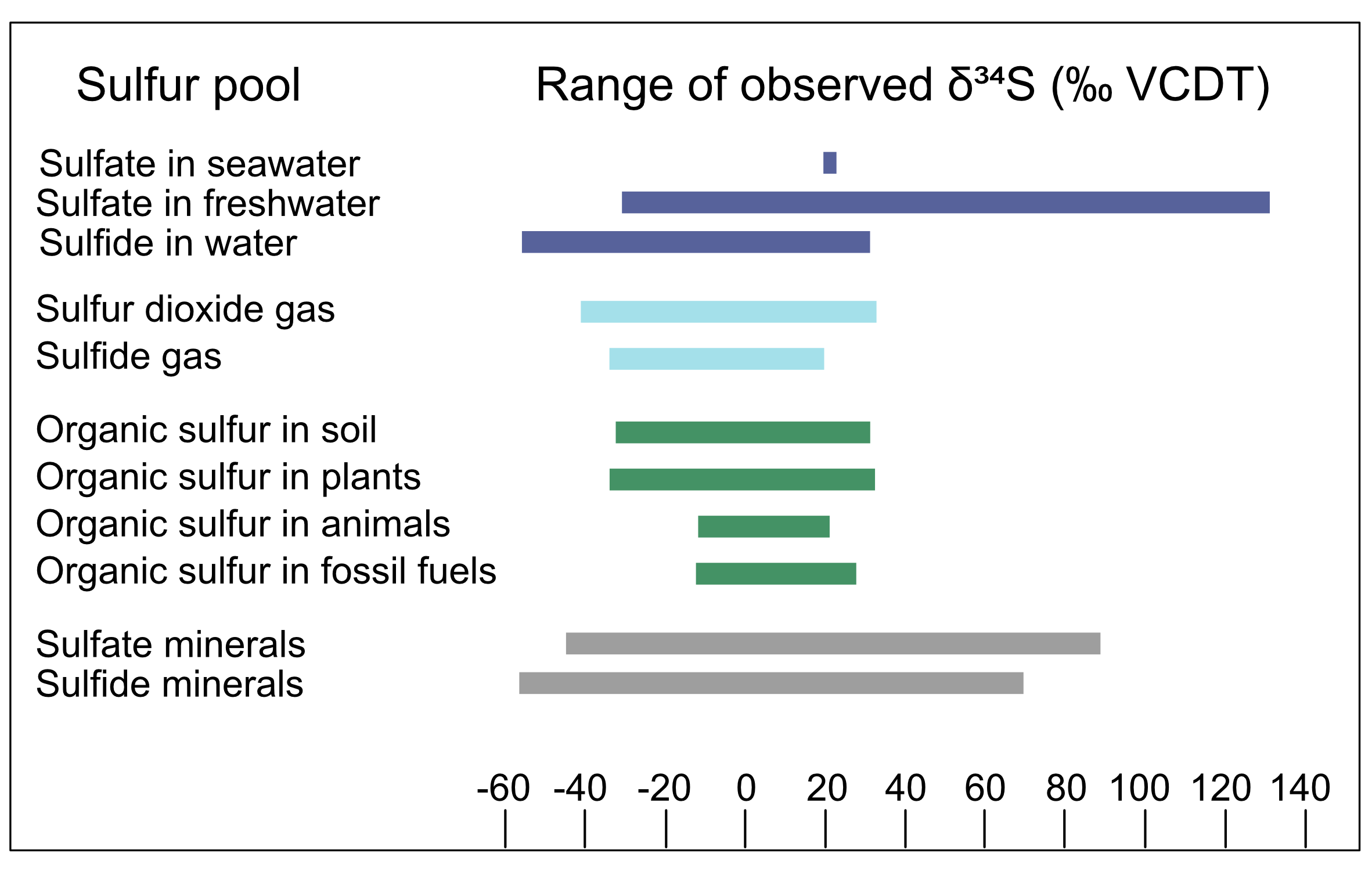
Natural range of sulfur isotopic composition on Earth, modified and simplified from Meija et al. (2013).

Sulfur in natural materials can vary widely in isotopic composition: compilations of the δ^{34}S values of natural sulfur-containing materials include values ranging from −55‰ to 135‰ VCDT. The ranges of δ^{34}S values vary across sulfur-containing materials: for example, the sulfur in animal tissue ranges from ~ −10 to +20‰ VCDT, while the sulfate in natural waters ranges from ~ −20 to +135‰ VCDT. The range of sulfur isotope abundances in different natural materials results from the isotope fractionation associated with natural processes like the formation and modification of those materials, discussed in the next section.

=== Processes that fractionate sulfur isotopes ===
Numerous natural processes are capable of fractionating sulfur isotopes. Microbes are capable of a wide variety of sulfur metabolisms, including the oxidation, reduction, and disproportionation (or simultaneous oxidation and reduction) of sulfur compounds. The effect of these metabolisms on sulfur isotopic composition of the reactants and products is also highly variable, depending on the rate of relevant reactions, availability of nutrients, diagenesis, and other biological, physical and environmental parameters. As an example, the microbial reduction of sulfate to sulfide generally results in a ^{34}S-depleted product, but the strength of this fractionation has been shown to range from 0 to 65.6‰ VCDT.

Many abiotic processes also fractionate sulfur isotopes. Small fractionations with ε values from 0–5‰ have been observed in the formation of the mineral gypsum, an evaporite mineral produced through the evaporation of seawater. Some sulfide minerals, including pyrite and galena, can form through thermochemical sulfate reduction, a process in which seawater sulfate trapped in seafloor rock is reduced to sulfide by geological heat as the rock is buried; this process generally fractionates sulfur more strongly than gypsum formation.

Prior to the rise of oxygen in Earth's atmosphere (referred to as the Great Oxidation Event), additional sulfur-fractionating processes referred to as mass-anomalous or mass-independent fractionation uniquely affected the abundance of ^{33}S and ^{36}S in the rock record. Mass-anomalous fractionations are rare, but they can occur through certain photochemical reactions of gases in the atmosphere. Studies have shown that photochemical reactions of atmospheric sulfur dioxide can cause substantial mass-anomalous fractionation of sulfur isotopes.

Observed ^{34}ε values for some common natural processes.
Process	Range of observed ^{34}ε (‰ VCDT)	Reference
Assimilatory sulfate reduction	−2.8 to −0.9	
Dissimilatory sulfate reduction	−65.6 to 0	
Sulfite reduction	−41 to +0.3	
Sulfide oxidation	−18.0 to +3	
Sulfur disproportionation	Sulfate: −0.6 to +20.2 Sulfide: −8.6 to −5.5	
Thermochemical sulfate reduction	+10 to +25	
Gypsum formation	0 to +4.2	

==== Biological processes of sulfur uptake ====
All organisms metabolize sulfur, and it is incorporated into the structure of proteins, polysaccharides, steroids, and many coenzymes. The biological pathway by which an organism takes up and/or removes sulfur can have significant impacts on the sulfur isotope composition of the organism and its environment.

A general dissimilatory sulfate reduction pathway as used by sulfate-reducing bacteria.

Microorganisms that consume and reduce sulfate in relatively large quantities perform a different pathway of sulfur uptake called dissimilatory sulfate reduction. These organisms use sulfate reduction as an energy source as opposed to a way to synthesize new cell components, and remove the resulting sulfide as a waste product. Microbial sulfate reduction has been demonstrated to fractionate sulfur isotopes in bacteria, with some studies showing a dependence upon sulfate concentration and/or temperature. Studies examining dozens of species of dissimilatory sulfate reducing microbes have observed sulfur isotope fractionations ranging from −65.6‰ to 0‰.

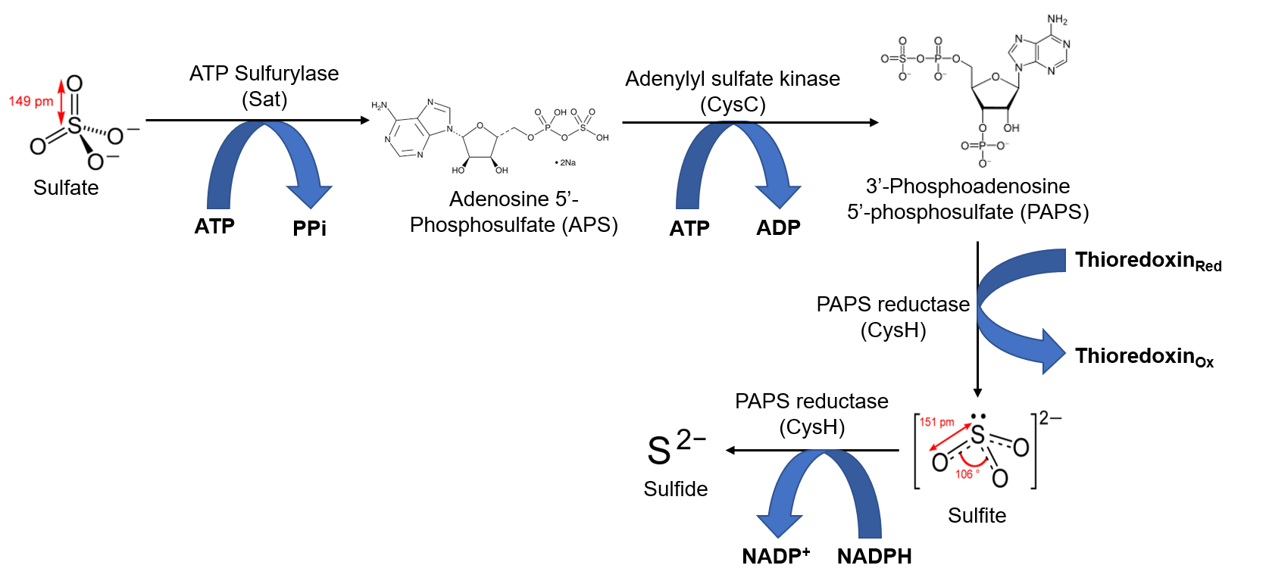
The assimilatory sulfate reduction pathway as used by E. coli.

Some organisms take in relatively small amounts of sulfate in a process called assimilatory sulfate reduction, for the purpose of synthesizing compounds that contain sulfur, such as the amino acids methionine and cysteine that can then be used to make proteins. In phytoplankton, most of the sulfur taken up through assimilatory sulfate reduction is incorporated into biomass as proteins (~35%), sulfate esters (~20%), and low-weight sulfur-containing compounds (~40%). Literature on the isotopic fractionation effects of the assimilatory sulfate reduction pathway is much more limited than that discussing dissimilatory sulfate reduction, but some sources report slight isotopic variations (δ^{34}S = −4.4‰ to +0.5‰) in the resulting organic sulfur relative to the surrounding sulfate.

While dissimilatory sulfate reduction and assimilatory sulfate reduction are two of the most common pathways by which organisms take up and utilize sulfate, there are many other pathways by which living things take up sulfur. For example, sulfur oxidation of compounds like hydrogen sulfide and elemental sulfur is performed by lithotrophic bacteria and chemosynthetic archaea. Most animals obtain sulfur directly from the methionine and cysteine in the protein they consume.

== Sulfur isotopes in plants ==
=== Methods of detection ===
Previous efforts to understand how sulfur metabolism and biosynthetic pathways relied on expensive labeling experiments using radioactive ^{35}S. By leveraging natural assimilatory processes, stable isotope ratios can be used to track the sources of sulfur for plants, plant organs used in sulfur acquisition, the movement of sulfur through plants.

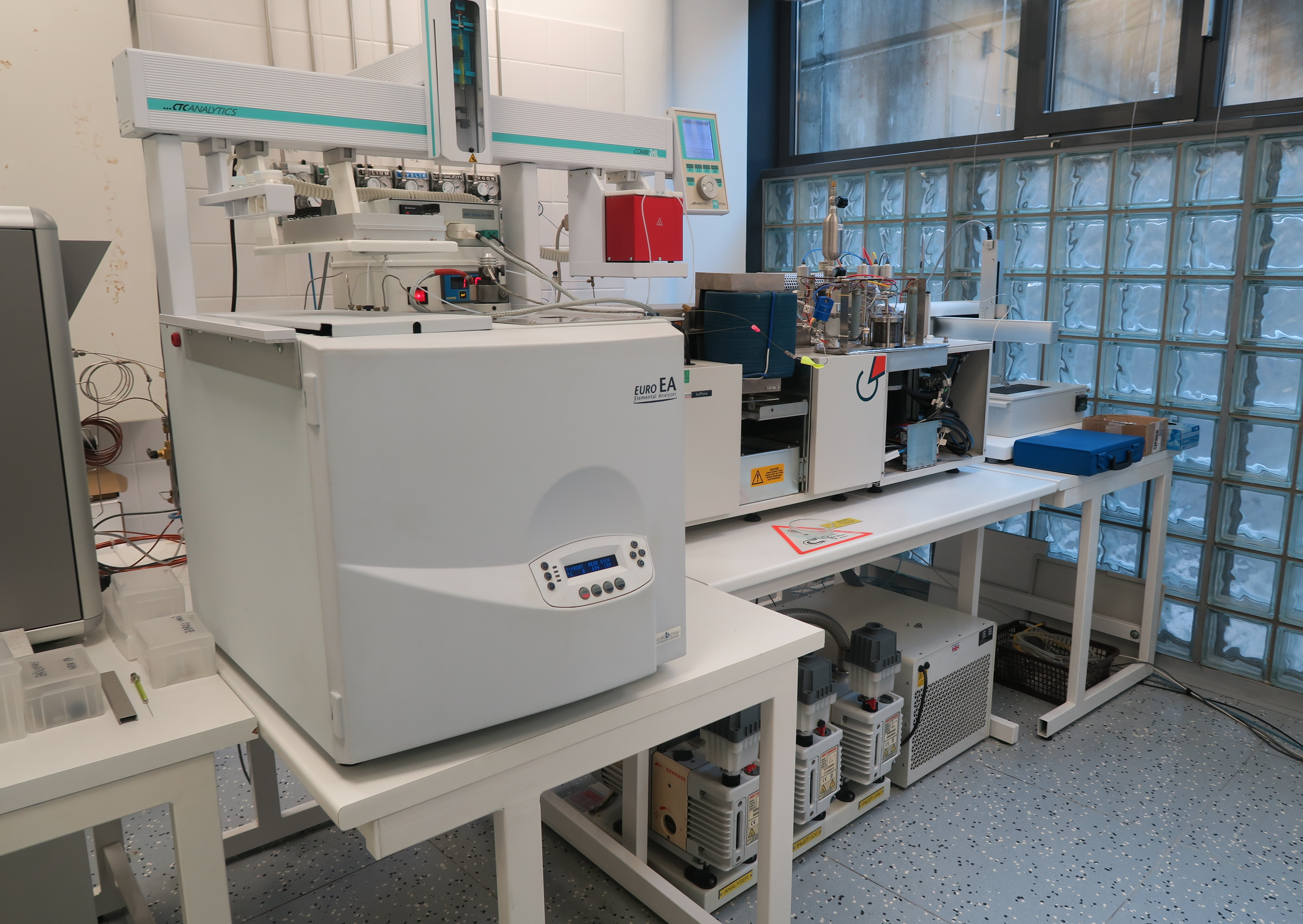
Elemental Analysis-Isotope Ratio Mass Spectrometer (EA-IRMS)

Sulfur (S) stable isotope composition measurements are often performed using an Elemental Analysis-Isotope Ratio Mass Spectrometer, (EA-IRMS) in which organic sulfur from biological samples is oxidized to sulfur dioxide (SO_{2}) and analyzed on a mass spectrometer. The mass spectrometer is used to quantify the ratio of the lighter (^{32}S^{16}O_{2}) to the heavier (^{34}S^{16}O_{2}) isotopologue of SO_{2}, and this ratio is then compared to sulfur isotope standards in order to standardize data to the VSMOW scale. In biological materials, sulfur is scarce relative to other organic elements like carbon and oxygen, introducing some additional difficulty in measuring its stable isotope composition. The elemental S composition of plant matter is ≈0.2%, accounting for approximately 2 mmol/m^{2} in most leaf tissue. In order to reach detectable levels of 30 ng to 3 μg of elemental S to calculate reliable δ^{34}S values, leaf tissue samples need to be between 2–5 mg.

Improvements in detection have been made in recent years in the utilization of gas chromatography coupled with multicollector ICP-MS (GC/MC-ICP-MS) to be able to measure pmol quantities of organic S. Additionally, ICP-MS has been used to measure nanomolar quantities of dissolved sulfate. Most studies have focused on measuring the bulk δ^{34}S value of plant tissues and few studies have been performed on measuring the δ^{34}S values of individual S-containing compounds. The coupling of high-performance liquid chromatography (HPLC) with ICP-MS has been proposed as a way to test individual S-containing compounds.

=== Sources of sulfur in plants ===
Each year, approximately 0.3 gigatons of elemental sulfur is converted into organic matter by photosynthetic organisms. This organic sulfur is allocated into a diversity of compounds such as amino acids – namely cysteine (Cys) and methionine (Met) – proteins, cofactors, antioxidants, sulfate groups, Fe-S centers and secondary metabolites. The three main sources of sulfur are atmospheric, soil, and aquatic.

Most vegetation can acquire sulfur from gaseous atmospheric compounds or various ions either in soil solutions or water bodies. Uptake of gaseous and dissolved sulfur compounds apparently occurs with little accompanying isotopic selectivity. Dissolved sulfate (SO_{4}^{2-}) is considered to be the central pool which is metabolized by microorganisms and plants as most forms of atmospheric sulfur is oxidized into sulfate. Atmospheric sulfur is eventually returned to the soil when it is scrubbed from the atmosphere during precipitation or through dryfall.

==== Atmosphere ====
Many plants acquire sulfur through gaseous atmospheric compounds. Leaves of trees have δ^{34}S values lying between those of air and soil, suggesting that there is uptake occurring from atmospheric and soil sources. The δ^{34}S values of trees has also been demonstrated to be height dependent, with the foliage at the tops of conifers, bull rushes and deciduous trees having δ^{34}S values more reflective of the atmosphere and lower foliage having δ^{34}S values closer to that of soil. It has been proposed that this is due to upper foliage exerting a canopy action on the lower branches, taking up atmospheric sulfur before it can reach lower levels. This is further supported with the epiphytic lichens and mosses having δ^{34}S values close to atmospheric S compounds. This occurs due to lichens and mosses having no access to soil and relying on the direct uptake of gaseous sulfur, dissolved sulfur through rainfall and dry fall accumulation, providing a cumulative record of atmospheric sulfur isotope composition.

Main forms of atmospheric sulfur come from the natural sulfur emissions formed biologically and emitted as H_{2}S or organic sulfur gases such as DMS (dimethyl sulfide), COS (carbonyl sulfide), and CS_{2} (carbon disulfide). These gases are predominantly formed over oceans, wetlands, salt marshes, and estuaries by algae and bacteria. Anthropogenic emissions have increased the concentration of sulfur in the atmosphere mainly through emissions of SO_{2}, from coal, oil, industrial processes, and biomass burning. In 2000, global anthropogenic emission of sulfur was estimated of 55.2–68 Tg S per year, which is much higher than the natural sulfur emissions estimated to be 34 Tg S per year. In the event of excess sulfur in plant tissue, it has been demonstrated that when exposed to high doses of sulfur dioxide, plants emit hydrogen sulfide (H_{2}S) and possibly other reduced sulfur compounds in response to high sulfur loading

==== Soil ====
This is a simplified model of how sulfur is taken up by plants and how sulfur moves through the environment

If soil sulfur is derived consistently from one source, the water-soluble and insoluble organic S fractions acquire similar isotopic compositions. In the case that there are two or more sources and/or if the isotopic composition of atmospheric or groundwater sulfate fluctuates, there may not be sufficient time for isotopic homogenization among the various forms of sulfur. The primary form of sulfur in soil is sulfate, which is transported upwards through the root system with minimal δ^{34}S fractionation by 1–2‰. In contrast to higher canopy plants reflecting atmospheric δ^{34}S, protected understory plants tend to reflect soil sulfur.

==== Aquatic ====
The forms of sulfur available in aquatic environments depends on whether it is a marine or freshwater environment. Freshwater environments are more varied and subject to a multitude of sulfur inputs and outputs, including atmospheric deposition, runoff, diagenesis of bedrock and the presence of microbial sulfate reducers (MSR). Overall, the main species of sulfur in freshwater environments are hydrogen sulfide and sulfate. In estuaries, plant roots extend into sulfide-rich, ^{34}S-depleted sediments created by MSR, and incorporate that sulfide into their biomass. However, levels of sulfide produced by MSR can be toxic, and it has been proposed that these plants pump oxygen into their roots to oxidize sulfide into the less toxic sulfate. In these environments algae will preferentially acquire sulfur from HS^{−} if present, rather than the more abundant sulfate, as sulfide can be readily incorporated into the direct formation of cysteine. This is consistent with cyanobacteria being able to carry out anoxygenic photosynthesis using sulfide.

In marine environments, the main forms of sulfur available is in sulfate at ~29 mM and a δ^{34}S of 21‰ in seawater. At the surface of the sea, this excess in sulfur is subsequently converted into dimethylsulfoniopropionate (DMSP) by algae as an osmolyte and a repellent against grazing. DMSP also accounts for 50–100% of bacterial sulfur demand, making it the most important source of reduced sulfur for marine bacteria. DMSP's cleavage product dimethyl sulfide (DMS) is highly volatile, escaping the ocean into the atmosphere with emissions ranging between 15 and 33 Tg S year^{−1} and accounting for 50–60% of the total natural reduced sulfur flux to the atmosphere. In seafloor sediments, microbial sulfate reduction is a major biogeochemical process that consumes organic carbon. Microbial sulfate reduction can completely use up sulfate from the seawater and accumulate hydrogen sulfide in the sediment. Sulfide reoxidation and disproportionation are also thought to be major processes affecting the sulfur isotopic compositions of marine minerals and sediment porewater.

=== Biochemistry ===
~90% of the organic sulfur in plants is concentrated in the amino acids cysteine and methionine. Cysteine acts as the direct or indirect precursor to any other organic sulfur compounds in plants such as coenzyme-A, methionine, biotin, lipoic acid and glutathione. The carbon skeleton necessary for sulfur assimilation are provided by glycolysis (acetyl-CoA), respiration (aspartic acid, Asp, which derives from oxaloacetate) and photorespiration (serine, Ser). Because cysteine is a direct precursor to methionine, methionine is naturally ^{34}S-depleted in comparison to cysteine. The majority of sulfur is generally in the organic form but, when excess sulfur is available in the environment, inorganic sulfate becomes the major sulfur form. In most plants, ^{34}S discrimination is minimal, and in a study of rice plants it was observed that discrimination takes place in the uptake stage, depleting imported sulfate by 1–2‰ from the source. This effect is through the expression of SO_{4}^{2−} transporter genes (SULTR), 14 of which have been identified – which are expressed dependent on the availability of sulfate in the environment. When sulfate is plentiful low affinity transporters are expressed and when sulfate is scarce high affinity genes with greater ^{34}S discrimination are expressed.

=== Distribution through plant organs ===
Sulfate transported through the roots and SO_{2} diffusing into leaves becomes the pool for plants to assimilate sulfur throughout their tissues. Though there is minimal fractionation from the source sulfur of the total plant organic matter, in wheat, roots and stems are depleted from soil by 2‰ and leaves and grain are 2‰ enriched. The ^{34}S enrichment in leaf whole matter is not caused by ^{34}S-enriched sulfate present in the leaf, but is the result of the ^{34}S-enrichment arriving at sink organs causing proteins in the leaves to be ^{34}S-enriched. In rice, translocation from root to shoot does not discriminate S isotopes, however, the sulfate pools of the shoot are significantly ^{34}S-enriched with respect to the sulfate pools of both root and sap. As sulfate moves through the plant system and is incorporated into biomass, the pool becomes enriched, giving organs such as leaves and grains higher δ^{34}S values than earlier tissues.

== Applications ==
=== Rise of atmospheric oxygen ===
Signatures of mass-anomalous sulfur isotope fractionation preserved in the rock record have been an important piece of evidence for understanding the Great Oxidation Event, the sudden rise of oxygen on the ancient Earth. Nonzero values of Δ^{33}S and Δ^{36}S are present in the sulfur-bearing minerals of Precambrian rock formed greater than 2.45 billion years ago, but completely absent from rock less than 2.09 billion years old. Multiple mechanisms have been proposed for how oxygen prevents the fingerprints of mass-anomalous fractionation from being created and preserved; nevertheless, all studies of Δ^{33}S and Δ^{36}S records conclude that oxygen was essentially absent from Earth's atmosphere prior to 2.45 billion years ago.

=== Paleobiology and paleoclimate ===
A number of microbial metabolisms fractionate sulfur isotopes in distinctive ways, and the sulfur isotopic fingerprints of these metabolisms can be preserved in minerals and ancient organic matter. By measuring the sulfur isotopic composition of these preserved materials, scientists can reconstruct ancient biological processes and the environments where they occurred. δ^{34}S values in the geologic record have been inferred to reveal the history of microbial sulfate reduction and sulfide oxidation. Paired δ^{34}S and Δ^{33}S records have also been used to show ancient microbial sulfur disproportionation.

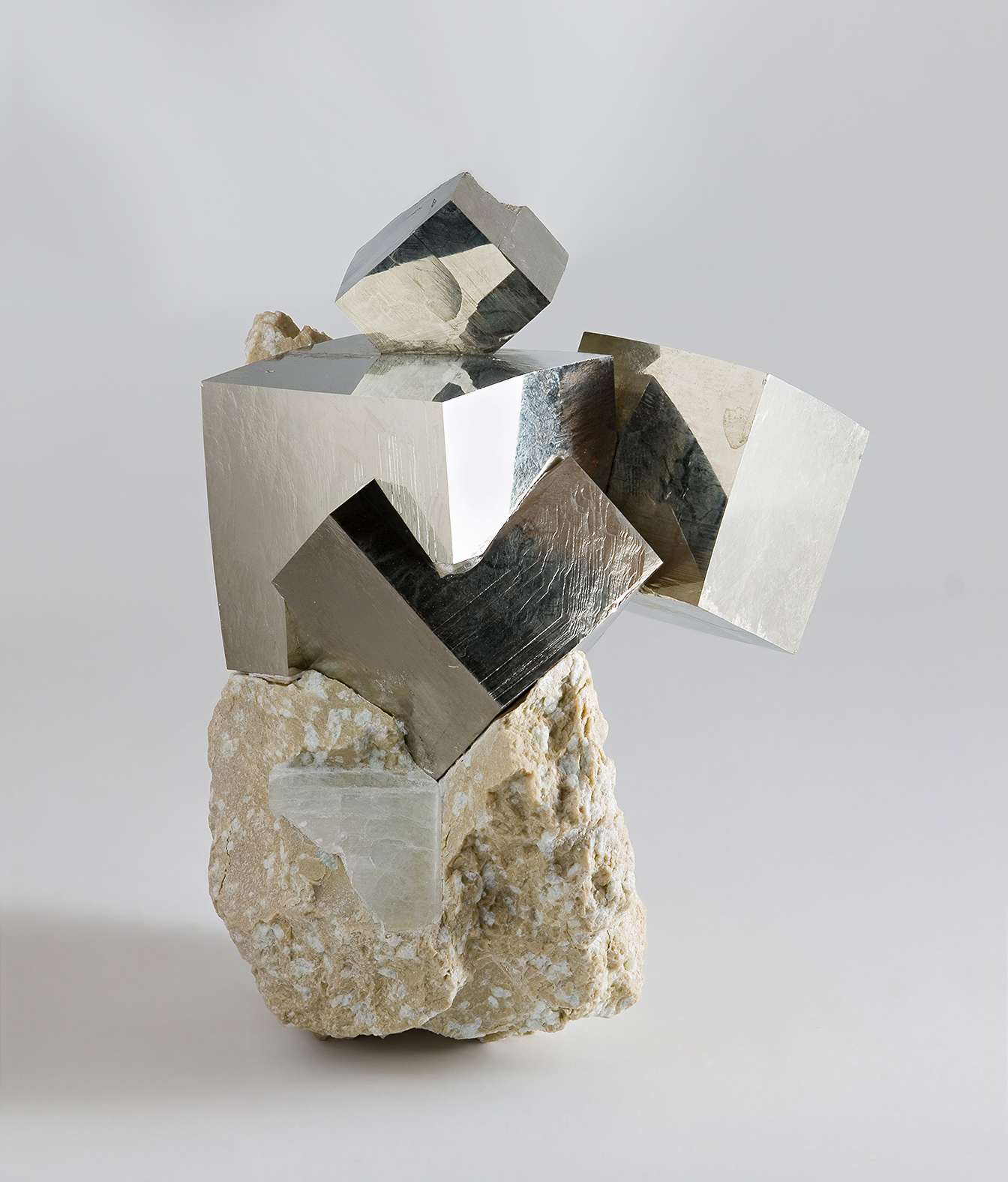
Pyrite, a sulfur-bearing mineral that forms in some ocean sediments, usually has relatively low δ^{34}S values due to the indirect role of biology in its formation.

Microbial dissimilatory sulfate reduction (MSR), an energy-yielding metabolism performed by bacteria in anoxic environments, is associated with an especially large fractionation factor. The observed ^{34}ε_{MSR} values range from 0 to −65.6‰. Many factors influence the size of this fractionation, including sulfate reduction rate, sulfate concentration and transport, availability of electron donors and other nutrients, and physiological differences like protein expression. Sulfide produced through MSR may then go on to form the mineral pyrite, preserving the ^{34}S-depleted fingerprint of MSR in sedimentary rocks. Many studies have investigated the δ^{34}S values of ancient pyrite in order to understand past biological and environmental conditions. For example, pyrite δ^{34}S records have been used to reconstruct shifts in primary productivity levels, changing ocean oxygen content, and glacial-interglacial changes in sea level and weathering. Some studies compare sulfur isotopes in pyrite to a second sulfur-containing material, like dissolved sulfate or preserved organic matter. Comparing pyrite to another material gives a fuller picture of how sulfur moved through ancient environments: it provides clues about the size of ancient ^{34}ε_{MSR} values and the environmental conditions controlling MSR fractionation of sulfur isotopes.

=== Paleoceanography ===
δ^{34}S records have been used to infer changes in seawater sulfate concentrations. Because the δ^{34}S values of carbonate-associated sulfate are thought to be sensitive to seawater sulfate levels, these measurements have been used to reconstruct the history of seawater sulfate. δ^{34}S values of pyrite have also been applied to reconstruct the concentration of seawater sulfate, based on expected biological fractionations at low sulfate concentrations. Both of these methods rely on assumptions about the depositional environment or the biological community, creating some uncertainty in the resulting reconstructions.

== See also ==
- Δ34S
- Isotopes of sulfur
- Hydrogen isotope biogeochemistry
- Stable isotope ratio
- Isotope analysis
- Isotope geochemistry
