= Sulfur cycle =

Biogeochemical cycle of sulfur

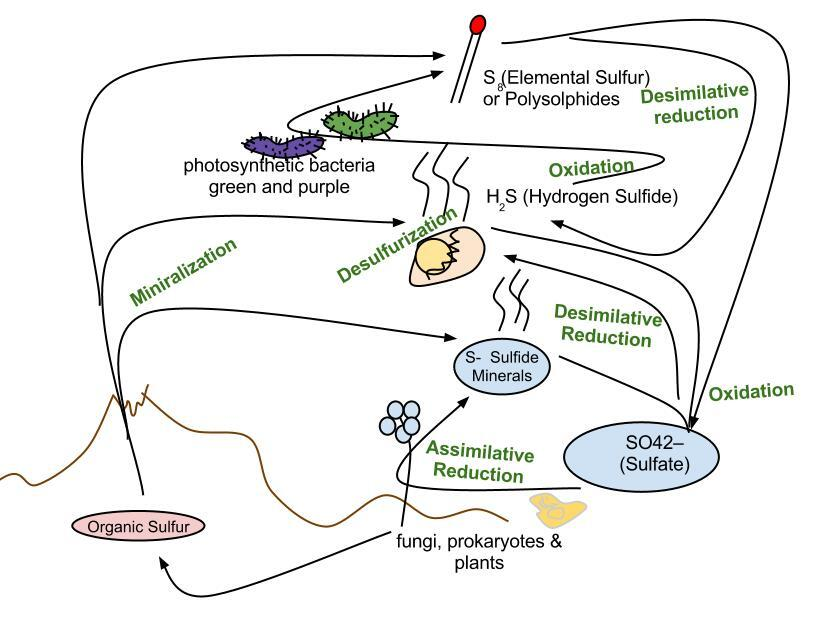
Sulfur cycle in general

The sulfur cycle is a biogeochemical cycle in which the sulfur moves between rocks, waterways and living systems. It is important in geology as it affects many minerals and in life because sulfur is an essential element (CHNOPS), being a constituent of many proteins and cofactors, and sulfur compounds can be used as oxidants or reductants in cellular respiration. The global sulfur cycle involves the transformations of sulfur species through different oxidation states, which play an important role in both geological and biological processes. Steps of the sulfur cycle are:

- Mineralization of organic sulfur into inorganic forms, such as hydrogen sulfide (H_{2}S), elemental sulfur, as well as sulfide minerals.
- Incorporation of sulfide into organic compounds (including metal-containing derivatives).
- Oxidation of hydrogen sulfide, sulfide, and elemental sulfur (S) to sulfate (SO^{2−}_{4}).
- Reduction of sulfate and sulfite to sulfide.
- Disproportionation of sulfur compounds (elemental sulfur, sulfite, thiosulfate) into sulfate and hydrogen sulfide.

These are often termed as follows:

Assimilative sulfate reduction (see also sulfur assimilation) in which sulfate (SO^{2−}_{4}) is reduced by plants, fungi and various prokaryotes. The oxidation states of sulfur are +6 in sulfate and –2 in R–SH.
Desulfurization in which organic molecules containing sulfur can be desulfurized, producing hydrogen sulfide gas (H_{2}S, oxidation state = –2). An analogous process for organic nitrogen compounds is deamination.
Oxidation of hydrogen sulfide produces elemental sulfur (S_{8}), oxidation state = 0. This reaction occurs in the photosynthetic green and purple sulfur bacteria and some chemolithotrophs. Often the elemental sulfur is stored as polysulfides.
Oxidation of elemental sulfur by sulfur oxidizers produces sulfate.
Dissimilative sulfur reduction in which elemental sulfur can be reduced to hydrogen sulfide.
Dissimilative sulfate reduction in which sulfate reducers generate hydrogen sulfide from sulfate.

== Sulfur oxidation states ==
Sulfur can be found under several oxidation states in nature, mainly −2, −1, 0, +2 (apparent), +2.5 (apparent), +4, and +6. When two sulfur atoms are present in the same polyatomic oxyanion in an asymmetrical situation, i.e., each bound to different groups as in thiosulfate, the oxidation state calculated from the known oxidation state of accompanying atoms (H = +1, and O = −2) can be an apparent average (+2 as in thiosulfate), and even differ from an entire number (+2.5 as in tetrathionate). This is the direct consequence of the different valence of each sulfur atoms present in the oxyanion. The most common sulfur species participating to the sulfur cycle are listed hereafter from the most reduced to the most oxidized:

S (−2): H_{2}S, HS^{−}, S^{2−}; (CH_{3})_{2}S

S (−1): disulfide, ^{−}S—S^{−}, or S^{2−}_{2}, as in FeS_{2}

S (0): native, or elemental, sulfur (S_{8})

S (+2): thiosulfate, S_{2}O^{2−}_{3} (here +2 is only an "apparent mean" oxidation state: (+5 -1)/2 = +2 because the two sulfur atoms in thiosulfate are not at the same oxidation state. In fact they are at +5 and −1 respectively).

S (+4): SO_{2}; sulfite (SO^{2−}_{3})

S (+6): SO^{2−}_{4} (H_{2}SO_{4}, CaSO_{4}).

== Sulfur sources and sinks ==
Sulfur is found in oxidation states ranging from +6 in SO^{2−}_{4} to −2 in sulfides. Thus, elemental sulfur can either give or receive electrons depending on its environment. On the anoxic early Earth, most sulfur was present in minerals such as pyrite (FeS_{2}). Over Earth history, the amount of mobile sulfur increased through volcanic activity as well as weathering of the crust in an oxygenated atmosphere. Earth's main sulfur sink is the oceans SO^{2−}_{4} available as electron acceptor for microorganisms in anoxic waters.

Mean acidifying emissions (air pollution) of different foods per 100 grams of protein
Food Types	Acidifying Emissions (g SO_{2}eq per 100 g protein)
Beef	343.6
Cheese	165.5
Pork	142.7
Lamb and Mutton	139.0
Farmed Crustaceans	133.1
Poultry	102.4
Farmed Fish	65.9
Eggs	53.7
Groundnuts	22.6
Peas	8.5
Tofu	6.7

When SO^{2−}_{4} is assimilated by organisms, it is reduced and converted to organic sulfur, which is an essential component of proteins. However, the biosphere does not act as a major sink for sulfur, instead the majority of sulfur is found in seawater or sedimentary rocks including: pyrite rich shales, evaporite rocks (anhydrite and baryte), and calcium and magnesium carbonates (i.e. carbonate-associated sulfate). The amount of sulfate in the oceans is controlled by three major processes:

1. input from rivers
2. sulfate reduction and sulfide re-oxidation on continental shelves and slopes
3. burial of anhydrite and pyrite in the oceanic crust.

The primary natural source of sulfur to the atmosphere is sea spray or windblown sulfur-rich dust, neither of which is long lived in the atmosphere. In recent times, the large annual input of sulfur from the burning of coal and other fossil fuels has added a substantial amount of SO_{2} which acts as an air pollutant. In the geologic past, igneous intrusions into coal measures have caused large scale burning of these measures, and consequential release of sulfur to the atmosphere. This has led to substantial disruption to the climate system, and is one of the proposed causes of the Permian–Triassic extinction event.

Dimethylsulfide [(CH_{3})_{2}S or DMS] is produced by the decomposition of dimethylsulfoniopropionate (DMSP) from dying phytoplankton cells in the ocean's photic zone, and is the major biogenic gas emitted from the sea, where it is responsible for the distinctive “smell of the sea” along coastlines. DMS is the largest natural source of sulfur gas, but still only has a residence time of about one day in the atmosphere and a majority of it is redeposited in the oceans rather than making it to land. However, it is a significant factor in the climate system, as it is involved in the formation of clouds.

== Biologically and thermochemically driven sulfate reduction ==
Dissimilatory sulfate reduction pathway

3′-phosphoadenosine-5′-phosphosulfate (key intermediate in the sulfur cycle)

Through the dissimilatory sulfate reduction pathway, sulfate can be reduced either bacterially (bacterial sulfate reduction) or inorganically (thermochemical sulfate reduction). This pathway involves the reduction of sulfate by organic compounds to produce hydrogen sulfide, which occurs in both processes.

The main products and reactants of bacterial sulfate reduction (BSR) and thermochemical sulfate reduction (TSR) are very similar. For both, various organic compounds and dissolved sulfate are the reactants, and the products or by-products are as follows: H_{2}S, CO_{2}, carbonates, elemental sulfur and metal sulfides. However, the reactive organic compounds differ for BSR and TSR because of the mutually exclusive temperature regimes. Organic acids are the main organic reactants for BSR and branched/n-alkanes are the main organic reactants for TSR. The inorganic reaction products in BSR and TSR are H_{2}S (HS^{−}) and HCO^{−}_{3} (CO_{2}).

These processes occur because there are two very different thermal regimes in which sulfate is reduced, particularly in low-temperature and high-temperature environments. BSR usually occurs at lower temperatures from 0−80 °C, while TSR happens at much higher temperatures around 100–140 °C. Temperatures for TSR are not as well defined; the lowest confirmed temperature is 127 °C and the highest temperatures occur in settings around 160−180 °C. These two different regimes appear because at higher temperatures most sulfate-reducing microbes can no longer metabolize due to the denaturation of proteins or deactivation of enzymes, so TSR takes over. However, in hot sediments around hydrothermal vents BSR can happen at temperatures up to 110 °C.

BSR and TSR occur at different depths. BSR takes place in low-temperature environments, which are shallower settings such as oil and gas fields. BSR can also take place in modern marine sedimentary environments such as stratified inland seas, continental shelves, organic-rich deltas, and hydrothermal sediments which have intense microbial sulfate reduction because of the high concentration of dissolved sulfate in the seawater. Additionally, the high amounts of hydrogen sulfide found in oil and gas fields is thought to arise from the oxidation of petroleum hydrocarbons by sulfate. Such reactions are known to occur by microbial processes but it is generally accepted that TSR is responsible for the bulk of these reactions, especially in deep or hot reservoirs. Thus, TSR occurs in deep reservoirs where the temperatures are much higher. BSR is geologically instantaneous in most geologic settings, while TSR occurs at rates in the order of hundreds of thousands of years. Although much slower than BSR, even TSR appears to be a geologically fairly fast process.

BSR in shallow environments and TSR in deep reservoirs are key processes in the oceanic sulfur cycle. Approximately, 10% (of the total gas) of H_{2}S is produced in BSR settings, whereas 90% of the H_{2}S is produced in TSR settings. If there is more than a few percent of H_{2}S in any deep reservoir, then it is assumed that TSR has taken over. This is due to the fact that thermal cracking of hydrocarbons doesn't provide more than 3% of H_{2}S. The amount of H_{2}S is affected by several factors such as, the availability of organic reactants and sulfate and the presence/availability of base and transition metals.

== Microbial sulfur oxidation ==
Sulfide oxidation is performed by both bacteria and archaea in a variety of environmental conditions. Aerobic sulfide oxidation is usually performed by autotrophs that use sulfide or elemental sulfur to fix carbon dioxide. The oxidation pathway includes the formation of various intermediate sulfur species, including elemental sulfur and thiosulfate. Under low oxygen concentrations, microbes will oxidize to elemental sulfur. This elemental sulfur accumulates as sulfur globules, intracellularly or extracellularly, to be consumed under low sulfur concentrations. To ameliorate low oxidant concentrations (that is, to find an electron sink), sulfur oxidizers like cable bacteria form long chains that span the length between oxic and sulfidic zones of the coastal sediments. The bacteria present in the sulfide rich zones oxidize the sulfide and transport the electrons to the bacteria present in the oxygen rich zone through multiple periplasmic strings where the oxygen is reduced.

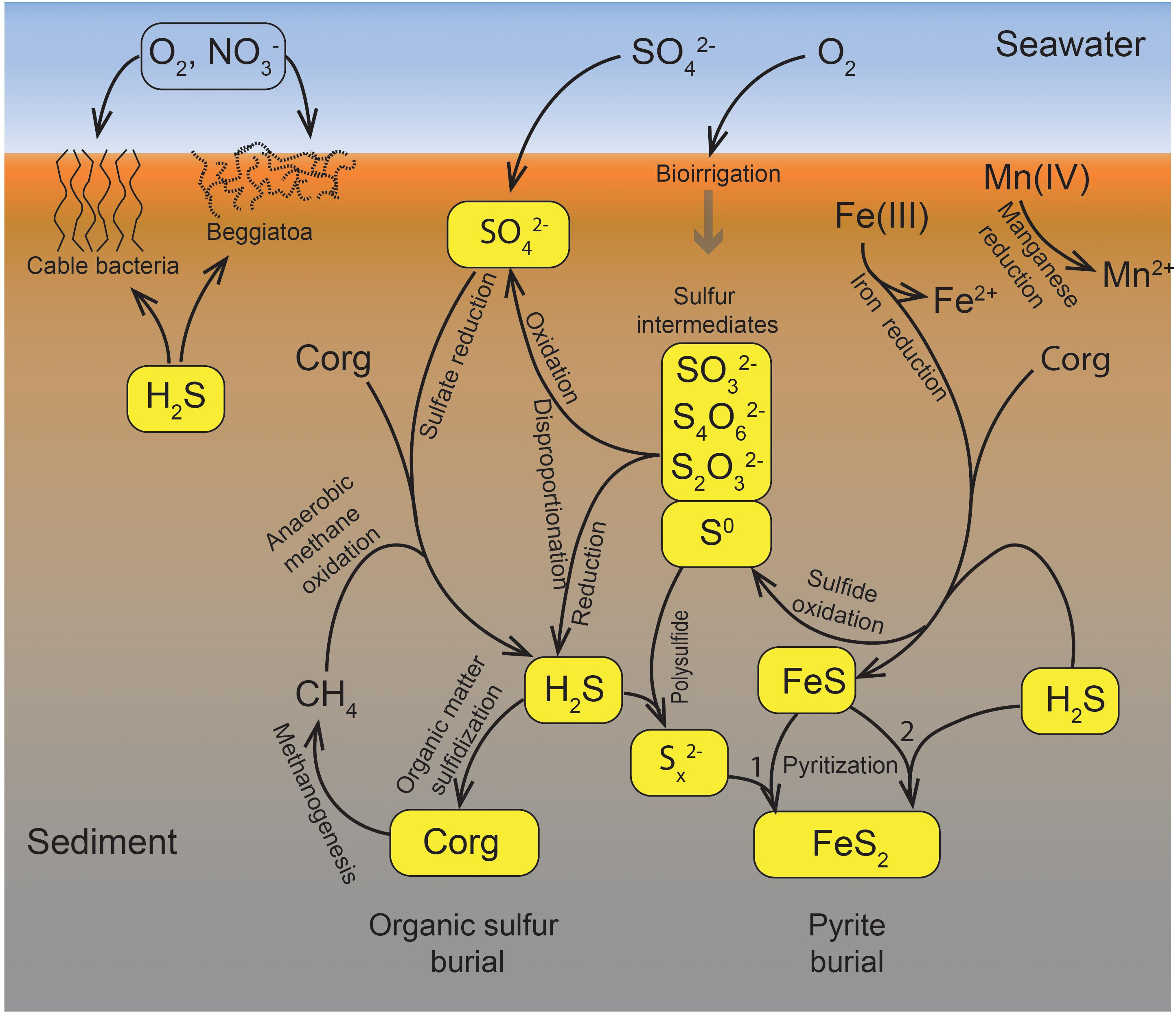
Biogeochemical sulfur cycle of marine sediments

Anaerobic sulfide oxidation is performed by both phototrophs and chemotrophs. Green sulfur bacteria (GSB) and purple sulfur bacteria (PSB) perform anoxygenic photosynthesis fueled by sulfide oxidation. Some PSB can also perform aerobic sulfide oxidation in the presence of oxygen and can even grow chemoautotrophically under low light conditions. GSB lack this metabolic potential and have compensated by developing efficient light harvesting systems. PSB can be found in various environments ranging from hot sulfur springs and alkaline lakes to wastewater treatment plants. GSB populate stratified lakes with high reduced sulfur concentrations and can even grow in hydrothermal vents by using infra-red light to perform photosynthesis.

Hydrothermal vents emit hydrogen sulfide that support the carbon fixation of chemolithotrophic bacteria that oxidize hydrogen sulfide with oxygen to produce elemental sulfur or sulfate. The chemical reactions are as follows:

CO_{2} + 4 H_{2}S + O_{2} → CH_{2}O + 4 S^{0} + 3 H_{2}O

CO_{2} + H_{2}S + O_{2} + H_{2}O → CH_{2}O + SO^{2–}_{4} + 2 H^{+}

In modern oceans, Thiomicrospira, Halothiobacillus, and Beggiatoa are primary sulfur oxidizing bacteria, and form chemosynthetic symbioses with animal hosts. The host provides metabolic substrates (e.g., CO_{2}, O_{2}, H_{2}O) to the symbiont while the symbiont generates organic carbon for sustaining the metabolic activities of the host. The produced sulfate usually combines with the leached calcium ions to form gypsum, which can form widespread deposits on near mid-ocean spreading centers.

Sulfur metabolizing microbes are often engaged in close symbiotic relationships with other microbes, and even animals. PSB and sulfate reducers form microbial aggregates called “pink berries” in the salt marshes of Massachusetts within which sulfur cycling occurs through the direct exchange of sulfur species. The Vestimentiferan tube worms that grow around hydrothermal vents lack a digestive tract but contain specialized organelles called trophosomes within which autotrophic, sulfide oxidizing bacteria are housed. The tube worms provide the bacteria with sulfide and the bacteria shares the fixed carbon with the worms.

== δ^{34}S ==
Although there are 25 known isotopes of sulfur, only four are stable and of geochemical importance. Of those four, two (^{32}S, light and ^{34}S, heavy) comprise (99.22%) of sulfur on Earth. The vast majority (95.02%) of sulfur occurs as ^{32}S with only 4.21% in ^{34}S. The ratio of these two isotopes is fixed in the Solar System and has been since its formation. The bulk Earth sulfur isotopic ratio is thought to be the same as the ratio of 22.22 measured from the Canyon Diablo troilite (CDT), a meteorite. That ratio is accepted as the international standard and is therefore set at δ = 0.00. Deviation from 0.00 is expressed as the δ^{34}S which is a ratio in per mill (‰). Positive values correlate to increased levels of ^{34}S, whereas negative values correlate with greater ^{32}S in a sample.

Formation of sulfur minerals through non-biogenic processes does not substantially differentiate between the light and heavy isotopes, therefore sulfur isotope ratios in gypsum or barite should be the same as the overall isotope ratio in the water column at their time of precipitation. Sulfate reduction through biologic activity strongly differentiates between the two isotopes because of the more rapid enzymic reaction with ^{32}S. Average present day seawater values of δ^{34}S are on the order of +21‰.

Prior to 2010s, it was thought that sulfate reduction could fractionate sulfur isotopes up to 46 permil and fractionation larger than 46 permil recorded in sediments must be due to disproportionation of sulfur intermediates in the sediment. This view has changed since the 2010s that sulfate reduction can fractionate to 66 permil. As substrates for disproportionation are limited by the product of sulfate reduction, the isotopic effect of disproportionation should be less than 16 permil in most sedimentary settings.

Throughout geologic history the sulfur cycle and the isotopic ratios have coevolved with the biosphere becoming overall more negative with the increases in biologically driven sulfate reduction, but also show substantial positive excursion. In general positive excursions in the sulfur isotopes mean that there is an excess of pyrite deposition rather than oxidation of sulfide minerals exposed on land.

== Marine sulfur cycle ==
The marine sulfur cycle is driven by sulfate reduction because hydrogen sulfide is oxidized by microbes for energy or is oxidized abiotically. Dissimilatory sulfate reduction is driven by the degradation of buried organic matter and anaerobic oxidation of methane (AOM) both of which produce carbon dioxide. At depths where sulfate is depleted, methanogenesis is prevalent. At the sulfate-methane transition zone (SMTZ), the upwelling of methane produced by the methanogens is met by the anaerobic methanotrophic archaea in the SMTZ which oxidize it using sulfate as an electron acceptor. More sulfate is present at the SMTZ than methane. A 4:1 ratio of sulfate: methane is observed and the excess sulfate is directed towards organic matter degradation. Syntrophic aggregates of sulfate reducers and methanotrophs have been discovered and the underlying mechanisms observed include direct interspecies electron transfer using large multi heme complexes.

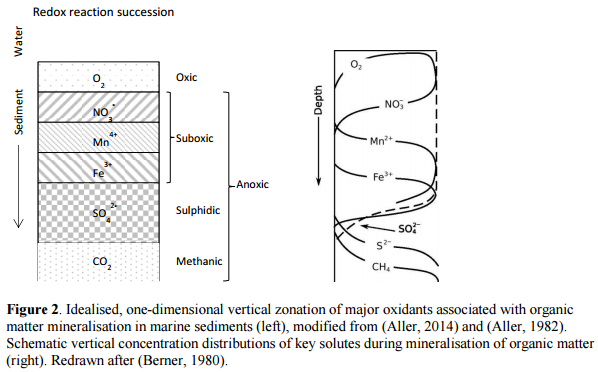
Oxidant concentrations at different depths in marine sediments

Sulfide produced by sulfate reduction can be oxidized by iron minerals to make iron sulfides and pyrite or used as electron donor or to sulfurize organic matter by microbes. Pyrite is formed through two pathways: the polysulfide and the hydrogen sulfide pathway. The polysulfide pathway is dominant until the depletion of elemental sulfur since elemental sulfur is necessary in the formation of polysulfides, then the hydrogen sulfide pathway takes over. Microbial sulfur oxidation utilizes multiple oxidants because the concentrations of the electron acceptors are depth dependent. In the upper sediment layers oxygen and nitrate are the preferred oxidants because of the high energy yield from the reaction, and in the suboxic zones iron and manganese take on the role. Sulfide oxidation yields various sulfur intermediates such as elemental sulfur, thiosulfate, sulfite, and sulfate.The sulfur intermediates formed during sulfide oxidation are unique to this process and thus are indicative of sulfide oxidation when found in environmental samples. Sulfur isotope fractionation of these intermediates and other sulfur species has been a useful tool in the study of sulfide oxidation.

The sulfur cycle in marine environments has been well-studied via the tool of sulfur isotope systematics expressed as δ^{34}S. The modern global oceans have sulfur storage of 1.3×10^{18} kg, mainly occurring as sulfate with the δ^{34}S value of +21‰. The overall input flux is 1.0×10^{11} kg/a with the sulfur isotope composition of ~3‰. Riverine sulfate derived from the terrestrial weathering of sulfide minerals (δ^{34}S = +6‰) is the primary input of sulfur to the oceans. Other sources are metamorphic and volcanic degassing and hydrothermal activity (δ^{34}S = 0‰), which release reduced sulfur species (such as H_{2}S and S^{0}). There are two major outputs of sulfur from the oceans. The first sink is the burial of sulfate either as marine evaporites (such as gypsum) or carbonate-associated sulfate (CAS), which accounts for 6×10^{10} kg/a (δ^{34}S = +21‰). The second sulfur sink is pyrite burial in shelf sediments or deep seafloor sediments (4×10^{10} kg/a; δ^{34}S = −20‰). The total marine sulfur output flux is 1.0×10^{11} kg/a which matches the input fluxes, implying the modern marine sulfur budget is at steady state. The residence time of sulfur in modern global oceans is 13,000,000 years.

Sulfurization of organic matter is a significant sulfur pool, containing 35-80% of the reduced sulfur in marine sediments. These organo-sulfur molecules are also desulfurized to release oxidized sulfur species like sulfite and sulfate. This desulfurization may allow degradation of the organic matter and thus this process determines if the organic matter is assimilated or buried. Sulfurization increases molecular weight and introduces a new moiety to the organic molecule which may inhibit its recognition by catabolic enzymes that degrade organic matter. Microbial ability for desulfurization is reflected by the presence of sulfatase genes.

== Evolution of the sulfur cycle ==
The isotopic composition of sedimentary sulfides provides primary information on the evolution of the sulfur cycle.

The total inventory of sulfur compounds on the surface of the Earth (nearly 10^{19} kg of sulfur) represents the total outgassing of sulfur through geologic time. Rocks analyzed for sulfur content are generally organic-rich shales meaning they are likely controlled by biogenic sulfur reduction. Average seawater curves are generated from evaporites deposited throughout geologic time because again, since they do not discriminate between the heavy and light sulfur isotopes, they should mimic the ocean composition at the time of deposition.

4.6 billion years ago (Ga) the Earth formed and had a theoretical δ^{34}S value of 0. Since there was no biologic activity on early Earth there would be no isotopic fractionation. All sulfur in the atmosphere would be released during volcanic eruptions. When the oceans condensed on Earth, the atmosphere was essentially swept clean of sulfur gases, owing to their high solubility in water. Throughout the majority of the Archean (4.6–2.5 Ga) most systems appeared to be sulfate-limited. Some small Archean evaporite deposits require that at least locally elevated concentrations (possibly due to local volcanic activity) of sulfate existed in order for them to be supersaturated and precipitate out of solution.

3.8–3.6 Ga marks the beginning of the exposed geologic record because this is the age of the oldest rocks on Earth. Metasedimentary rocks from this time still have an isotopic value of 0 because the biosphere was not developed enough (possibly at all) to fractionate sulfur.

3.5 Ga anoxyogenic photosynthesis is established and provides a weak source of sulfate to the global ocean with sulfate concentrations incredibly low the δ^{34}S is still basically 0. Shortly after, at 3.4 Ga the first evidence for minimal fractionation in evaporitic sulfate in association with magmatically derived sulfides can be seen in the rock record. This fractionation shows possible evidence for anoxygenic phototrophic bacteria.

2.8 Ga marks the first evidence for oxygen production through photosynthesis. This is important because there cannot be sulfur oxidation without oxygen in the atmosphere. This exemplifies the coevolution of the oxygen and sulfur cycles as well as the biosphere.

2.7–2.5 Ga is the age of the oldest sedimentary rocks to have a depleted δ ^{34}S which provide the first compelling evidence for sulfate reduction.

2.3 Ga sulfate increases to more than 1 mM; this increase in sulfate is coincident with the "Great Oxygenation Event", when redox conditions on Earth's surface are thought by most workers to have shifted fundamentally from reducing to oxidizing. This shift would have led to an incredible increase in sulfate weathering which would have led to an increase in sulfate in the oceans. The large isotopic fractionations that would likely be associated with bacteria reduction are produced for the first time. Although there was a distinct rise in seawater sulfate at this time it was likely still only less than 5–15% of present-day levels.

At 1.8 Ga, Banded iron formations (BIF) are common sedimentary rocks throughout the Archean and Paleoproterozoic; their disappearance marks a distinct shift in the chemistry of ocean water. BIFs have alternating layers of iron oxides and chert. BIFs only form if the water is allowed to supersaturate in dissolved iron (Fe^{2+}) meaning there cannot be free oxygen or sulfur in the water column because it would form Fe^{3+} (rust) or pyrite and precipitate out of solution. Following this supersaturation, the water must become oxygenated in order for the ferric rich bands to precipitate it must still be sulfur poor otherwise pyrite would form instead of Fe^{3+}. It has been hypothesized that BIFs formed during the initial evolution of photosynthetic organisms that had phases of population growth, causing over production of oxygen. Due to this over production they would poison themselves causing a mass die off, which would cut off the source of oxygen and produce a large amount of CO_{2} through the decomposition of their bodies, allowing for another bacterial bloom. After 1.8 Ga sulfate concentrations were sufficient to increase rates of sulfate reduction to greater than the delivery flux of iron to the oceans.

Along with the disappearance of BIF, the end of the Paleoproterozoic also marks the first large scale sedimentary exhalative deposits showing a link between mineralization and a likely increase in the amount of sulfate in sea water. In the Paleoproterozoic the sulfate in seawater had increased to an amount greater than in the Archean, but was still lower than present day values. The sulfate levels in the Proterozoic also act as proxies for atmospheric oxygen because sulfate is produced mostly through weathering of the continents in the presence of oxygen. The low levels in the Proterozoic simply imply that levels of atmospheric oxygen fell between the abundances of the Phanerozoic and the deficiencies of the Archean.

750 million years ago (Ma) there is a renewed deposition of BIF which marks a significant change in ocean chemistry. This was likely due to snowball Earth episodes where the entire globe including the oceans was covered in a layer of ice cutting off oxygenation. In the late Neoproterozoic high carbon burial rates increased the atmospheric oxygen level to >10% of its present-day value. In the Latest Neoproterozoic another major oxidizing event occurred on Earth's surface that resulted in an oxic deep ocean and possibly allowed for the appearance of multicellular life.

During the last 600 million years, seawater SO_{4} has generally varied between +10‰ and +30‰ in δ^{34}S, with an average value close to that of today. Notably changes in seawater δ^{34}S occurred during extinction and climatic events during this time.

Over a shorter time scale (ten million years) changes in the sulfur cycle are easier to observe and can be even better constrained with oxygen isotopes. Oxygen is continually incorporated into the sulfur cycle through sulfate oxidation and then released when that sulfate is reduced once again. Since different sulfate sources within the ocean have distinct oxygen isotopic values it may be possible to use oxygen to trace the sulfur cycle. Biological sulfate reduction preferentially selects lighter oxygen isotopes for the same reason that lighter sulfur isotopes are preferred. By studying oxygen isotopes in ocean sediments over the last 10 million years were able to better constrain the sulfur concentrations in sea water through that same time. They found that the sea level changes due to Pliocene and Pleistocene glacial cycles changed the area of continental shelves which then disrupted the sulfur processing, lowering the concentration of sulfate in the sea water. This was a drastic change as compared to preglacial times before 2 million years ago.

== The Great Oxidation Event and sulfur isotope mass-independent fractionation ==
Mass independent fractionation of sulfur isotopes in achean sediments: strong evidence for an anoxic archean atmosphere.

The Great Oxygenation Event (GOE) is characterized by the disappearance of sulfur isotope mass-independent fractionation (MIF) in the sedimentary records at around 2.45 billion years ago (Ga). The MIF of sulfur isotope (Δ^{33}S) is defined by the deviation of measured δ^{33}S value from the δ^{33}S value inferred from the measured δ^{34}S value according to the mass dependent fractionation law. The Great Oxidation Event represented a massive transition of global sulfur cycles. Before the Great Oxidation Event, the sulfur cycle was heavily influenced by the ultraviolet (UV) radiation and the associated photochemical reactions, which induced the sulfur isotope mass-independent fractionation (Δ^{33}S ≠ 0). The preservation of sulfur isotope mass-independent fractionation signals requires the atmospheric O_{2} lower than 10^{−5} of present atmospheric level (PAL). The disappearance of sulfur isotope mass-independent fractionation at ~2.45 Ga indicates that atmospheric pO_{2} exceeded 10^{−5} present atmospheric level after the Great Oxygenation Event. Oxygen played an essential role in the global sulfur cycles after the Great Oxygenation Event, such as oxidative weathering of sulfides. The burial of pyrite in sediments in turn contributes to the accumulation of free O_{2} in Earth's surface environment.

== Economic importance ==
Sulfur is intimately involved in the production of fossil fuels and most metal deposits because it acts as an oxidizing or reducing agent. The vast majority of the major mineral deposits on Earth contain a substantial amount of sulfur including, but not limited to sedimentary exhalative deposits (SEDEX), Carbonate-hosted lead-zinc ore deposits (Mississippi Valley-Type MVT), and porphyry copper deposits. Iron sulfides, galena, and sphalerite will form as by-products of hydrogen sulfide generation as long as the respective transition or base metals are present or transported to a sulfate reduction site. If the system runs out of reactive hydrocarbons, economically viable elemental sulfur deposits may form. Sulfur also acts as a reducing agent in many natural gas reservoirs, and generally, ore-forming fluids have a close relationship with ancient hydrocarbon seeps or vents.

Important sources of sulfur in ore deposits are generally deep-seated, but they can also come from local country rocks, seawater, or marine evaporites. The presence or absence of sulfur is one of the limiting factors in the concentration of precious metals and their precipitation from solution. pH, temperature and especially redox states determine whether sulfides will precipitate. Most sulfide brines will remain in concentration until they reach reducing conditions, a higher pH, or lower temperatures.

Ore fluids are generally linked to metal-rich waters that have been heated within a sedimentary basin under elevated thermal conditions, typically in extensional tectonic settings. The redox conditions of the basin lithologies exert an important control on the redox state of the metal-transporting fluids, and deposits can form from both oxidizing and reducing fluids. Metal-rich ore fluids tend to be, by necessity, comparatively sulfide deficient, so a substantial portion of the sulfide must be supplied from another source at the site of mineralization. Bacterial reduction of seawater sulfate or a euxinic (anoxic and H_{2}S-containing) water column is a necessary source of that sulfide. When present, the δ^{34}S values of barite are generally consistent with a seawater sulfate source, suggesting baryte formation by reaction between hydrothermal barium and sulfate in ambient seawater.

Once fossil fuels or precious metals are discovered and either burned or milled, sulfur becomes a waste product that must be dealt with properly, or it can become a pollutant. The burning of fossil fuels has greatly increased the amount of sulfur in our present-day atmosphere. Sulfur acts as a pollutant and an economic resource at the same time.

== Human impact ==
Human activities have a major effect on the global sulfur cycle. The burning of coal, natural gas, and other fossil fuels has greatly increased the amount of sulfur in the atmosphere and ocean and depleted the sedimentary rock sink. Without human impact sulfur would stay tied up in rocks for millions of years until it was uplifted through tectonic events and then released through erosion and weathering processes. Instead it is being drilled, pumped and burned at a steadily increasing rate. Over the most polluted areas there has been a 30-fold increase in sulfate deposition.

Although the sulfur curve shows shifts between net sulfur oxidation and net sulfur reduction in the geologic past, the magnitude of the current human impact is probably unprecedented in the geologic record. Human activities greatly increase the flux of sulfur to the atmosphere, some of which is transported globally. Humans are mining coal and extracting petroleum from the Earth's crust at a rate that mobilizes 150 × 10^{12} gS/yr, which is more than double the rate of 100 years ago. The result of human impact on these processes is to increase the pool of oxidized sulfur (SO_{4}) in the global cycle, at the expense of the storage of reduced sulfur in the Earth's crust. Therefore, human activities do not cause a major change in the global pools of sulfur, but they do produce massive changes in the annual flux of sulfur through the atmosphere.

When SO_{2} is emitted as an air pollutant, it forms sulfuric acid through reactions with water in the atmosphere. Once the acid is completely dissociated in water the pH can drop to 4.3 or lower causing damage to both man-made and natural systems. According to the EPA, acid rain is a broad term referring to a mixture of wet and dry deposition (deposited material) from the atmosphere containing higher than normal amounts of nitric and sulfuric acids. Distilled water (water without any dissolved constituents), which contains no carbon dioxide, has a neutral pH of 7. Rain naturally has a slightly acidic pH of 5.6, because carbon dioxide and water in the air react together to form carbonic acid, a very weak acid. Around Washington, D.C., however, the average rain pH is between 4.2 and 4.4. Since pH is on a log scale dropping by 1 (the difference between normal rain water and acid rain) has a dramatic effect on the strength of the acid. In the United States, roughly two thirds of all SO_{2} and one fourth of all NO_{3} come from electric power generation that relies on burning fossil fuels, like coal.

As it is an important nutrient for plants, sulfur is increasingly used as a component of fertilizers. Recently sulfur deficiency has become widespread in many countries in Europe. Because of actions taken to limit acid rains atmospheric inputs of sulfur continue to decrease, As a result, the deficit in the sulfur input is likely to increase unless sulfur fertilizers are used.

== See also ==
- Sulfur metabolism
- Microbial metabolism
- Sulfide intrusion
- Sulfate-reducing microorganisms
- Redox
- Sulfur
