= Carbonate-associated sulfate =

Sulfate associated with biogenic and abiotic carbonate minerals

Carbonate-associated sulfates (CAS) are sulfate species found in association with carbonate minerals, either as inclusions, adsorbed phases, or in distorted sites within the carbonate mineral lattice. It is derived primarily from dissolved sulfate in the solution from which the carbonate precipitates. In the ocean, the source of this sulfate is a combination of riverine and atmospheric inputs, as well as the products of marine hydrothermal reactions and biomass remineralisation. CAS is a common component of most carbonate rocks, having concentrations in the parts per thousand within biogenic carbonates and parts per million within abiogenic carbonates. Through its abundance and sulfur isotope composition, it provides a valuable record of the global sulfur cycle across time and space.

== Importance of sulfur (and CAS) to biogeochemistry ==
Sulfur compounds play a major role in global climate, nutrient cycling, and the production and distribution of biomass. They can have significant effects on cloud formation and greenhouse forcing, and their distribution responds to the oxidation state of the atmosphere and oceans, as well as the evolution of different metabolic strategies. We can resolve the response of sulfur to biogeochemical change by measuring the abundance and isotopic composition of different sulfur species in different environments at different times.

But how do abundance and isotopic composition of different sulfur reservoirs inform our understanding of biogeochemical processes? The oxidation and reduction of sulfur species often involves the breakage or formation of chemical bonds involving S atoms. Because the thermodynamic stability of certain bonds is often greater when they involve heavier isotopes, an oxidation or reduction reaction can enrich the reactant pool (reservoir) or product pool in compounds containing the heavier isotope, relative to each other. This is known as an isotope effect. The extent to which such a mass-dependent reaction operates in the world's oceans or atmosphere determines how much heavier or lighter various reservoirs of sulfur species will become.

The largest sulfur pool on Earth is that of marine or "seawater" sulfate. Traditionally, the isotopic composition of seawater sulfate is obtained by analysis of sulfate minerals within evaporites, which are somewhat sparse in the geologic record, often poorly preserved, and necessarily associated with complicated and excursive events such as local sea level change. Marine barites are similarly limited. Carbonate-associated sulfate (CAS) provides geochemists with a more ubiquitous source of material for the direct measurement of seawater sulfate, provided the degree of secondary alteration and diagenetic history of the carbonate and CAS can be constrained.

== Sulfate and the global sulfur cycle ==
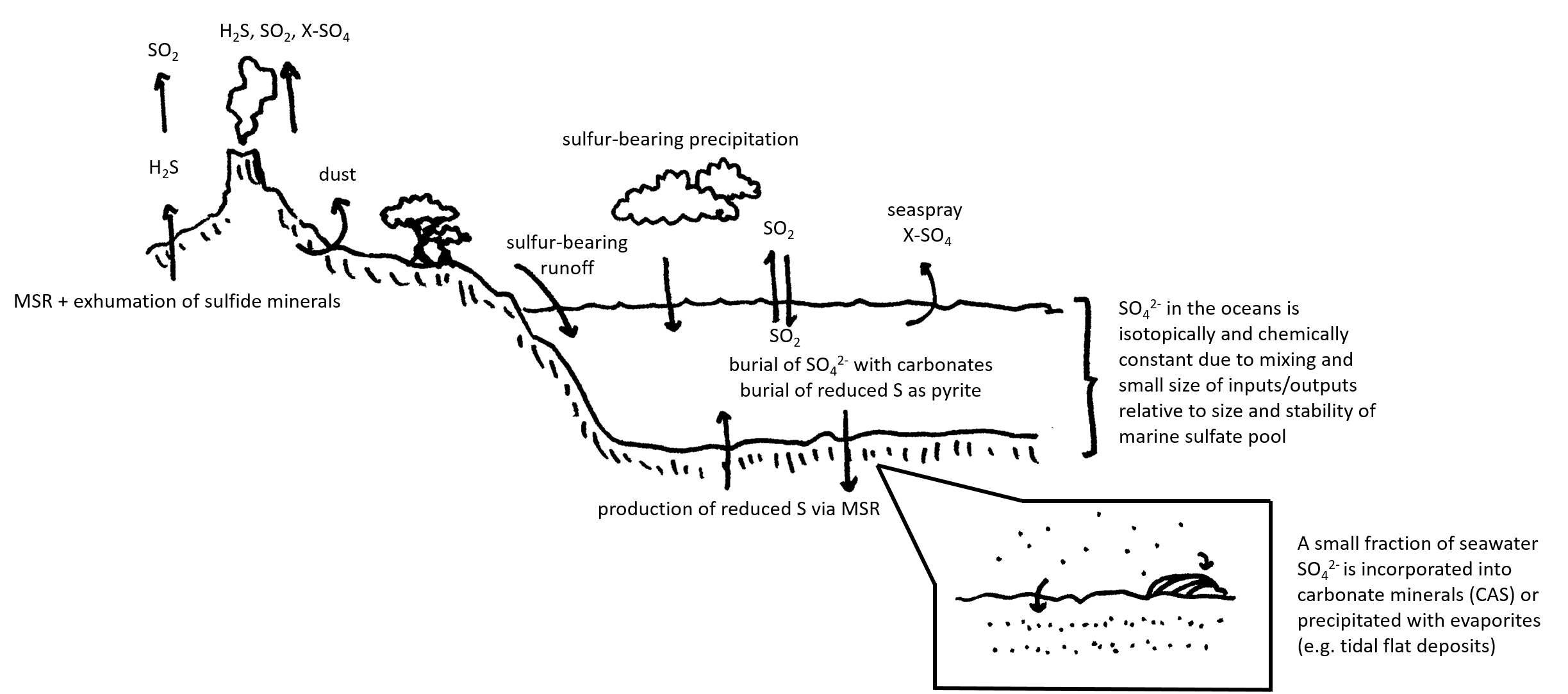
A cartoon/schematic of the sulfur cycle, describing inputs and outputs for seawater sulfate.

Earth's sulfur cycle is complex. Volcanoes release both reduced and oxidized sulfur species into the atmosphere, where they are further oxidized by reaction with oxygen to SO_{2} and various sulfates. These oxidized sulfur species enter groundwater and the oceans both directly (rain/snow) or by incorporation into biomass, which decays to sulfates and sulfides, again by a combination of biological and abiological processes. Some of this sulfate is reduced through microbial metabolism (microbial sulfate reduction or MSR) or by hydrothermal processes, yielding sulfides, thiosulfate, and elemental sulfur. Some reduced sulfur species are buried as metal-sulfide compounds, some are cyclically reduced and oxidized in the oceans and sediments indefinitely, and some are oxidized back into sulfate minerals, which precipitate out in tidal flats, lakes, and lagoons as evaporite deposits or are incorporated into the structure of carbonate and phosphate minerals in the ocean (i.e. as CAS).

Because oxidation-reduction reactions with sulfur species are often accompanied by mass-dependent fractionation, the sulfur isotope composition of the various pools of reduced and oxidized sulfur species in the water column, sediment, and rock record is a clue to how sulfur moves between those pools or has moved in the past. For example, sulfur at the time of Earth's formation should have (barring some accretion-related fractionation process for which there is little evidence) had a δ^{34}S value of about 0‰, while sulfate in the modern oceans (the dominant marine sulfur species) has a δ^{34}S of about +21‰. This implies that, over geologic time, a reservoir of correspondingly depleted (i.e. ^{34}S-poor) sulfur was buried in the crust and possibly subducted into the deep mantle. This is because sulfate's reduction to sulfide is typically accompanied by a negative isotope effect, which (depending on the sulfate-reducing microorganism's enzymatic machinery, temperature, and other factors) can be tens of per mille. This effect can be compounded through sulfur disproportionation, a process by which some microbes reduce sulfate to sulfides and thiosulfate, both of which can be ^{34}S-depleted by tens of per mille relative to the starting sulfate pool. Depleted sulfides and thiosulfate can then be repeatedly oxidized and reduced again, until the final, total sulfide pool that is measured has δ^{34}S values of -70 or -80‰. The formation of a "lighter" S-isotope pool leaves behind an enriched pool, and so the enrichment of seawater sulfate is taken as evidence that some large amount of reduced sulfur (in the form, perhaps, of metal-sulfide minerals) was buried and incorporated into the crust.

== Recording seawater sulfate ==
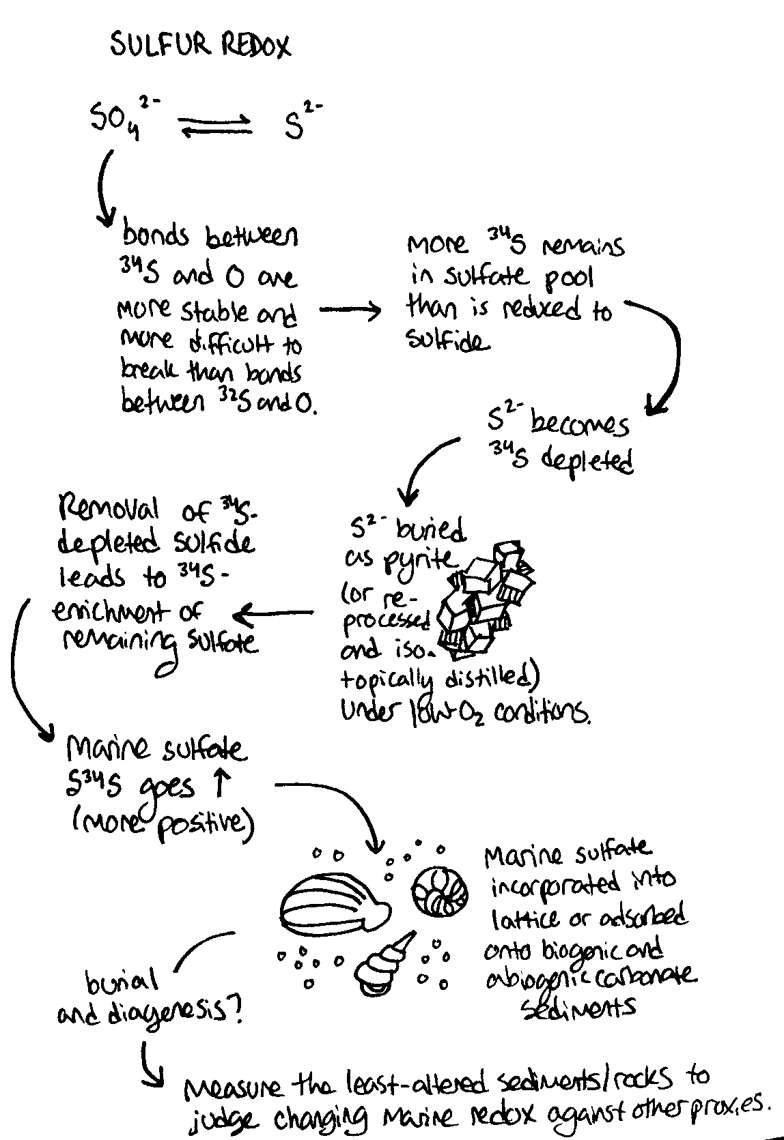
Simple flowchart describing how equilibrium sulfur isotope fractionation might be expressed in the marine sulfate pool through geologic time.

Carbonate-associated sulfate (CAS) represents a small fraction of seawater sulfate, buried (and to some extent, preserved) with carbonate sediments. Thus, the changing δ^{34}S value of CAS through time should theoretically scale with the changing amount of reduced sulfur species being buried as metal-sulfides and the correspondingly enriched ocean. The enrichment of marine sulfate in ^{34}S should in turn scale with things like: the level of oxygen in the oceans and atmosphere, the initial appearance and proliferation of sulfur-reducing metabolisms among the world's microbial communities, and perhaps local-scale climate events and tectonism. The more positive the δ^{34}S of marine sulfate, the more sulfate reduction and/or burial/removal of reduced, ^{34}S-depleted sulfur species must be occurring.

There are some limitations, however, to the use of carbonate-associated sulfate's isotopic composition as a proxy for the isotopic composition of marine sulfate (and thus as a proxy for the response of the sulfur cycle to major climatological and geobiological events) through time. First, there is the question of: how representative is a particular carbonate rock's CAS of marine sulfate at the time of the rock's deposition? Various diagenetic processes (meaning: deformation by burial and exhumation, exposure to groundwater and meteoric fluids carrying sulfur species from more modern sources, etc.) can alter the abundance and isotopic composition of CAS. And so, carbonate mineral crystals used as a sulfur cycle proxy must be carefully selected to avoid highly altered or recrystallized material.

Significant to this problem is the position that carbonate-associated sulfate occupies in the structure of carbonate minerals. X-ray diffraction and reflectance spectroscopy have revealed how the replacement of the carbonate group with sulfate ion tetrahedra expands the crystal lattice. (It follows that higher Mg-content in the carbonate, which itself depends on the ocean's weathering inputs, pH, etc. and increases the distortion of the crystal lattice and rock volume, can also allow for the incorporation of more sulfate into the mineral structure.) Any processes that further distort the crystal lattice can cause sulfate to be lost from or added to the carbonate mineral, possibly overprinting the marine sulfate signal from the time of deposition.

On balance, CAS preserves and records the isotopic composition of seawater sulfate at the time of its deposition, provided the host carbonate has not been completely recrystallized or undergone replacement via sulfur-bearing fluids after burial. If the host carbonate has been altered in this way, CAS may contain a mixture of signals that is difficult to characterize.

== Measuring ==
=== Measuring abundance ===
In measuring the abundance and isotopic composition of CAS, it is important to know exactly what is being measured: CAS within particular shell fragments, corals, microbialites, cements, or otherwise. The first step is therefore to separate out the desired component for measurement. This could mean drilling and powdering a rock (if the CAS measurement of the whole rock is desired) or sorting sediments by visual identification of particular microfossils or mineral phases, using fine tweezers and drills under a microscope. The fragments, sediments, or powders should be cleaned (likely by sonication) and exposed only to deionized and filtered water, so that no contaminant sulfur species are introduced, and the original CAS is not further reduced, oxidized, or otherwise altered. Next, the clean samples must be measured.

In one method, these samples are "digested" in an acid, likely HCl, which will liberate CAS from inclusions or the mineral lattice by dissolving the calcite mineral. The resulting sulfate ions are precipitated (often by mixture with barium chloride to produce barium sulfate), and the solid sulfate precipitate is filtered, dried, and transferred to an elemental analysis pipeline, which may involve the combustion of the sample and the mass balance of its various combustion products (which should include CO_{2} and SO_{2}). Knowledge of the ratio of sulfur to oxygen and other components in the elemental analysis pipeline allows one to calculate the amount of sulfate introduced to the pipeline by the sample. This, along with the precise measurement of the original sample's mass and volume, yields a sulfate concentration for the original sample. The "combustion" and reaction to SO_{2} can also bypassed by instead passing the acid-dissolved sample through an ion chromatography column, wherein different ions' polarity determines the strength of their interactions with polymers in the column, such that they are retained in the column for different amounts of time.

The concentration of CAS may also be measured by spectroscopic methods. This could mean using the characteristic X-ray-induced fluorescence of sulfur, oxygen, carbon, and other elements in the sample to determine the abundance and ratios of each component, or the energy spectrum of an electron beam transmitted through the sample.

It is also important to calibrate your measurement using standards of a known sulfate concentration, so that the strength/intensity of the signal associated with each sample can be mapped to a particular abundance.

=== Measuring isotopic composition ===
The abundance of CAS in a particular sample depends as much on the circumstances of a particular carbonate rock's formation and diagenetic history as it does on the processes acting on the marine sulfate pool that generated it. Thus, it is important to have both the abundance/concentration of CAS in a sample and its isotopic composition to understand its place in the marine sulfate record. As mentioned above, different biogeochemical processes produce different isotope effects under equilibrium and disequilibrium conditions: microbial sulfur reduction and sulfur disproportionation can produce equilibrium and kinetic isotope effects of many 10s of per mille. The sulfur isotope composition of the ocean (or a lake, lagoon, or other body) is critical to understanding the extent to which those processes controlled the global sulfur cycle throughout the past. Just as the carbon and oxygen isotope composition of the carbonate host rock can illuminate temperature and local climate history, the sulfur and oxygen isotope composition of CAS can illuminate the cause and effect relationships between that history and the sulfur cycle. Isotopic composition of CAS and carbonate host rock can both be measured by "elemental analysis" wherein sulfate or carbonate is "burned" or otherwise volatilized and the ionized isotopes are accelerated along a path, the length and duration of which is a function of their masses. The ratio of different isotopes to one another is assessed by comparison to blanks and standards. However, SO_{2}, the analyte used in this method, presents some difficulties as the isotopic composition of the component oxygen may also vary, affecting the mass measurement. SO_{2} can also "stick" to or react with other compounds in the mass spectrometer line. Thus, if high precision is needed, sulfate samples are reduced to sulfides, which are then fluorinated to produce the inert and stable-isotopologue-free compound SF_{6}, which can be passed through a specialized mass spectrometer. These methods, mass spectrometry and clumped isotope mass spectrometry, are discussed in greater detail in their primary articles.

The isotopic composition of CAS is often discussed in terms of δ^{34}S, which is a way of expressing the ratio of the isotope ^{34}S to ^{32}S in a sample, relative to a standard such as the Canyon Diablo Troilite. δ^{34}S (expressed in ‰) is equal to $\left [ \frac{(^{34}S/^{32}S)_{sample}}{(^{34}S/^{32}S)_{standard}}-1 \right ]*1000$. The isotope effect of a particular process (microbial sulfate reduction, for example) is often expressed as an ε value (also in ‰) which refers to the difference in the δ value of the reactant pool and the product pool.

While studies of the sulfur isotope composition of seawater sulfate, CAS, marine barite, and evaporites typically discuss the relative ^{34}S enrichment of depletion of these pools, there are other minor but stable isotopes of sulfur that can also be measured, though to lower precision given their rarity. These include ^{33}S and ^{36}S. Mass-dependent and mass-independent fractionation of minor sulfur isotopes may also be an important gauge for the sulfur cycle through geologic time. ^{33}S and ^{36}S must, however, be measured at high-precision via fluorination to SF_{6} before passing through a mass spectrometer.

== Interpreting measurements ==
Interpreting the sulfur isotope composition of CAS can be complex. As discussed above, if seawater sulfate at a particular horizon in the geologic record gets heavier (i.e. more enriched in ^{34}S relative to seawater sulfate before it) that could mean that the ^{34}S-depleted products of sulfur-reducing reactions are being buried as sulfide minerals and removed from the oceans, possibly because of an instance of ocean anoxia or an increase in dissimilatory sulfate reduction by marine microorganisms. But it could also mean that the CAS measured at that particular horizon was derived not from seawater sulfate at the time of carbonate deposition, but from fluids moving through the sediment or porous rock from a later time, in which sulfate could have been enriched by processes in a more oxidizing world. It could mean that there is a hitherto uncharacterized kinetic isotope effect associated with the incorporation of sulfate into a particular carbonate texture (shrubs vs. nodules vs. acicular cements vs. other conformations). Distinguishing between the effects of true changes in ancient ocean dynamics/chemistry and the effects of early- and late-stage diagenesis on CAS isotope composition is possible only through careful analyses that: compare the CAS record to the seawater sulfate record preserved in evaporites and marine barite, and carefully screen samples for their thermodynamic stability and evidence of alteration. Such samples could include brachiopod shell fragments (which are made of stable, low-Mg calcite that visibly resists alteration after cementation).

== Some important insights from CAS studies ==
The CAS record can preserve evidence of major changes in oxidation state of the ocean in response to climate. For example, the Great Oxygenation Event led to the oxidation of reduced sulfur species, increasing the flux of sulfate into the oceans. This led to a corresponding depletion of ^{34}S in the marine sulfate pool — a depletion recorded in the sulfur isotope composition of marginal marine evaporite deposits and CAS in marine carbonates.

Before the Great Oxygenation Event, when atmospheric and marine oxygen was low, it is expected that oxidized sulfur species like sulfate would have been much less abundant. Exactly how much less may be estimated from the δ^{34}S value of sediments in modern analog environments like anoxic lakes, and their comparison to preserved Archean-age seawater sulfate (as found in CAS).

The Great Oxygenation Event lead not just to the oxygenation of Earth's oceans, but to the development of the ozone layer. Prior to this, the Archean Earth was exposed to high-energy radiation that caused mass-independent fractionation of various pools, including sulfur (which would lead to an expected negative δ^{34}S excursion in the marine sulfate pool). The marine sulfate record preserved in CAS complicates this view, as late or Neo-Archean CAS samples seem to have positive δ^{34}S.

The CAS record may (or may not) preserve evidence of the rise of microbial sulfate reduction, in the form of a negative δ^{34}S excursion between 2.7 and 2.5 Ga.

The variation in sulfur isotope composition of sulfate associated with the different components of a carbonate or phosphate rock may also provide insights into the diagenetic history of a sample and the degree of preservation of the original texture and chemistry in different types of grains.

== Ongoing improvements to CAS studies ==
Much of the ongoing work in the field of carbonate-associated sulfate is dedicated to characterizing sources of variation in the CAS record, answering questions like: how are sulfate ions incorporated into the mineral structure of different Ca-carbonate and Ca-Mg-carbonate morphotypes, mechanistically speaking? And which morphotypes are most likely to contain CAS derived from primary marine sulfate?

Just as for other geochemical proxies, the utility and reliability of CAS measurements will improve with the advent of more sensitive measurement techniques, and the characterization of more isotope standards.
