= Sulfate-methane transition zone =

The sulfate-methane transition zone (SMTZ) is a zone in oceans, lakes, and rivers typically found below the sediment surface in which sulfate and methane coexist. The formation of a SMTZ is driven by the diffusion of sulfate down the sediment column and the diffusion of methane up the sediments. At the SMTZ, their diffusion profiles meet and sulfate and methane react with one another, which allows the SMTZ to harbor a unique microbial community whose main form of metabolism is anaerobic oxidation of methane (AOM). The presence of AOM marks the transition from dissimilatory sulfate reduction to methanogenesis as the main metabolism utilized by organisms.

The SMTZ is a global feature that can occur at depths that range anywhere from a few millimeters to hundreds of meters below the sediment surface. It tends to span several centimeters, but can also reach widths up to a whole meter. It is characterized by low concentrations of sulfate and methane because the anaerobic oxidation of methane consumes both molecules.

== History ==
It was previously believed that methane and sulfate could not coexist due to the established hierarchy of metabolisms in sediments. In well-oxygenated sediments, oxygen is the main electron acceptor in aerobic respiration. Once all of the oxygen is consumed, organisms begin using substrates like nitrate, manganese oxides, and iron oxides as the electron acceptor in anaerobic respiration. However, these substrates tend to be low in concentrations throughout sediments. Sulfate, on the other hand, is relatively high in abundance in comparison, so sulfate reduction is the main form of respiration after oxygen is consumed. Methanogenesis is the next form of metabolism after sulfate reduction, but was thought to begin only when all the sulfate in the sediments was reduced. However, it was discovered that sulfate reduction and methanogenesis could occur simultaneously in marine sediment in 1977 by Ronald S. Oremland and Barrie F. Taylor. Following this discovery, non-zero concentration of sulfate and methane were found in the same zone in ocean setting, leading Niels Iverson and Bo Barker Jorgenson to investigate the methane oxidation rates in the so-called "sulfate-methane transition" in 1985. Since then, many studies have been conducted to trace the sulfate and methane profiles above, in, and below the SMTZ.

== Metabolic processes ==
All organisms need a metabolic pathway in order to generate energy. In a sediment column, the dominant metabolism used by organisms changes with depth, as the availability of different electron acceptors changes.

=== Above SMTZ ===
After oxygen, nitrate, manganeses, and iron are depleted, sulfate is the main electron acceptor used in anaerobic respiration. The metabolism associated with this is dissimilatory sulfate reduction (DSR) and is carried out by sulfur-reducing bacteria, which are widely distributed in anoxic environments. DSR oxidizes organic carbon using sulfate, and is described by the following equation:

$\ce{SO4^2- +2CH2O -> H2S +2HCO3^-}$.

=== Within SMTZ ===
The main metabolism is anaerobic oxidation of methane (AOM). AOM uses sulfate to oxidize methane into bicarbonate and forms hydrogen sulfide as a byproduct, and is described by the following equation:

$\ce{SO4^2- + CH4 -> HS^- +HCO3^- +H2O}$.

The rate of AOM is pretty slow, with turnover times for the coexisting sulfate and methane in the oceans ranging from weeks to years. This inefficiency can be a result of the small change in free energy associated with the reaction. Highest rates of AOM usually over methane gas seeps. The maximum rates of AOM generally overlap with the maximum rates of sulfate reduction. It has also been proposed that methanogens can also oxidize methane into acetate or carbon dioxide, and not just bicarbonate.

=== Below SMTZ ===
Below the SMTZ, methanogenesis is the main metabolism after AOM. Methanogens are organisms who produce methane and take a carbon source, either carbon dioxide or organic matter, and reduce it to methane through the following reaction:

$\ce{4H2 +CO2->CH4 +2H2O}$.

It is this reaction that leads to the sharp increase in methane concentrations below the SMTZ.

== Geochemistry ==
=== Above SMTZ ===
In most cases, sulfate tends to linearly decrease depth, which mostly reflects the diffusion of sulfate downwards. This diffusion is the main source of sulfate to the SMTZ. The sharper decrease in the sulfate that occurs further down is the result of microorganisms using dissimilatory sulfate reduction, which consumes sulfate.

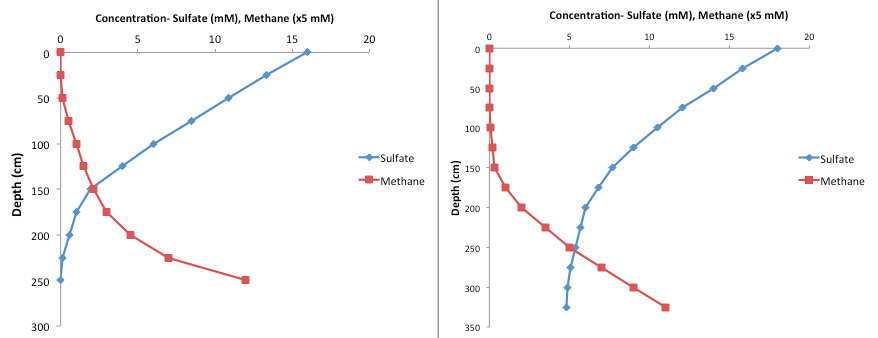
^{Sulfate and methane concentration profiles as observed in the Black Sea by B.B. Jorgensen et al. (2001). Profile on the left crosses an SMT at around 150 cm, while the one on the right crosses at around 250 cm.}

=== Within SMTZ ===
Here, sulfate diffusing down and methane diffusing up coincide, resulting in anaerobic oxidation of methane (AOM). This metabolism take sulfate and methane in a 1:1 ratio and produces certain carbon species (mainly bicarbonate) and sulfide. It is through AOM that sulfate and methane concentrations remain relatively low within the SMTZ.

Sulfate-methane transition zones have various signatures besides the sudden increase of methane at nearly depleted sulfate concentrations. At the SMTZ, there are expected rises in pH, alkalinity, phosphate, and carbonate precipitation rates. A very significant marker of the SMTZ is an elevated concentration of barium ion (Ba^{2+}), which is caused by the dissolution of sedimentary barite, BaSO_{4}. The SMTZ is also partially controlled by the amount of organic matter in the sediments. Higher organic deposition rates tends to push the SMTZ up higher, since a community of organisms will respire more rapidly due to the influx of nutrients provided by organic matter. This drives the accelerated depletion of oxygen and other substrates used for respiration before sulfate towards the top of the sediment column. This would lead sulfate reduction and methanogenesis to occur higher up in the sediment column, bringing up the SMTZ. However, a direct correlation between organic matter deposition rates and SMTZ depth has yet to be established.

=== After SMTZ ===
There is a sharp increase in methane concentrations due to methanogenesis. This microbial metabolism reduces carbon dioxide or organic matter into methane. This region is the source of methane that then diffuses up.

Geochemical profiles of sulfate around the SMTZ, in particular, have been greatly affected by sampling artifacts, like seawater contamination. This is a difficult challenge that has yet to be overcome. Additionally, it has been proposed that AOM cannot account for all of the carbon budget and isotopic variations found in the SMTZ and perhaps. Instead, processes like organic carbon remineralization, where organic carbon is converted into smaller organic compounds or inorganic compounds, could account for some of the missing carbon budget.

== Microbiology ==
=== Above SMTZ ===
DSR is the predominant metabolism, so sulfate reducing bacteria are abundant above the SMTZ. Examples of sulfate-reducing bacteria are green non-sulfur bacteria which are part of the Planctomycetes phylum, Gammaproteobacteria, Betaproteobacteria. The archaeal community is also involved in sulfate reduction above the SMTZ and consists mainly of members of Euryarchaeotal Marine Benthic Group D.

=== Within SMTZ ===
A group of Deltaproteobacteria that reduces sulfate makes up the majority of the bacterial community. The methane oxidizing archaea (ANMEs) found belong to two out of the three phylogenetic groups, ANME-1 and ANME-2. Some of the first organisms found that perform AOM were sulfide-oxidizing bacteria, which surrounded aggregates of methanogenic archaeal cells. AOM is now loosely characterized by the presence of the sulfate-reducing bacteria, Desulfosarcinales, and methane-eating archaea, anaerobic methanotroph (ANME-2), consortia. These organisms have a syntrophic interaction. Other related organisms are ANME-1, which are also anaerobic methanotrophs, but from a different archaeal lineage. Both ANME-1 and ANME-2 are members of the order Methnosarcinales. Sulfate reducing bacteria use a carbon source, like carbon dioxide, and hydrogen excreted by the methanogenic archaea. The bacteria partners are not as specific as the archaea. Desulfosarcinales are more globally widespread so it is still unknown as to whether there is a specific sulfate-reducing bacterial group associated with AOM. The Desulfosarcinales and ANME-2 consortia has now been observed in several locations like along the coast of California, suggesting a significant partnership between the microbial groups. Other common microbial groups that could potentially define a global signature include Planctomycetes, candidate division JS1, Actinobacteria, Crenarchaeota MBGB.

=== Under SMTZ ===
Methanogens, which mainly belong to the Archaea domain, are abundant under the SMTZ. Green non-sulfur bacteria are prevalent, along with the archaeal and bacterial groups found within the SMTZ. There has yet to be a significant difference between the microbial diversity within and under the SMTZ.

It is still difficult to broadly name microbial communities found in all SMTZs because dominant groups are determined by ecological and chemical factors. However, it has been observed that the richness in species is relatively similar across SMTZ horizons, especially within the Deltaproteobacteria. The diversity of archaea and bacteria in the SMTZ vary with depth, but bacteria tend to have richer diversity than the archaea.

== Impacts on global carbon cycle ==
The SMTZ is a major sink for methane because AOM consumes mostly all of the methane produced by methanogens. It has been shown that AOM takes up over 90 percent of all the methane produced in the ocean. Since methane is a prominent greenhouse gas, AOM is especially vital to controlling the amount of greenhouse gases in the atmosphere. Further, the inorganic carbon entering through the SMTZ via AOM, DSR, and from methanogenic depths significantly contributes to marine inorganic carbon pool and sediment carbon burial.

== Isotopes ==
Isotopic mass balance calculations have implied that sulfate reduction and anaerobic oxidation of methane can significantly fractionate sulfur and carbon isotopes. During sulfate reductions, the extent of sulfur fractionation varies depending on the environment and rates of reduction. Slower reduction rates lead to higher fractionations and sulfate concentration below 1 mM lead to lower fractionations. The production and consumption of methane leads to archaeal and bacterial highly depleted in ^{13}C biomarkers, specifically lipids. The bacteria and archaea associated with the SMTZ are very depleted in ^{13}C, with archaea generally being more depleted than bacteria. The dissolved inorganic carbon (DIC) stable isotopes (δ^{13}C) also show depleted signals due to the DIC being sourced from methane oxidation.

Isotopes have also been the main tool to study ancient SMTZs. Paleo-SMTZ have been studied using a ^{34}S isotopic signature. Extremely ^{34}S depleted pyrite forms from the pore water sulfide, or the by product of AOM. Thus, depleted sulfur values are correlated to AOM and suggests the presence of a SMTZ. Additionally, carbonates within an SMTZ might form from the bicarbonate released during AOM and would record depleted ^{13}C isotope ratios expected from AOM.
