= Dissimilatory sulfate reduction =

Form of anaerobic respiration where sulfate is the terminal electron acceptor

Overview of dissimilatory sulfate reduction performed by sulfate-reducing microorganisms.

Dissimilatory sulfate reduction is a form of anaerobic respiration that uses sulfate as the terminal electron acceptor to produce hydrogen sulfide. This metabolism is found in some types of bacteria and archaea which are often termed sulfate-reducing organisms. The term "dissimilatory" is used when hydrogen sulfide (H_{2}S) is produced in an anaerobic respiration process. By contrast, the term "assimilatory" would be used in relation to the biosynthesis of organosulfur compounds, even though hydrogen sulfide may be an intermediate.

Dissimilatory sulfate reduction occurs in four steps:

1. Conversion (activation) of sulfate to adenosine 5’-phosphosulfate (APS) via sulfate adenylyltransferase
2. Reduction of APS to sulfite via adenylyl-sulfate reductase
3. Transfer of the sulfur atom of sulfite to the DsrC protein creating a trisulfide intermediate catalyzed by DsrAB
4. Reduction of the trisulfide to sulfide and reduced DsrC via a membrane bound enzyme, DsrMKJOP

Which requires the consumption of a single ATP molecule and the input of 8 electrons (e^{−}).

The protein complexes responsible for these chemical conversions — Sat, Apr and Dsr — are found in all currently known organisms that perform dissimilatory sulfate reduction. Energetically, sulfate is a poor electron acceptor for microorganisms as the sulfate-sulfite redox couple has a standard formal reduction potential (E^{0'}) of -516 mV, which is too negative to allow reduction by NADH or ferredoxin that are the primary intracellular electron mediators. To overcome this issue, sulfate is first converted into APS by the enzyme ATP sulfurylase (Sat), at the cost of a single ATP molecule. The APS-sulfite redox couple has an E^{0'} of -60 mV, which allows APS to be reduced by either NADH or reduced ferrodoxin using the enzyme adenylyl-sulfate reductase (Apr), which requires the input of 2 electrons. In the final step, sulfite is reduced by the dissimilatory sulfite reductase (Dsr) to form sulfide, requiring the input of 6 electrons.

== See also ==
- Sulfur cycle
- Sulfur assimilation
