= Isotopes of sulfur =

Isotopes of sulfur (_{16}S)
Main isotopes			Decay	
Isotope	abundance	half-life (t_{1/2})	mode	product
^{32}S	94.8%	stable		
^{33}S	0.760%	stable		
^{34}S	4.37%	stable		
^{35}S	trace	87.37 d	β^{−}	^{35}Cl
^{36}S	0.02%	stable		
^{34}S abundances vary greatly (between 3.96 and 4.77 percent) in natural samples.

Standard atomic weight A_{r}°(S)
- [32.059, 32.076]; 32.06±0.02 (abridged)

Sulfur (_{16}S) has 23 known isotopes with mass numbers ranging from 27 to 49, four of which are stable: ^{32}S (94.85%), ^{33}S (0.76%), ^{34}S (4.37%), and ^{36}S (0.016%). The preponderance of sulfur-32 is explained by its production from carbon-12 plus successive fusion capture of five helium-4 nuclei in the alpha process of nucleosynthesis.

The main radioisotope ^{35}S is formed from cosmic ray spallation of ^{40}Ar in the atmosphere. Other radioactive isotopes of sulfur are all comparatively short-lived. The next longest-lived radioisotope is sulfur-38, with a half-life of 170 minutes. Isotopes lighter than ^{32}S mostly decay to isotopes of phosphorus or silicon, while ^{35}S and heavier radioisotopes decay to isotopes of chlorine.

The beams of several radioactive isotopes (such as those of ^{44}S) have been studied theoretically within the framework of the synthesis of superheavy elements, especially those ones in the vicinity of the island of stability.

When sulfide minerals are precipitated, isotopic equilibration among solids and liquid may cause small differences in the δ^{34}S values of co-genetic minerals. The differences between minerals can be used to estimate the temperature of equilibration. The δ^{13}C and δ^{34}S of coexisting carbonates and sulfides can be used to determine the pH and oxygen fugacity of the ore-bearing fluid during ore formation.

In most forest ecosystems, sulfate is derived mostly from the atmosphere; weathering of ore minerals and evaporites also contribute some sulfur. Sulfur with a distinctive isotopic composition has been used to identify pollution sources, and enriched sulfur has been added as a tracer in hydrologic studies. Differences in the natural abundances can also be used in systems where there is sufficient variation in the ^{34}S of ecosystem components. Rocky Mountain lakes thought to be dominated by atmospheric sources of sulfate have been found to have different δ^{34}S values from oceans believed to be dominated by watershed sources of sulfate.

== List of isotopes ==
Nuclide (Note: ^{m}S – Excited nuclear isomer.)	Z	N	Isotopic mass (Da) (Note: ( ) – Uncertainty (1σ) is given in concise form in parentheses after the corresponding last digits.) (Note: # – Atomic mass marked #: value and uncertainty derived not from purely experimental data, but at least partly from trends from the Mass Surface (TMS).)	Discovery year	Half-life	Decay mode (Note: Modes of decay: IT: / Isomeric transition; n: / Neutron emission; p: / Proton emission)	Daughter isotope (Note: Bold symbol as daughter – Daughter product is stable.)	Spin and parity (Note: ( ) spin value – Indicates spin with weak assignment arguments.) (Note: # – Values marked # are not purely derived from experimental data, but at least partly from trends of neighboring nuclides (TNN).)	Natural abundance (mole fraction)	
Nuclide	Excitation energy			Discovery year	Half-life	Decay mode	Daughter isotope	Spin and parity	Normal proportion	Range of variation
^{27}S	16	11	27.018719(26)	1986	16.3(2) ms	β^{+}, p (61%)	^{26}Si	(5/2+)		
^{27}S	16	11	27.018719(26)	1986	16.3(2) ms	β^{+} (36%)	^{27}P	(5/2+)		
^{27}S	16	11	27.018719(26)	1986	16.3(2) ms	β^{+}, 2p (3.0%)	^{25}Al	(5/2+)		
^{28}S	16	12	28.004488(14)	1982	125(10) ms	β^{+} (79.3%)	^{28}P	0+		
^{28}S	16	12	28.004488(14)	1982	125(10) ms	β^{+}, p (20.7%)	^{27}Si	0+		
^{29}S	16	13	28.996678(14)	1964	188(4) ms	β^{+} (53.6%)	^{29}P	5/2+#		
^{29}S	16	13	28.996678(14)	1964	188(4) ms	β^{+}, p (46.4%)	^{28}Si	5/2+#		
^{30}S	16	14	29.98490677(22)	1961	1.1798(3) s	β^{+}	^{30}P	0+		
^{31}S	16	15	30.97955700(25)	1940	2.5534(18) s	β^{+}	^{31}P	1/2+		
^{32}S (Note: Heaviest theoretically stable nuclide with equal numbers of protons and neutrons)	16	16	31.9720711735(14)	1920	Stable			0+	0.9485(255)	
^{33}S	16	17	32.9714589086(14)	1926	Stable			3/2+	0.00763(20)	
^{34}S	16	18	33.967867011(47)	1926	Stable			0+	0.04365(235)	
^{35}S	16	19	34.969032321(43)	1936	87.37(4) d	β^{−}	^{35}Cl	3/2+	Trace (Note: Cosmogenic)	
^{36}S	16	20	35.96708069(20)	1938	Stable			0+	1.58(17)×10^{−4}	
^{37}S	16	21	36.97112550(21)	1945	5.05(2) min	β^{−}	^{37}Cl	7/2−		
^{38}S	16	22	37.9711633(77)	1958	170.3(7) min	β^{−}	^{38}Cl	0+		
^{39}S	16	23	38.975134(54)	1971	11.5(5) s	β^{−}	^{39}Cl	(7/2)−		
^{40}S	16	24	39.9754826(43)	1971	8.8(22) s	β^{−}	^{40}Cl	0+		
^{41}S	16	25	40.9795935(44)	1979	1.99(5) s	β^{−}	^{41}Cl	7/2−#		
^{42}S	16	26	41.9810651(30)	1979	1.016(15) s	β^{−} (>96%)	^{42}Cl	0+		
^{42}S	16	26	41.9810651(30)	1979	1.016(15) s	β^{−}, n (<1%)	^{41}Cl	0+		
^{43}S	16	27	42.9869076(53)	1979	265(13) ms	β^{−} (60%)	^{43}Cl	3/2−		
^{43}S	16	27	42.9869076(53)	1979	265(13) ms	β^{−}, n (40%)	^{42}Cl	3/2−		
^{43m}S	320.7(5) keV			2000	415.0(26) ns	IT	^{43}S	(7/2−)		
^{44}S	16	28	43.9901188(56)	1979	100(1) ms	β^{−} (82%)	^{44}Cl	0+		
^{44}S	16	28	43.9901188(56)	1979	100(1) ms	β^{−}, n (18%)	^{43}Cl	0+		
^{44m}S	1365.0(8) keV			2010	2.619(26) μs	IT	^{44}S	0+		
^{45}S	16	29	44.99641(32)#	1989	68(2) ms	β^{−}, n (54%)	^{44}Cl	3/2−#		
^{45}S	16	29	44.99641(32)#	1989	68(2) ms	β^{−} (46%)	^{45}Cl	3/2−#		
^{46}S	16	30	46.00069(43)#	1989	50(8) ms	β^{−}	^{46}Cl	0+		
^{47}S	16	31	47.00773(43)#	1989	24# ms [>200 ns]			3/2−#		
^{48}S	16	32	48.01330(54)#	1990	10# ms [>200 ns]			0+		
^{49}S	16	33	49.02189(63)#	2018	4# ms [>400 ns]			1/2−#		
This table header & footer:

== See also ==
- Sulfur isotope biogeochemistry

Daughter products other than sulfur

- Isotopes of chlorine
- Isotopes of phosphorus
- Isotopes of silicon
- Isotopes of aluminum
