= Desulfovibrio arcticus =

Scientific classification
- Domain: Bacteria
- Kingdom: Pseudomonadati
- Phylum: Thermodesulfobacteriota
- Class: Desulfovibrionia
- Order: Desulfovibrionales
- Family: Desulfovibrionaceae
- Genus: Desulfovibrio
- Species: D. arcticus

Binomial name
- Desulfovibrio arcticus Pecheritsyna et al. 2012

Type strain
- B15, DSM 21064, VKM B-2367

Synonyms
- Humidesulfovibrio arcticus (Pecheritsyna et al. 2012) Waite et al. 2020

Desulfovibrio arcticus is a Gram-negative, psychrotolerant, sulfate-reducing and motile bacterium from the genus of Desulfovibrio with a single polar flagellum which has been isolated from water from permafrost from the Barents Sea.

== Taxonomic and Phylogenetic Description ==
Desulfovibrio arcticus is a bacterium belonging to the kingdom Pseudomonadati. It is classified within the phylum Thermodesulfobacteriota and the class Desulfovibrionia. Within this class, it falls under the order Desulfovibrionales and the family Desulfovibrionaceae. D. arcticus belongs to the genus Desulfovibrio, a group of aquatic sulfate-reducing bacteria that have a vital role in the ocean sulfur cycle and in precipitation of dolomite .

Phylogenetic analysis of the 16S rRNA gene sequence from a 1425 base pair fragment of D. arcticus showed that it belonged to the Desulfovibrio genus, sharing its phenotypic and phylogenetic characteristics. Its closest known relatives, found using the NCBI BLAST and the bootstrap test, are D. idahonensis and D. mexicanus, with a similarity of 96.5%, with a 16s rRNA gene sequence similarity of 98.8% and 96.5%, respectively, indicating D. idahonensis as its closest relative. D. idahonensis was found in Lake Coeur d'Alene, Idaho, USA and is characterized by reducing sulfate, sulfite, thiosulfate, elemental sulfur, DMSO, anthraquinone disulfonate and fumarate using lactate as an electron donor. D. mexicanus was isolated from a Mexican UASB digester treating cheese factory wastewater and is characterized as a mesophilic sulfate-reducing bacterium. In comparison, its farthest known species was found to be D. desulfuricans; D. desulfuricans can primarily be carried asymptomatically in the human gastrointestinal tract.

== Description of the Discovery ==
In 2012, Desulfovibrio arcticus was discovered through the isolation of water brine in the Varandey Peninsula, south of the Barents Sea, by Russian researchers S.A. Pecheritsyna, E.M. Rivkina, V.N. Akimov, and V.A. Shcherbakova.

The methods of obtaining Desulfovibrio arcticus consisted of gathering a water sample from a cryopeg at a depth of 9 meters. Cryopegs are defined as a layer of unfrozen ground with highly saline water that form parts of permafrost layers. Some of these permafrost layers are thousands of years old, making them important in identifying past microbial life living in these extreme habitats and in discovering how they carry out metabolic processes within them. The sample was gathered in 2004 and was frozen (-20 °C) for 2 months until an analysis was performed. Isolation and enrichment were performed with a basal growth medium (BSG), enriched for sulfate-reducing bacteria under strictly anaerobic conditions. It consisted of 10 ml trace element solution (SL-10), 5 mL vitamin solution, 0.33 g KH_{2}PO_{4}, 0.33 g KCl, 5.0 g NaCl, 0.33 g NH_{4}Cl, 0.33 g MgCl_{2}, 6H_{2}O, 0.33 g CaCl_{2}, 4.0 g Na_{2}SO_{4}, and 0.002 g resazurin. Resazurin was used as an indicator for anaerobic conditions. The media was used to approximate the natural conditions of salty permafrost brine. Before analysis, the sample was inoculated and amplified using 25 mL NaHCO_{3}, 10 mL sodium lactate, and 2.5 mL HCl. The lactate was used to select for organisms that could metabolize the B15^{T} strain since it strongly enriches sulfate-reducing bacteria like Desulfovibrio. In addition, the tenfold serial dilution method was utilized. The pure cultures were then maintained at 24 °C in a modified BGM of 0.2% NaCl that allowed for stable isolation to conduct physiological and phylogenetic characterization. The cells were observed through phase-contrast and electron microscopes to accurately identify different aspects of the organism's structure and physical features, such as the presence of flagella, and confirm it as a Desulfovibrio species.

B15^{T} was tested for desulfoviridin with E.coli and D. desulfuricans as negative and positive controls. The growth of B15^{T} was tested and supplemented with 20 mM sulfate and 20 mM sodium lactate. Sulfate was utilized as a terminal electron acceptor and was paired with electron donors. Sodium lactate was a terminal electron donor and was paired with electron acceptors.

== Characterization ==
Desulfovibrio arcticus was found to be a cold-adapting sulfate-reducing bacterium, withstanding the freezing and highly saline conditions of cryopegs (within permafrost) in the Barents Sea. Its discovery and analysis very positively aligned with the characterization of the known Desulfovibrio genus of bacteria. The specific strain that was examined was B15^{T} and was further analyzed using phase-contrast and electron microscopy of its 16S sequence.

The technology used revealed its motility, each containing a single polar flagellum, and Gram-negative results. After testing for desulfoviridin, the B15^{T} strain showed absorption bands for it, along with for cytochrome c. Its length varies from 3.0-4.0 μm, and its width from 0.4-0.5 μm. The temperature for growth ranges from –2 to 28 (°C) with the optimum temperature being 24 (°C). It also grows at pH 6.0-8.0 with the optimum pH being 6.7-7.0. Its DNA G+C content is 55.2 (mol%). Its incubation period is 8–14 days. The pH for growth ranges from 6.7-8.0 with the optimum pH being from 6.7-7.0. The B15^{T} strain also grew with 0-2.0% NaCl, with the optimum NaCl for growth being 0.2%.

Following DNA isolation, DNA-DNA hybridization, amplification and sequencing, D. arcticus was found to have the fatty acid iso-C_{17}, characteristic of the family Desulfovibrionaceae. It is characterized as a sulfate-reducing bacteria, the first of its kind to be isolated from Arctic permafrost, specifically within cryopegs. With sulfate, it utilizes H_{2}, acetate, pyruvate, lactate, choline, formate, and ethanol as electron donors and carbon sources. Its terminal electron acceptors are sulfate, sulfite, thiosulfate, elemental sulfur, DMSO, and Fe^{3+} when lactate is present. The species is culturable as a pure isolate.

== Importance ==
This organism is important as it contributes to the current understanding of microbial life in subzero temperatures, particularly those found in the Arctic environment. This species is recognized as the first successful isolation of the Desulfovibrio genus to be identified from high sulfate concentrations in arctic cryopegs (within permafrost). D. arcticus can be seen as a component within the sulfur cycle in frozen climates, opening the opportunity for researchers to understand how these organisms adapt, survive, and function in extreme freezing conditions, including within permafrost.

As D. arcticus is a sulfate-reducing bacteria, it plays a role in various ecosystems as they promote the sulfur cycle, specifically in the dissimilatory sulfate reduction process. Moreover, as D. arcticus is accustomed to cold environments, it can enable nutrient recycling through breaking down complex organic material in anaerobic conditions
