= Desulfovibrio alcoholivorans =

Scientific classification
- Domain: Bacteria
- Kingdom: Pseudomonadati
- Phylum: Thermodesulfobacteriota
- Class: Desulfovibrionia
- Order: Desulfovibrionales
- Family: Desulfovibrionaceae
- Genus: Desulfovibrio
- Species: D. alcoholivorans

Binomial name
- Desulfovibrio alcoholivorans Qatibi et al. 1995

Type strain
- ATCC 49738, DSM 5433, SPSN, VKM B-1761

Synonyms
- Desulfovibrio alcoholovorans

Species of bacterium

Desulfovibrio alcoholivorans is a bacterium from the genus Desulfovibrio which has been isolated from alcohol industry waste water in France.

== Discovery ==
Desulfovibrio alcoholivorans was discovered in 1990, France, from an anaerobic fermenter within the alcohol industry, isolated as Desulfovibrio strain SPSN and proposed with the name Desulfovibrio alcoholovorans.

=== Isolation and Genera ===
The bacteria was isolated through the agar shake method, which allows determination of whether the species is anaerobic or aerobic using minimum inhibitory concentrations. In this case, anaerobic tubes were used as it was inferred that the bacteria was of the Desulfovibrio genus. Upon discovery, the Hungate technique was employed, which is performed anaerobically to obtain pure cultures through a series of cannulae. After isolated samples were placed into the tubes, they were flooded with nitrogen (N_{2}) and carbon dioxide (C0_{2}) gas. Sterile conditions were maintained by sealing the tubes which were continually monitored. Pure samples were inoculated on agar plates composed of 1% glucose, 1% yeast extract, and 1% Biotrypcas. Following inoculation, the sample underwent cell fractionation and a spectroscopy examination. Whole-cell DNA was extracted and the mole ratio of guanine and cytosine was determined using high-performance liquid chromatography. Transmission electron microscopy and phase contrast microscopy were used to study cultures of cells in the proliferation phase. Finally, HPLC analyses were then performed on glycerol, diols, and non-volatile fatty acids. It was found that D. alcoholivorans exhibited optimal growth when kept at around 37 °C with a pH between 5.5 and 8.5.

=== Classification ===
Desulfovibrio alcoholivorans was found to be a Gram-negative, curved, non-spore forming, and motile organism with the metabolic ability to reduce sulfate. These factors supported the characterization of the bacterium under the Desulfovibrio genus. A defining factor that set D. alcoholivorans apart from existing strains was its ability to oxidize 1,3-propanediol into acetate.

== Taxonomy and Phylogeny ==
Desulfovibrio alcoholivorans belongs to the domain of bacteria. Desulfovibrio exists in the phylum of Deltaproteobacteria, mainly composed of aerobic bacteria but includes a branch of strict anaerobes with the ability to reduce sulfur and sulfate. D. alcoholivorans belong to the family Desulfovibrionaceae, bacteria that have been found in mud volcanoes and exhibit sulfur-reduction. Desulfovibrionaceae exists within the order of Desulfovibrionales and includes a myriad of genera including Desulfovibrio, Desulfobaculum, Desulfocurvus, Bilophila, and Lawsonia.

=== Neighboring species ===
Within the genus Desulfovibrio, phylogenetic relationships between known species have been extracted using 16S rRNA sequencing. Desulfovibrio alcoholivorans is most closely related to Desulfovibrio burkinesis and Desulfovibrio fructosivorans. D. burkinesis are motile Gram-negative bacteria that do not form spores with curved rods, which exhibit similar growth conditions as D. alcoholivorans. D. burkinesis shares 95% similarity to D. alcoholivorans while the mean similarity of both strains to other Desulfovibrio species is 88%. Similarities were also drawn between D. alcoholivorans and Desulfovibrio carbinolicus and Desulfovibrio giganteus, the latter of which was also first discovered in France.

The metabolic substrate preferences for the various Desulfovibrio species are one of the key distinguishing factors. For instance, D. alcoholivorans can oxidize glycerol and 1,2 and 1,3-propanediol to acetate. Meanwhile, D. carbinolicus cannot use 1,2-propanediol, and forms 3-hydroxypropionate from the breakdown of glycerol and 1,3-propanediol.

Two structures that have been found in all currently documented Desulfovibrio species are the enzyme desulfoviridin and the pigment cytochrome c3. Desulfoviridin is a catabolic sulfite reductase enzyme involved in reducing sulfite to sulfate, a process that can contribute to anabolic synthesis of biomolecules that incorporate sulfur. Structurally, it has been observed through desulfoviridin in D. vulgaris that the enzyme is multimeric and contains iron in the form of Fe_{4}S_{4} and siroheme. Cytochrome c3 isolated from D. gigas is dimeric with four heme groups each, though its function still remains unclear. When identified in D. alcoholivorans, cytochrome c3 displayed maximum absorptions at 418, 523, and 552 nm.

== Genomics ==
The primary genomic marker used to characterize Desulfovibrio relative to neighboring strains was 16S rRNA cultivated in media enriched with lactate and sulfate for optimal growth conditions. The motility of Desulfovibrio has been genomically predicted with 86.831% confidence. The Gram-negative and non-sporulating characteristics have been predicted with 99.982% and 93% confidence, respectively. A confidence interval indicates how many times the true estimate will be observed within a set range of values after repeated studies of the sample. Thus, the predicted characteristics of D. alcoholivorans would match with the frequency of the corresponding percentage if multiple predictions were carried out. The molar percent of guanine and cytosine in the content of the bacteria's genetic material is 64.5 ± 0.3%. The genome size of D. alcoholivorans is 5.1 Mb and 65 contigs. A partial sequence of 1,654 base pairs is known of the 16S ribosomal RNA gene.

Another approach to characterizing Desulfovibrio and other sulfate-reducing genera and species is using genes that encode for sulfate-reducing enzymes used in their metabolic pathways. These enzymes include dsrAB (dissimilatory sulfite reductase) and aprBA (dissimilatory adenosine-5'-phosphosulfate reductase). Using both 16S rRNA and dsrAB sequenced genes in an isolate of 47 sulfate-reducing microbial species, D. alcoholivorans was identified as the dominant sulfate-reducer in the rhizosphere of Lake Velencei in Hungary.

Desulfovibrio has also been analyzed as compared to the genome of D. gigas, often used in the laboratory setting as a comparative sulfate-reducing organism. The comparative analyses included those of sulfate respiratory metabolic enzymes and CRISPR/Cas elements. An evolutionary relationship was then built between Desulfovibrio species based on RpoB and GyrB sequences, which may set a further precedent in the insight into D. alcoholivorans and its own genomic content based on its phylogenetic relationship to other Desulfovibrio species.

== Morphology ==
Desulfovibrio alcoholivorans is classified as a motile, vibrioid rod bacterium with a single polar flagella that becomes spirilloid in aging cultures. The strain has also been further characterized as Gram-negative and non-sporulating. The cells were observed either singly or in pair clusters with a diameter of 0.7-0.9 m and length of 2.8-3.2 m. In addition, the morphology of Desulfovibrio has been established as similar to phylogenetically related strains such as Desulfovibrio carbinolicus, Desulfovibrio burkinensis, and Desulfovibrio fructosivorans using 16S rRNA information.

== Metabolism & Physiology ==
Metabolically, Desulfovibrio alcoholivorans is an anaerobic incomplete oxidizer of substrates that concomitantly reduces sulfur, sulfate, sulfite, and thiosulfate. Substrates that can be electron donors include hydrogen, formate, lactate, pyruvate, fumarate, malate, succinate, DHA, glycerol, diols, and alcohols. The metabolism of these substrates produce non-uniform byproducts. If sulfate is available, catabolic oxidation of glycerol, 1,3-propanediol, ethanol, pyruvate, fumarate, succinate, malate, and lactate produces acetate and CO_{2}. Degradation of the alcohols propanol, butanol, and pentanol results in propionate, butyrate, and valerate, respectively. The organism's anaerobic characteristic is genomically predicted with 97.646% confidence. The optimum growth temperature is around 35-37 °C at a pH of 7. Additionally, D. alcoholivorans can metabolize propanediols in the absence of sulfate, notably through an ecological association with other methanogenic bacteria.

== Ecology ==
Desulfovibrio alcoholivorans has primarily been isolated from alcohol production plants where glycerol is the predominant byproduct in waste water runoff along with 1,3-propanediol accumulation, both of which D. alcoholivorans can oxidize via sulfate reduction. The related Desulfovibrio species D. burkinensis was isolated from an anoxic rice field, a type of environment where the contribution of sulfate-reducing bacteria in mitigating sulfide accumulation is of particular interest.

In addition to strict anaerobic fermentation, the ecological phenomenon of syntrophic association has been explored between D. alcoholivorans and the methanogenic Methanospirillum hungatei, from which it was concluded that the speed and extent of metabolite degradation is ultimately dependent on whether sulfate was present. Hydrogen, CO_{2}, and acetate are the most common substrates for methanogens. In this syntrophic association, the terminal electron acceptors are the protons of hydrogen, which may be implicated in different enzymatic activity compared to monocultures of D. alcoholivorans that can use sulfate. Metabolism of glycerol, 1,2-propanediol, and 1,3-propanediol shows some differences between D. alcoholivorans with available sulfate compared to a co-culture with M. hungatei, both in terms of byproducts in the metabolic pathways and the rates of degradation. For instance, D. alcoholivorans had maximum growth rates of 0.22 hr^{−1} for glycerol, 0.086 hr^{−1} for 1,3-propanediol, and 0.09 hr^{−1} for 1,2-propanediol using sulfate as the oxidizing agent. Meanwhile, in the co-culture, the respective growth rates were 0.047 hr^{−1}, 0.05 hr^{−1}, and 0.005 hr^{−1}. 1,3-propanediol metabolism by D. alcoholivorans with available sulfate resulted in acetate, sulfide, and CO_{2}. But when associated with M. hungatei, the byproducts from 1,3-propanediol were acetate, 3-hydroxypropionate, methane, and CO_{2}, followed by acetate and methane formation from the subsequent breakdown of 3-hydroxypropionate. The degradation of 1,2-propanediol as the substrate in a pure culture of D. alcoholivorans produced acetate and propionate, whereas a co-culture with M. hungatei only resulted in propionate.

Syntrophy and cohabitation with methanogens and acetogens appear to be driven by competition and adaptations to limited resources. When there is excess sulfate present, sulfate-reducing bacteria compete for the same available substrates as methanogens, such as hydrogen and acetate. In doing so, sulfate-reducers will more easily outcompete the others because sulfate has higher potential than hydrogen as an electron acceptor. But when sulfate is unavailable, sulfate-reducing bacteria are observed to rely on hydrogen and acetate as substrates, which may impact methanogenic communities whereby the hydrogen-using sulfate-reducing bacteria take precedent over the usual methanogens.

D. alcoholivorans has also been isolated in Lake Velencei in Hungary, specifically from the rhizosphere of the common reed Phragmites australis. From this isolate, D. alcoholivorans was demonstrated to be the predominant sulfate-reducer out of 47 strains that were characterized using 16S rRNA and dsrAB information. Sulfate-reducers are more prominent in rhizosphere zones compared to soil areas without plants. Rhizosphere soil harbors rich interactions between plant roots and surrounding microbes, which, combined with the presence of anaerobic zones, establish a suitable environment for the sulfate-reducing bacteria to thrive on organic substrate availability. Moreover, in a recycling, mutualistic manner, aerobic sulfide-oxidizing microbes that are also in the rhizosphere fuel optimal anaerobic conditions through oxygen depletion. There has been further mention that unavoidable oxygen exposure from the roots may even exert a selective pressure for the sulfate-reducing bacteria to overcome oxygenic toxicity. In addition to mutualistic distribution of resources, the sulfate-reducing species are observed to compete for substrates, particularly lactate, ethanol, and sulfate. Ultimately, the Desulfovibrio members were found to be the strongest competitors, primarily based on their incomplete oxidative abilities wherein the byproducts are able to be used after completing fermentation.

== Applications ==
Ecologically, Desulfovibrio alcoholivorans plays a role in exerting both advantages and toxicities that may arise if its presence is not known or monitored. As an organism that sequesters sulfate via its reduction, this species can contribute to alkalinity and neutralizing acidic waste, particularly mine waste. In general, sulfate reduction plays a part in degrading organic matter in anaerobic environments, such as aquatic niches and the aforementioned rhizospheres where mutualistic associations can stimulate growth of both the plants and microbes in the vicinity. Desulfovibrio may also contribute to biofilms in wastewater treatment, where the concentration of microbes can potentially propagate sulfur redox cycles in association with one another. Other applications of sulfate reduction include removal of heavy metals and recycling of sulfur-containing compounds in wastewater.

Because of sulfide production, a consequence of sulfate-reducing bacteria, like D. alcoholivorans, is microbial corrosion in anaerobic environments, such as oil production or clogged soils. Corrosion of iron also mainly occurs from hydrogen sulfide, which is a byproduct of sulfate reduction, on a microbial level. Sulfate-reducing bacteria have been known to directly corrode iron via metabolic coupling. The metals commonly used in oil and gas pipes are also prone to corrosion. Pipelines that run underground have a higher risk of bacterial corrosion as sulfate-reducing bacteria is commonly found in soil. Additionally, oxygen-poor environments promote bacterial corrosion, considering that most sulfate-reducing bacteria, like D. alcoholivorans, are strict anaerobes. Awareness of the impacts of sulfate-reducers contributes to the design of sustainable infrastructure and construction of pipelines that may otherwise pose corrosion and contamination risk.

Not only have Desulfovibrio been found in the environment, they also exist in the human GI tract and have been tied to multiple diseases including cancer, IBS, Parkinson's disease, and autism. Some studies have linked bacteria in the gut to the pathogenesis of Parkinson's disease; in 2022, several publications on the pathogenesis of the disease and the gut microbiome were examined. Several bacteria were detected in the gut microbiome of Parkinson's patients but not healthy individuals, including Desulfovibrio. Desulfovibrio in the gut has been linked to dozens of diseases, including inflammatory bowel disease, in which Desulfovibrio overgrowth has notably been linked to increases in the occurrence of Crohn's disease and ulcerative colitis.
