= Desulfovibrio magneticus =

Scientific classification
- Domain: Bacteria
- Kingdom: Pseudomonadati
- Phylum: Thermodesulfobacteriota
- Class: Desulfovibrionia
- Order: Desulfovibrionales
- Family: Desulfovibrionaceae
- Genus: Desulfovibrio
- Species: D. magneticus

Binomial name
- Desulfovibrio magneticus Sakaguchi et al. 2002; Shimoshige et al. 2021

Synonyms
- Solidesulfovibrio magneticus

Species of bacterium

Desulfovibrio magneticus is an anaerobic, Gram-negative, sulfate-reducing bacteria originally sourced from freshwater sediments in Wakayama, Japan but have also been found in the deep sea, indicating their ability to thrive in aquatic environments. D. magneticus are classified as magnetotactic bacteria with the ability to produce magnetite particles. Since its discovery, further research has revealed the importance of D. magneticus and the magnetosomes they produce in the development of medical devices, reduction of nutrient-rich dead zones, and fossilization methods.

== Taxonomy ==
Desulfovibrio magneticus is a magnetotactic bacteria. Unlike most other magnetotactic bacteria, D. magneticus is not a member of the α-Proteobacteria phylum. Instead, this bacteria belongs to the Proteobacteria phylum, the Deltaproteobacteria class, and the Desulfovibrio genus. With further testing and analysis, D. magneticus was also taxonomically classified as a member of the Desulfovibrionaceae family and the Desulfovibrionales order.

== Phylogenetics ==
Upon comparison of 1540 bases of 16S rDNA for the RS-1^{T} strain, the strain identified as D. magneticus, it was found that the organism is most phylogenetically related to Desulfovibrio burkinesis, with a similarity of approximately 98%. Although increasingly similar, the two species were further tested against each other using DNA-DNA hybridization to confirm they were not identical organisms. With this analysis, they were found to be related by only 51%, indicating that they are not identical and carry significant differences in their nitrogenous base compositions. The next two phylogenetically close species to D. magneticus are Desulfovibrio alcoholivorans and Desulfovibrio fructosivorans, which have 95% and 94% similarities to the RS-1^{T} strain, respectively. Further investigation of the similarity between D. magneticus and other existing magnetotactic bacteria, including those belonging to species of the Magnetospirillum genus, revealed large differences in the metabolism and morphology of the sulfate-reducing bacterium, indicating that magnetotactic bacteria did not all originate and evolve from the same source.

== Discovery ==
Desulfovibrio magneticus was discovered by Toshifumi Sakaguchi, Atsushi Arakaki, and Tadashi Matsunaga from Tokyo University of Agriculture and Technology in January 2002. The sample was found in the Kameno River waterway in the freshwater sediment in Wakayama, Japan, and they separated a specific strain called RS-1^{T} in the organism via non-magnetic enrichment after they were incubated anaerobically. The non-magnetic enrichment method that was utilized to isolate the RS-1^{T} strain consisted of incubating and enriching the growth of the magnetic organism in a specific medium, and separating the colonies after the magnetic bacteria growth was further amplified. Once isolation procedures were complete, DNA was extracted from the organism to remove the 16s rDNA fragment. Copies of 16s rDNA fragments, a section of DNA that is often used to identify rare species, were then amplified via Polymerase Chain Reaction, and analyzed further. GenBank, DDBJ databases, and FASTA software were used to find other sequences similar to the RS-1^{T} 16s rDNA sequences. Identified 16s rDNA sequences similar to the RS-1^{T} strain were compared to further analyze the genetic profile of the organism. Finally, a tree topology was created using the Neighbor Joining algorithm method.

== Morphology ==
Desulfovibrio magneticus is a vibrio-shaped, Gram-negative cell with no spores and moves with a single polar flagellum. It is 3 to 5 micrometers in length and 1 micrometer in width, and it is a motile organism.

== Ecology ==
Desulfovibrio magneticus were originally found in freshwater sediments in Japan. It is seen that the general magnetotactic bacterias typically thrive in sediments or water columns that have been chemically stratified. However, magnetotactic bacterias have also been recorded to survive in various aquatic habitats including intertidal sediments and the deep sea.

== Genomics ==
After analyzing the whole genome sequence of D. magneticus RS-1 strain, it was found the genome is a circular chromosome that is 5,248,049 base pairs long, which is around 1.5 million base pairs larger than other Desulfovibrio strains. The genome also consists of two circular plasmids called pDMC1 and pDMC2. Within the circular chromosome, there are 4629 open reading frames (ORF), while pDMC1 contains 65 and pDMC2 contains 10 ORFs. There were several long genomic segments found in this strain, with the longest segment being 115 kilobases long. It was also observed that the average guanine and cytosine content in each of the genomic segments was lower than the total guanine and cytosine content seen in the entire chromosome. Within the chromosome sequence, 55 insertion sequence elements were found mainly in the genomic segments with low guanine and cytosine content and in pDMC1. These genomic characteristics of D. magneticus have suggested the idea that a majority of their DNA has been acquired from distantly related organisms through horizontal gene transfers.

== Metabolism ==
D. magneticus is an anaerobic microbe nutritionally powered by using organic carbon as both the energy and carbon source for growth of its population. They also utilize chemical reactions by accepting and donating electrons to obtain energy. More specifically, the bacterium is a chemoorganotroph that can use organic carbon sources such as lactate, pyruvate, and glycerol as carbon sources and as electron donors as well. Additional electron acceptors for the bacterium's growth include sulfate, thiosulfate, and fumarate. Different combinations of specific electron donors and acceptors corresponding to D. magneticus can produce a varying amount of magnetite particles. According to the Sakaguchi, Arakaki, and Matsunaga, six magnetite particles were produced when a combination of pyruvate and fumarate were used.

== Importance ==
=== Use in healthcare settings ===
Desulfovibrio magneticus is a magnetotactic bacteria, which produces an important form of crystallized organelle called magnetosomes. A magnetosome is a well organized chain organelle that is surrounded by a lipid bilayer membrane that consists of a nano-sized crystallization of a magnetic iron mineral. Since magnetosomes have magnetic properties that can be useful for certain biomedical practices, magnetosomes have been utilized in certain processes such as Magnetic resonance imaging (MRI), drug delivery, separating of molecules, immobilization, gene therapeutics, and hyperthermia therapeutics. Additionally, many types of magnetosomes have been observed to have similar morphologies with smaller size variations, good dispersion properties, and more compatible with biomaterials in medical devices, which led researchers to apply this crystallized organelle in more medical practices.

=== Potential in reducing eutrophication in aquatic systems ===
Magnetotactic bacteria, which is one of the classifications of Desulfovibrio magneticus, have been observed to be involved in cycling of iron, sulfur, phosphorus, carbon, and nitrogen on Earth. They have also been discovered to be capable of isolating heavy metal elements such as selenium, cadmium, and tellurium. With their ability to cycle and isolate both essential and heavy metal trace elements, scientists have found magnetotactic bacteria to have the potential to decontaminate aquatic pollution. Since magnetotactic bacteria are also involved in the earth's cycling of certain essential elements, it is also seen as a potential microorganism that can reduce eutrophication in aquatic environments. Eutrophication is the process where a large build-up of nutrients in an aquatic environment causes an overgrowth of algae that kills aquatic plants by blocking the sunlight. Additionally, the decomposition of the algae growth kills the animals in the environment by depleting their oxygen source which causes further harm to the aquatic system. The process of eutrophication and the creation of dead zones lead to global warming, so the utilization of magnetotactic bacteria as a potential tool to reduce eutrophication can help slow down climate change.

=== Use as magnetofossils ===
As a magnetotactic bacteria, Desulfovibrio magneticus can be used to record paleoenvironmental change and track geomagnetic field history after their death by creating fossil magnetosome magnetic nanoparticles, also known as magnetofossils. This occurs because magnetofossils can be preserved in rocks and sediments, and can be used to trace evolutionary magnetotactic bacteria for up to 1.9 Ga, or one billion years ago. However, the use of microbial fossils to study geological history has been seen as controversial in the field, as there have been several cases where the interpretations and purity of the fossils have been questioned. For example, there was a controversial paper published about the discovery of Apex chert fossils which were stated to be the oldest evidence of life, but was uncovered to be a form of graphite mineral that have been formed through non-biological processes. Although the use of microbiotic fossils for the study of geological history has been controversial, the use of magnetofossils are still regarded as a promising tool to record and trace geomagnetic field history.
