= Maridesulfovibrio ferrireducens =

Scientific classification
- Domain: Bacteria
- Kingdom: Pseudomonadati
- Phylum: Thermodesulfobacteriota
- Class: Desulfovibrionia
- Order: Desulfovibrionales
- Family: Desulfovibrionaceae
- Genus: Maridesulfovibrio
- Species: M. ferrireducens

Binomial name
- Maridesulfovibrio ferrireducens (Vandieken et al. 2006) Waite et al. 2020

Type strain
- DSM 16995, JCM 12925, 61

Species of bacterium

Maridesulfovibrio ferrireducens is a psychrotolerant bacterium which has been isolated from permanently cold sediments from fjords in the Svalbard archipelago in Norway. Originally described under Desulfovibrio, it was reassigned to Maridesulfovibrio by Waite et al. in 2020.
