= Desulfovibrio marrakechensis =

Scientific classification
- Domain: Bacteria
- Kingdom: Pseudomonadati
- Phylum: Thermodesulfobacteriota
- Class: Desulfovibrionia
- Order: Desulfovibrionales
- Family: Desulfovibrionaceae
- Genus: Desulfovibrio
- Species: D. marrakechensis

Binomial name
- Desulfovibrio marrakechensis Chamkh et al. 2009

Species of bacterium

Desulfovibrio marrakechensis is a bacterium. It is sulfate-reducing and tyrosol-oxidising. Its cells are mesophilic, non-spore-forming, non-motile, Gram-negative, catalase-positive and straight-rod-shaped. They contain cytochrome c(3) and desulfoviridin. The type strain is EMSSDQ(4)(T) (=DSM 19337(T) =ATCC BAA-1562(T)).
