= Desulfovibrio brasiliensis =

Scientific classification
- Domain: Bacteria
- Kingdom: Pseudomonadati
- Phylum: Thermodesulfobacteriota
- Class: Desulfovibrionia
- Order: Desulfovibrionales
- Family: Desulfovibrionaceae
- Genus: Desulfovibrio
- Species: D. brasiliensis

Binomial name
- Desulfovibrio brasiliensis Krekeler et al. 1997

Species of bacterium

Desulfovibrio brasiliensis is a moderately halophilic bacteria first isolated from Brazil, hence its name. It is sulfate-reducing, 0.3–0.45micrometres wide and 1.0–3.5 micrometres long, Gram-negative and motile (one subpolar flagellum present).
