= Fundidesulfovibrio butyratiphilus =

Scientific classification
- Domain: Bacteria
- Kingdom: Pseudomonadati
- Phylum: Thermodesulfobacteriota
- Class: Desulfovibrionia
- Order: Desulfovibrionales
- Family: Desulfovibrionaceae
- Genus: Fundidesulfovibrio
- Species: F. butyratiphilus

Binomial name
- Fundidesulfovibrio butyratiphilus (Suzuki et al. 2010) Galushko and Kuever 2021

Species of bacterium

Fundidesulfovibrio butyratiphilus is a bacterium. It is Gram-negative, butyrate-oxidizing and sulfate-reducing. It is also strictly anaerobic, mesophilic, motile by means of a single polar flagellum, non-spore-forming and rod-shaped. Its type strain is BSYT (=5JCM 15519T =5DSM 21556T).

Originally described under Desulfovibrio, it was reassigned to Fundidesulfovibrio by Galushko and Kuever in 2021.
