= Desulfovibrio dechloracetivorans =

Scientific classification
- Domain: Bacteria
- Kingdom: Pseudomonadati
- Phylum: Thermodesulfobacteriota
- Class: Desulfovibrionia
- Order: Desulfovibrionales
- Family: Desulfovibrionaceae
- Genus: Desulfovibrio
- Species: D. dechloracetivorans

Binomial name
- Desulfovibrio dechloracetivorans Sun et al. 2001

Species of bacterium

Desulfovibrio dechloracetivorans is a bacterium. It is a Gram-negative, anaerobic, motile, short curved rod that grows by coupling the reductive dechlorination of 2-chlorophenol to the oxidation of acetate.
