= Pseudodesulfovibrio aespoeensis =

Scientific classification
- Domain: Bacteria
- Kingdom: Pseudomonadati
- Phylum: Thermodesulfobacteriota
- Class: Desulfovibrionia
- Order: Desulfovibrionales
- Family: Desulfovibrionaceae
- Genus: Pseudodesulfovibrio
- Species: P. aespoeensis

Binomial name
- Pseudodesulfovibrio aespoeensis (Motamedi and Pedersen 1998) Cao et al. 2016

Type strain
- Aspo-2, ATCC 700646, DSM 10631

Synonyms
- Desulfovibrio aespoeensis Motamedi and Pedersen 1998

Species of bacterium

Pseudodesulfovibrio aespoeensis is a mesophilic and sulfate-reducing bacterium which has been isolated from groundwater from the Äspö Hard Rock Laboratory in Sweden. Originally described under Desulfovibrio, it was reassigned to Pseudodesulfovibrio by Cao et al. in 2016.
