= Fundidesulfovibrio putealis =

Scientific classification
- Domain: Bacteria
- Kingdom: Pseudomonadati
- Phylum: Thermodesulfobacteriota
- Class: Desulfovibrionia
- Order: Desulfovibrionales
- Family: Desulfovibrionaceae
- Genus: Fundidesulfovibrio
- Species: F. putealis

Binomial name
- Fundidesulfovibrio putealis (Basso et al. 2005) Waite et al. 2020

Species of bacterium

Fundidesulfovibrio putealis is a bacterium. It is sulfate-reducing. Its cells are motile by means of a polar flagellum and contain desulfoviridin. The type strain is B7-43^{T} (=DSM 16056^{T} =ATCC BAA-905^{T}).

Originally described under Desulfovibrio, it was reassigned to Fundidesulfovibrio by Waite et al. in 2020.
