= Halodesulfovibrio marinisediminis =

Scientific classification
- Domain: Bacteria
- Kingdom: Pseudomonadati
- Phylum: Thermodesulfobacteriota
- Class: Desulfovibrionia
- Order: Desulfovibrionales
- Family: Desulfovibrionaceae
- Genus: Halodesulfovibrio
- Species: H. marinisediminis

Binomial name
- Halodesulfovibrio marinisediminis (Takii et al. 2008) Shivani et al. 2017

Species of bacterium

Halodesulfovibrio marinisediminis is a sulfate-reducing bacterium. Its cells are vibrio-shaped, Gram-negative, motile rods (0.7-1.0 micrometres wide and 1.0-3.5 micrometres long) with single polar flagella. The type strain is C/L2(T) (=NBRC [corrected] 101113(T) =JCM 14577(T) =DSM 17456(T)).

Originally described under Desulfovibrio, it was reassigned to Halodesulfovibrio by Cao et al. in 2016.
