= Desulfovibrio piezophilus =

Scientific classification
- Domain: Bacteria
- Kingdom: Pseudomonadati
- Phylum: Thermodesulfobacteriota
- Class: Desulfovibrionia
- Order: Desulfovibrionales
- Family: Desulfovibrionaceae
- Genus: Desulfovibrio
- Species: D. piezophilus

Binomial name
- Desulfovibrio piezophilus Khelaifia et al. 2011

Species of bacterium

Desulfovibrio piezophilus is a bacterium. It is sulfate-reducing and piezophilic, hence its name. The type strain is C1TLV30(T) ( = DSM 21447(T) = JCM 1548(T)).
