= Solidesulfovibrio aerotolerans =

Scientific classification
- Domain: Bacteria
- Kingdom: Pseudomonadati
- Phylum: Thermodesulfobacteriota
- Class: Desulfovibrionia
- Order: Desulfovibrionales
- Family: Desulfovibrionaceae
- Genus: Solidesulfovibrio
- Species: S. aerotolerans

Binomial name
- Solidesulfovibrio aerotolerans (Mogensen et al. 2009) Waite et al. 2020

Type strain
- DSM 16695, DvO5, JCM 12613

Synonyms
- Desulfovibrio aerotolerans Mogensen et al. 2009; Desulfovibrio oxyvorans

Species of bacterium

Solidesulfovibrio aerotolerans is a Gram-negative, mesophilic, sulphate-reducing and oxygen tolerant bacterium from the genus of Solidesulfovibrio which has been isolated from activated sludge in Denmark. Originally described under Desulfovibrio, it was reassigned to Solidesulfovibrio by Waite et al. in 2020.
