= Desulfovibrio halophilus =

Scientific classification
- Domain: Bacteria
- Kingdom: Pseudomonadati
- Phylum: Thermodesulfobacteriota
- Class: Desulfovibrionia
- Order: Desulfovibrionales
- Family: Desulfovibrionaceae
- Genus: Desulfovibrio
- Species: D. halophilus

Binomial name
- Desulfovibrio halophilus Caumette et al. 1991

Species of bacterium

Desulfovibrio halophilus is a halophilic sulfate-reducing bacterium.
