= Desulfovibrio alkalitolerans =

Scientific classification
- Domain: Bacteria
- Kingdom: Pseudomonadati
- Phylum: Thermodesulfobacteriota
- Class: Desulfovibrionia
- Order: Desulfovibrionales
- Family: Desulfovibrionaceae
- Genus: Desulfovibrio
- Species: D. alkalitolerans

Binomial name
- Desulfovibrio alkalitolerans Abildgaard et al. 2006

Species of bacterium

Desulfovibrio alkalitolerans is an alkalitolerant and sulfate-reducing bacterium of the genus Desulfovibrio that was isolated from a biofilm in a district heating plant in Skanderborg, Denmark

== Genus ==
This organism belongs to the genus Desulfovibrio. The genus is mesophilic, Gram-negative, anaerobic, rod-shaped bacteria. They use the dissimilatory sulfate reduction pathway to oxidize hydrogen or organic compounds and reduce oxidized sulfur compounds for energy conservation. This genus produce hydrogen sulfide gas as a byproduct. They are found in a variety of environments like marine sediments, oil fields, anaerobic waste-water treatment plants, and mud volcanoes. This genus is also a small part of the gastrointestinal microbiome where they can sometimes cause issues. There are some indications that Desulfovibrio may potentially play a role in inflammatory bowel disease pathology.

== Isolation ==
Strain RT2T was isolated from a biofilm occurring with pipe corrosion in the alkaline water of a Danish district heating system. It was identified from the culture after extract DNA and sequenced of the 16S rRNA gene. The analysis of the resulting sequence assigned the strain RT2T to the genus Desulfovibrio.
