= Desulfovibrio bastinii =

Scientific classification
- Domain: Bacteria
- Kingdom: Pseudomonadati
- Phylum: Thermodesulfobacteriota
- Class: Desulfovibrionia
- Order: Desulfovibrionales
- Family: Desulfovibrionaceae
- Genus: Desulfovibrio
- Species: D. bastinii

Binomial name
- Desulfovibrio bastinii Magot et al. 2004

Species of bacterium

Desulfovibrio bastinii is a moderately halophilic bacteria. It is sulfate-reducing, mesophilic and motile. Its type strain is SRL4225^{T} (=DSM 16055^{T} =ATCC BAA-903^{T}).
