= Desulfohalobium =

Scientific classification
- Domain: Bacteria
- Kingdom: Pseudomonadati
- Phylum: Thermodesulfobacteriota
- Class: Desulfovibrionia
- Order: Desulfovibrionales
- Family: Desulfohalobiaceae
- Genus: Desulfohalobium; Ollivier et al. 1991

Type species
- Desulfohalobium retbaense Ollivier et al. 1991

Species
- D. retbaense

Synonyms
- Desulfatihalobium

Genus of bacteria

Desulfohalobium is a Gram negative, anaerobic, sulfate-reducing, moderately halophilic and rod-shaped bacterial genus from the family of Desulfovibrionaceae.

== See also ==
- List of bacterial orders
- List of bacteria genera
