= Humidesulfovibrio =

Scientific classification
- Domain: Bacteria
- Kingdom: Pseudomonadati
- Phylum: Thermodesulfobacteriota
- Class: Desulfovibrionia
- Order: Desulfovibrionales
- Family: Desulfovibrionaceae
- Genus: Humidesulfovibrio; Waite et al. 2020

Type species
- Humidesulfovibrio mexicanus (Hernandez-Eugenio et al. 2001) Waite et al. 2020

Species
- H. arcticus; H. idahonensis; H. mexicanus

Genus of bacterium

Humidesulfovibrio is a bacterium genus in the family Desulfovibrionaceae.

== Phylogeny ==
The currently accepted taxonomy is based on the List of Prokaryotic names with Standing in Nomenclature (LPSN) and National Center for Biotechnology Information (NCBI).

16S rRNA based LTP_10_2024

- Humidesulfovibrio
  - H. mexicanus (Hernandez-Eugenio et al. 2001) Waite et al. 2020
  - - H. arcticus (Pecheritsyna et al. 2012) Waite et al. 2020
    - H. idahonensis (Sass et al. 2009) Waite et al. 2020

120 marker proteins based GTDB 09-RS220

- Humidesulfovibrio
  H. mexicanus

== See also ==
- List of bacterial orders
- List of bacteria genera
