= Desulfovibrio aminophilus =

Scientific classification
- Domain: Bacteria
- Kingdom: Pseudomonadati
- Phylum: Proteobacteria
- Class: Desulfovibrionia
- Order: Desulfovibrionales
- Family: Desulfovibrionaceae
- Genus: Desulfovibrio
- Species: D. aminophilus

Binomial name
- Desulfovibrio aminophilus Baena et al. 1999

Type strain
- ALA-3, DSM 12254

Species of bacterium

Desulfovibrio aminophilus is a Gram-negative, mesophilic, non-spore-forming, amino acid degrading and sulfate-reducing bacterium from the genus Desulfovibrio which has been isolated from an anaerobic lagoon from a dairy wastewater treatment plant in Santa Fe de Bogota in Colombia.
