= Lawsonia =

Lawsonia may refer to:

- Lawsonia (plant), a genus of plants in the family Lythraceae
- Lawsonia (beetle), a genus of beetles in the family Anthribidae
- Lawsonia (bacterium), a genus of bacteria in the order Desulfovibrionales
- Lawsonia, Maryland, a town in Maryland
