= Desulfonatronovibrio =

Scientific classification
- Domain: Bacteria
- Kingdom: Pseudomonadati
- Phylum: Thermodesulfobacteriota
- Class: Desulfovibrionia
- Order: Desulfovibrionales
- Family: Desulfonatronovibrionaceae
- Genus: Desulfonatronovibrio; Zhilina et al. 1997

Type species
- Desulfonatronovibrio hydrogenovorans Zhilina et al. 1997

Species
- D. halophilus; D. hydrogenovorans; D. magnus; D. thiodismutans

Genus of bacteria

Desulfonatronovibrio is a Gram-negative, vibrios, anaerobic and motile genus of bacteria from the family Desulfohalobiaceae with a single polar flagellum.

== Phylogeny ==
The currently accepted taxonomy is based on the List of Prokaryotic names with Standing in Nomenclature (LPSN) and National Center for Biotechnology Information (NCBI).

16S rRNA based LTP_10_2024

- Desulfonatronovibrio
  - D. halophilus Sorokin et al. 2012
  - - D. thiodismutans Sorokin et al. 2011
    - - D. hydrogenovorans Zhilina et al. 1997
      - D. magnus Sorokin et al. 2011

120 marker proteins based GTDB 10-RS226

- Desulfonatronovibrio
  - D. hydrogenovorans
  - D. magnus
