= Halodesulfovibrio aestuarii =

Scientific classification
- Domain: Bacteria
- Kingdom: Pseudomonadati
- Phylum: Proteobacteria
- Class: Desulfovibrionia
- Order: Desulfovibrionales
- Family: Desulfovibrionaceae
- Genus: Halodesulfovibrio
- Species: H. aestuarii

Binomial name
- Halodesulfovibrio aestuarii (Postgate and Campbell 1966) Shivani et al. 2017

Type strain
- ATCC 29578, DSM 17919, NCIB 9335, NCIMB 9335, Sylt 3

Synonyms
- Desulfovibrio acrylicoreducens; Desulfovibrio acrylicus van der Maarel et al. 1997

Species of bacterium

Halodesulfovibrio aestuarii is a bacterium from the genus Halodesulfovibrio which has been isolated from marine sediments from the Wadden Sea.
