= Desulfovibrio profundus =

Scientific classification
- Domain: Bacteria
- Kingdom: Pseudomonadati
- Phylum: Thermodesulfobacteriota
- Class: Desulfovibrionia
- Order: Desulfovibrionales
- Family: Desulfovibrionaceae
- Genus: Desulfovibrio
- Species: D. profundus

Binomial name
- Desulfovibrio profundus Bale et al. 1997

Species of bacterium

Desulfovibrio profundus is a bacterium. It is sulfate-reducing barophilic bacteria. It is strictly anaerobic, vibrio-shaped and its type strain is 500–1.
