= Desulfovibrio carbinolicus =

Scientific classification
- Domain: Bacteria
- Kingdom: Pseudomonadati
- Phylum: Thermodesulfobacteriota
- Class: Desulfovibrionia
- Order: Desulfovibrionales
- Family: Desulfovibrionaceae
- Genus: Desulfovibrio
- Species: D. carbinolicus

Binomial name
- Desulfovibrio carbinolicus Nanninga & Gottschal, 1987

Species of bacterium

Desulfovibrio carbinolicus is a bacterium. It is sulfate-reducing. Its cells are gram-negative, non-spore-forming, non-motile and curved. Its type strain is EDK82.
