= Bilophila wadsworthia =

Scientific classification
- Domain: Bacteria
- Kingdom: Pseudomonadati
- Phylum: Thermodesulfobacteriota
- Class: Desulfovibrionia
- Order: Desulfovibrionales
- Family: Desulfovibrionaceae
- Genus: Bilophila
- Species: B. wadsworthia

Binomial name
- Bilophila wadsworthia Baron et al., 1990

Species of bacterium

Bilophila wadsworthia is a Gram-negative, obligately anaerobic, catalase-positive, bile-resistant, and asaccharolytic bacillus. Approximately 75% of B. wadsworthia strains are urease positive. B. wadsworthia is linked to various diseases and is not well known due to frequent misidentification of the bacteria; the National Center for Biotechnology Information formerly included it the phylum of Proteobacteria. The two unique characteristics of B. wadsworthia are the utilisation of the alkylsulfonate amino acid taurine in the production of hydrogen sulfide and the rapid catalase reaction. This bacterium is susceptible to the β-lactam antibiotics imipenem, cefoxitin, and ticarcillin.

== Biology ==
=== Type and morphology ===
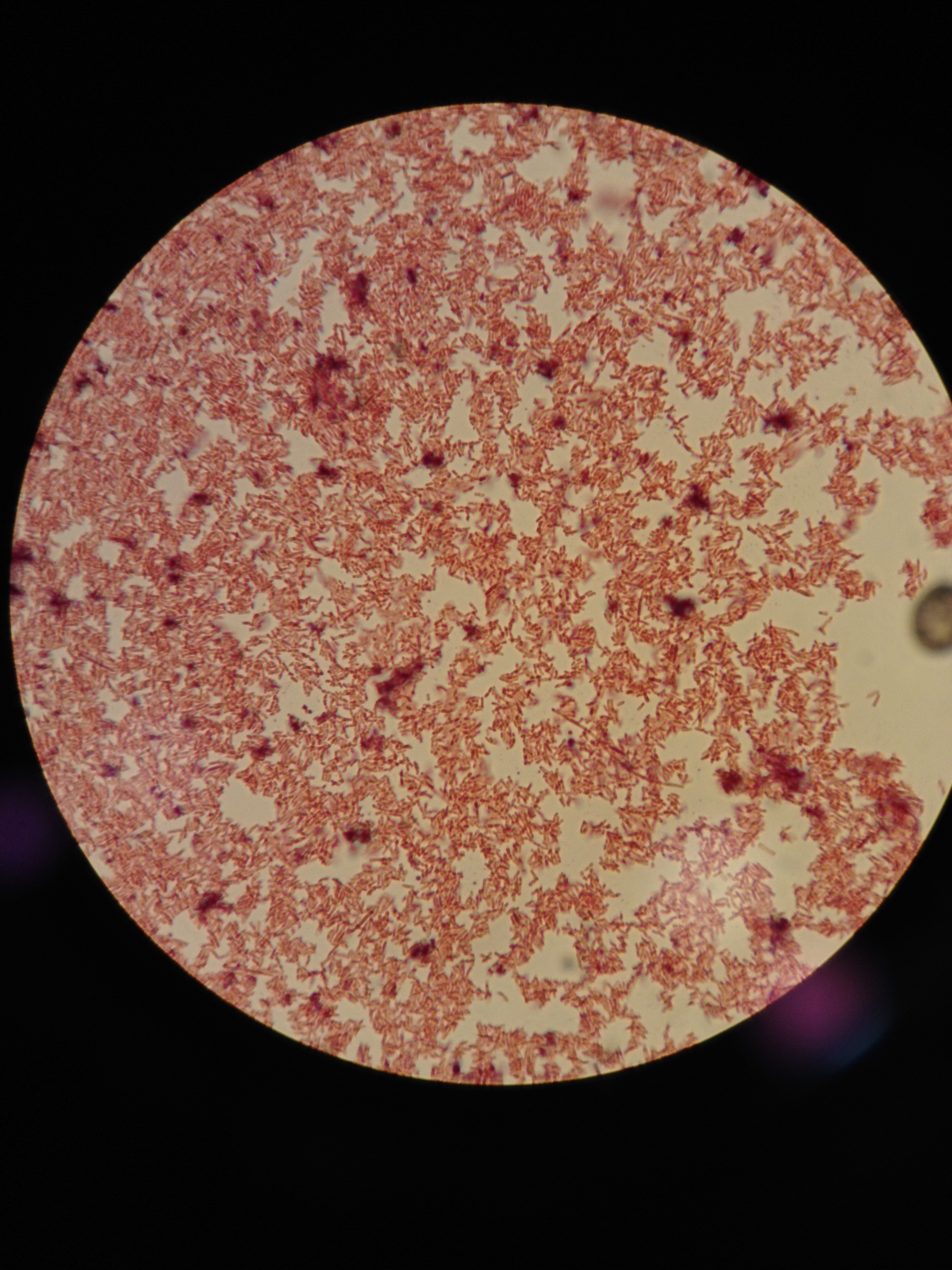
Gram stain showing gram-negative bacteria

B. wadsworthia is a Gram-negative, catalase-positive, and usually urease-positive bacterium. Although most strains are urease positive, there are some strains that are urease negative. This bacterium is approximately 0.7 μm wide by 1.0–10.0 μm long in colony and the cells are pleomorphic with irregular cell walls. B. wadsworthia, due to its slow nature to grow in standard media for anaerobes, is often misidentified as other anaerobes or not identified at all. The best identifier for this bacterium is a transparent colony with a black center in BBE agar; the black center is ferrous sulfide, which is created by the hydrogen sulfide the bacteria produces. Another unique characteristic of B. wadsworthia is its positive catalase reaction with a 15% hydrogen peroxide reagent; its catalase reaction is unlike other catalase-positive species because the reaction is explosive with bubble formation and is very quick. The most accurate method to identify this bacterium from other similar species is through gas liquid chromatography (GLC); GLC results show that there are a lot of acetic acid peaks and minimal succinic acid present. B. wadsworthia is non-motile and is non-spore forming. In addition, this bacterium has irregular cell walls and no flagella attached to it. The two factors that stimulate its growth are bile and pyruvate; specifically, 20% bile and 1% pyruvate.

=== Metabolism ===
One of the main processes that occur in B. wadsworthia is hydrogen sulfide production, which is the product responsible for the bacterium's signature black dot. B. wadsworthia is able to produce hydrogen sulfide through its taurine desulfonation pathway using isethionate sulfite-lyase (IslA). The bacterium converts taurine to hydrogen sulfide when it respires taurine. The production of hydrogen sulfide is connected to the human intestinal microbiota; although there are some benefits to hydrogen sulfide production in the gut like cardioprotection, hydrogen sulfide production also contributes to disease pathology. Production of hydrogen sulfide has been linked to irritable bowel disease (IBD) by damaging the gut epithelium's mucus layer and to colorectal cancer. In addition, during treatments with antibiotics, hydrogen sulfide can aide opportunistic bacteria grow leading to antibiotic resistance. Future research on controlling hydrogen sulfide production may help address B. wadsworthia's contribution to diseases.

=== Culture growth on Bacteroides Bile esculin (BBE) agar ===
B. wadsworthia must be incubated on BBE agar for at least 3 days in order to see colony formation. Two types of colonies appear. A 1-2 mm diameter convex and irregular colony with a black center or a translucent umbonate and circular colony with a dark center. BBE agar is the optimal agar for B. wadsworthia colony growth.

=== Culture growth on Brucella agar ===
B. wadsworthia must be incubated on Brucella agar for at least 4 days. Colonies are 0.6-0.8 mm in diameter and appear gray and translucent with a raised, circular and erose morphology.

=== Location ===
B. wadsworthia are mostly found in the lower gastrointestinal tract. This bacterium is considered virulent in nature because it is commonly found in patients with appendicitis, gangrenous appendicitis, and the blood cultures of patients with liver abscesses; it is the third-most abundant anaerobic bacterium found in patients with appendicitis. Also, they are found in the feces samples of healthy patients. In non-human cases, this bacterium is found in dogs with periodontal disease. In rare cases, this bacterium may be found in saliva and vaginal samples.

Other specimen locations where B. wadsworthia have been found include:

- Scrotal abscess
- Mandibular osteomyelitis
- Axillary Hidradenitis suppurativa
- Sepsis
- Cholecystitis
- Bartholinitis

== Discovery ==
B. wadsworthia was first identified in 1988 by Ellen Jo Baron, who was director of the Clinical Anaerobic Bacteriology Research Laboratory at the V.A. Wadsworth Medical Center (now the West Los Angeles VA Medical Center) which is the source of its name. It was found in specimens collected from patients with perforated appendicitis and gangrenous appendicitis; the bacterium was also found in healthy fecal specimens. This bacterium was categorized into the genus Bilophila because of its bile-loving, hedonistic nature.
