= Desulfovibrio bizertensis =

Scientific classification
- Domain: Bacteria
- Kingdom: Pseudomonadati
- Phylum: Thermodesulfobacteriota
- Class: Desulfovibrionia
- Order: Desulfovibrionales
- Family: Desulfovibrionaceae
- Genus: Desulfovibrio
- Species: D. bizertensis

Binomial name
- Desulfovibrio bizertensis Haouari et al. 2006

Type strain
- DSM 18034, NCIMB 14199, MB3

Synonyms
- Paradesulfovibrio bizertensis (Haouari et al. 2006) Waite et al. 2020

Species of bacterium

Desulfovibrio bizertensis is a weakly halotolerant, strictly anaerobic, sulfate-reducing and motile bacterium from the genus Desulfovibrio which has been isolated from marine sediments from Tunisia.
