= Desulfovibrio biadhensis =

Scientific classification
- Domain: Bacteria
- Kingdom: Pseudomonadati
- Phylum: Thermodesulfobacteriota
- Class: Desulfovibrionia
- Order: Desulfovibrionales
- Family: Desulfovibrionaceae
- Genus: Desulfovibrio
- Species: D. biadhensis

Binomial name
- Desulfovibrio biadhensis Fadhlaoui et al. 2015

Type strain
- DSM 28904, KhalBD4, JCM 30146

Species of bacterium

Desulfovibrio biadhensis is a Gram-negative, non-spore-forming, anaerobic, mesophilic, slightly halophilic, sulfate-reducing and motile bacterium from the genus Desulfovibrio which has been isolated from a thermal spring in Tunisia.
