= Oceanidesulfovibrio gabonensis =

Scientific classification
- Domain: Bacteria
- Kingdom: Pseudomonadati
- Phylum: Thermodesulfobacteriota
- Class: Desulfovibrionia
- Order: Desulfovibrionales
- Family: Desulfovibrionaceae
- Genus: Oceanidesulfovibrio
- Species: O. gabonensis

Binomial name
- Oceanidesulfovibrio gabonensis (Tardy-Jacquenod et al. 1996) Galushko and Kuever 2021

Synonyms
- Desulfovibrio gabonensis Tardy-Jacquenod et al. 1996

Species of bacterium

Oceanidesulfovibrio gabonensis is a moderately halophilic sulfate-reducing bacterium. Its cells are motile curved rods that have a single polar flagellum. Its type strain is SEBR 2840 (= DSM 10636).
