= Solidesulfovibrio =

Scientific classification
- Domain: Bacteria
- Kingdom: Pseudomonadati
- Phylum: Thermodesulfobacteriota
- Class: Desulfovibrionia
- Order: Desulfovibrionales
- Family: Desulfovibrionaceae
- Genus: Solidesulfovibrio; Waite et al. 2020

Type species
- Solidesulfovibrio fructosivorans (Ollivier et al. 1990) Waite et al. 2020

Species
- S. aerotolerans; S. alcoholivorans; S. burkinensis; S. carbinolicus; S. carbinoliphilus; S. fructosivorans; S. magneticus; S. marrakechensis

Genus of bacterium

Solidesulfovibrio is a bacterium genus in the family Desulfovibrionaceae.

== Phylogeny ==
The currently accepted taxonomy is based on the List of Prokaryotic names with Standing in Nomenclature (LPSN) and National Center for Biotechnology Information (NCBI).

16S rRNA based LTP_10_2024

- Solidesulfovibrio
  - - S. carbinoliphilus (Allen et al. 2008) Waite et al. 2020
    - - S. marrakechensis (Chamkh et al. 2009) Waite et al. 2020
      - - S. alcoholivorans (Qatibi et al. 1995) Waite et al. 2020
        - S. fructosivorans (Ollivier et al. 1990) Waite et al. 2020
  - - S. aerotolerans (Mogensen et al. 2009) Waite et al. 2020
    - - S. carbinolicus (Nanninga and Gottschal 1995) Waite et al. 2020
      - - S. burkinensis (Ouattara et al. 1999) Waite et al. 2020
        - S. magneticus (Sakaguchi et al. 2002) Waite et al. 2020

120 marker proteins based GTDB 10-RS226

- Solidesulfovibrio
  - - S. carbinoliphilus
    - - S. alcoholivorans
      - S. fructosivorans
  - - S. aerotolerans
    - - S. carbinolicus
      - S. magneticus

== See also ==
- List of bacterial orders
- List of bacteria genera
