= Humidesulfovibrio idahonensis =

Scientific classification
- Domain: Bacteria
- Kingdom: Pseudomonadati
- Phylum: Thermodesulfobacteriota
- Class: Desulfovibrionia
- Order: Desulfovibrionales
- Family: Desulfovibrionaceae
- Genus: Humidesulfovibrio
- Species: H. idahonensis

Binomial name
- Humidesulfovibrio idahonensis (Sass et al. 2009) Waite et al. 2020

Species of bacterium

Humidesulfovibrio idahonensis is a bacterium. It contains c-type cytochromes and reduces sulfate, sulfite, thiosulfate, elemental sulfur, DMSO, anthraquinone disulfonate and fumarate. The type strain is CY1^{T} (=DSM 15450^{T} =JCM 14124^{T}). Originally described under Desulfovibrio, it was reassigned to Humidesulfovibrio by Waite et al. in 2020.
