= Desulfovibrio gracilis =

Scientific classification
- Domain: Bacteria
- Kingdom: Pseudomonadati
- Phylum: Thermodesulfobacteriota
- Class: Desulfovibrionia
- Order: Desulfovibrionales
- Family: Desulfovibrionaceae
- Genus: Desulfovibrio
- Species: D. gracilis

Binomial name
- Desulfovibrio gracilis Magot et al. 2004

Synonyms
- Paucidesulfovibrio gracilis (Magot et al. 2004) Waite et al. 2020

Species of bacterium

Desulfovibrio gracilis is a moderately halophilic bacteria. It is sulfate-reducing, mesophilic and motile. Its type strain is SRL6146^{T} (=DSM 16080^{T} =ATCC BAA-904^{T}).

== See also ==
- List of bacterial orders
- List of bacteria genera
