= Desulfonatronovibrio thiodismutans =

Scientific classification
- Domain: Bacteria
- Kingdom: Pseudomonadati
- Phylum: Thermodesulfobacteriota
- Class: Desulfovibrionia
- Order: Desulfovibrionales
- Family: Desulfonatronovibrionaceae
- Genus: Desulfonatronovibrio
- Species: D. thiodismutans

Binomial name
- Desulfonatronovibrio thiodismutans Sorokin et al. 2011

Species of bacterium

Desulfonatronovibrio thiodismutans is a species of haloalkaliphilic sulfate-reducing bacteria. It is able to grow lithotrophically by dismutation of thiosulfate and sulfite.
