= Desulfovibrio oxyclinae =

Scientific classification
- Domain: Bacteria
- Kingdom: Pseudomonadati
- Phylum: Thermodesulfobacteriota
- Class: Desulfovibrionia
- Order: Desulfovibrionales
- Family: Desulfovibrionaceae
- Genus: Desulfovibrio
- Species: D. oxyclinae

Binomial name
- Desulfovibrio oxyclinae Krekeler et al. 1997

Species of bacterium

Desulfovibrio oxyclinae is a bacterium. It is sulfate-reducing, and was first isolated from the upper 3mm layer of a hypersaline cyanobacterial mat in Sinai.
