= Desulfonatronovibrio hydrogenovorans =

Scientific classification
- Domain: Bacteria
- Kingdom: Pseudomonadati
- Phylum: Thermodesulfobacteriota
- Class: Desulfovibrionia
- Order: Desulfovibrionales
- Family: Desulfonatronovibrionaceae
- Genus: Desulfonatronovibrio
- Species: D. hydrogenovorans

Binomial name
- Desulfonatronovibrio hydrogenovorans Zhilina et al. 1997

Species of bacterium

Desulfonatronovibrio hydrogenovorans is a bacterium, the type species of its genus. It is an alkaliphilic, sulfate-reducing and motile bacterium. It is obligately sodium-dependent and its type strain is Z-7935 (= DSM 9292).
