= Desulfohalobium retbaense =

Scientific classification
- Domain: Bacteria
- Kingdom: Pseudomonadati
- Phylum: Thermodesulfobacteriota
- Class: Desulfovibrionia
- Order: Desulfovibrionales
- Family: Desulfohalobiaceae
- Genus: Desulfohalobium
- Species: D. retbaense

Binomial name
- Desulfohalobium retbaense Ollivier et al. 1991

Species of bacterium

Desulfohalobium retbaense is a bacterium and serves as the type species of its genus. It is halophilic, sulfate-reducing, motile, nonsporulating and rod-shaped with polar flagella. The type strain is strain DSM 5692. Its genome has been sequenced.
