= Pseudodesulfovibrio =

Scientific classification
- Domain: Bacteria
- Kingdom: Pseudomonadati
- Phylum: Thermodesulfobacteriota
- Class: Desulfovibrionia
- Order: Desulfovibrionales
- Family: Desulfovibrionaceae
- Genus: Pseudodesulfovibrio; Cao et al. 2016

Type species
- Pseudodesulfovibrio indicus Cao et al. 2016

Species
- See text

Synonyms
- "Salidesulfovibrio" Park et al. 2022

Genus of bacterium

Pseudodesulfovibrio is a bacterium genus in the family Desulfovibrionaceae.

== Phylogeny ==
The currently accepted taxonomy is based on the List of Prokaryotic names with Standing in Nomenclature (LPSN) and National Center for Biotechnology Information (NCBI).

16S rRNA based LTP_10_2024

- Pseudodesulfovibrio
  - - P. tunisiensis
    - - P. senegalensis
      - - P. halophilus (Caumette et al. 1991) Waite et al. 2020
        - "P. oxyclinae"
  - - - P. aespoeensis
      - P. alkaliphilus
    - - - P. piezophilus
        - P. profundus
      - - P. portus
        - - - P. nedwellii
            - P. sediminis
          - - P. mercurii
            - - P. indicus
              - - P. hydrargyri
                - "P. dechloracetivorans" Sun et al. 2000 ex Galushko & Kuever 2019

120 marker proteins based GTDB 10-RS226

- Pseudodesulfovibrio
  - - - "Paradesulfovibrio onnuriensis" Kim et al. 2020
      - P. senegalensis (Thioye et al. 2017) Galushko and Kuever 2021
    - - "P. brasiliensis" Warthmann et al. 2005 ex Waite et al. 2020
      - "P. oxyclinae" (Krekeler et al. 2000) Galushko & Kuever 2019
  - - P. tunisiensis(Ben Ali Gam et al. 2009) Waite et al. 2020
    - - - - P. aespoeensis (Motamedi and Pedersen 1998) Cao et al. 2016
          - - P. alkaliphilus Frolova et al. 2022
            - P. pelocollis Slobodkina et al. 2024
        - - P. piezophilus (Khelaifia et al. 2011) Cao et al. 2016
          - - "P. cashew" Zheng, Wu & Sun 2021
            - P. profundus (Bale et al. 1997) Cao et al. 2016
      - - - P. nedwellii Kondo 2023
          - P. sediminis Takahashi et al. 2022
        - - P. portus (Suzuki et al. 2010) Cao et al. 2016
          - - P. indicus Cao et al. 2016
            - - "P. thermohalotolerans" Gaikwad et al. 2023
              - - P. hydrargyri Ranchou-Peyruse et al. 2018
                - P. mercurii Gilmour et al. 2021

Species incertae sedis:

- P. karagichevae Bidzhieva et al. 2025
- P. methanolicus Bidzhieva et al. 2025

== See also ==
- List of bacterial orders
- List of bacteria genera
