= Maridesulfovibrio =

Scientific classification
- Domain: Bacteria
- Kingdom: Pseudomonadati
- Phylum: Thermodesulfobacteriota
- Class: Desulfovibrionia
- Order: Desulfovibrionales
- Family: Desulfovibrionaceae
- Genus: Maridesulfovibrio; Waite et al. 2020

Type species
- Maridesulfovibrio salexigens (Postgate and Campbell 1966) Waite et al. 2020

Species
- M. bastinii; M. ferrireducens; M. frigidus; "M. gilichinskyi"; M. hydrothermalis; "M. lacusfryxellense"; M. salexigens; M. salinus; "M. zosterae"

Genus of bacterium

Maridesulfovibrio is a bacterium genus in the family Desulfovibrionaceae.

== Phylogeny ==
The currently accepted taxonomy is based on the List of Prokaryotic names with Standing in Nomenclature (LPSN) and National Center for Biotechnology Information (NCBI).

16S rRNA based LTP_10_2024

- Maridesulfovibrio
  - M. bastinii (Magot et al. 2004) Waite et al. 2020
  - - - M. salexigens (Postgate and Campbell 1966) Waite et al. 2020
      - M. salinus (Ben Ali Gam et al. 2018) Galushko and Kuever 2021
    - - - M. hydrothermalis (Alazard et al. 2003) Waite et al. 2020
        - "M. zosterae" (Nielsen et al. 1999) Waite et al. 2020
      - - "M. gilichinskyi" (Ryzhmanova et al. 2019) Galushko & Kuever 2021
        - - M. ferrireducens (Vandieken et al. 2006) Waite et al. 2020
          - M. frigidus (Vandieken et al. 2006) Waite et al. 2020

120 marker proteins based GTDB 10-RS226

- Maridesulfovibrio
  - M. bastinii
  - - - M. hydrothermalis
      - - M. salexigens
        - "M. zosterae"
    - - M. frigidus
      - - M. ferrireducens
        - "M. gilichinskyi"

== See also ==
- List of bacterial orders
- List of bacteria genera
