= Taurine—pyruvate aminotransferase =

Taurine-pyruvate aminotransferase

Identifiers
- EC no.: 2.6.1.77

Databases
- IntEnz: IntEnz view
- BRENDA: BRENDA entry
- ExPASy: NiceZyme view
- KEGG: KEGG entry
- MetaCyc: metabolic pathway
- PRIAM: profile
- PDB structures: RCSB PDB PDBe PDBsum
- Gene Ontology: AmiGO / QuickGO
Search
- PMC: articles
- PubMed: articles
- NCBI: proteins

Taurine-pyruvate aminotransferase (EC 2.6.1.77) is an enzyme that catalyzes the chemical reaction.

taurine
+
pyruvic acid
alanine
+
sulfoacetaldehyde

The two substrates of this enzyme characterised from Bilophila wadsworthia and Rhodobacter capsulatus are taurine and pyruvic acid. Its products are L-alanine and sulfoacetaldehyde. The same enzyme in Paracoccus denitrificans can use hypotaurine, which gives sulfite and acetaldehyde after spontaneous hydrolysis of the initial product.

This enzyme is a transferase, specifically a transaminase, which transfer nitrogenous groups. The systematic name of this enzyme class is taurine:pyruvate aminotransferase. It is also called Tpa.
