= Fundidesulfovibrio =

Scientific classification
- Domain: Bacteria
- Kingdom: Pseudomonadati
- Phylum: Thermodesulfobacteriota
- Class: Desulfovibrionia
- Order: Desulfovibrionales
- Family: Desulfovibrionaceae
- Genus: Fundidesulfovibrio; Waite et al. 2020

Type species
- Fundidesulfovibrio putealis (Basso et al. 2005) Waite et al. 2020

Species
- See text

Genus of bacterium

Fundidesulfovibrio is a bacterium genus in the family Desulfovibrionaceae.

== Phylogeny ==
The currently accepted taxonomy is based on the List of Prokaryotic names with Standing in Nomenclature (LPSN) and National Center for Biotechnology Information (NCBI).

16S rRNA based LTP_10_2024

- Fundidesulfovibrio
  - - F. butyratiphilus (Suzuki et al. 2010) Galushko and Kuever 2021
    - F. putealis (Basso et al. 2005) Waite et al. 2020
  - - - F. agrisoli Yang et al. 2023
      - F. soli Yang et al. 2023
    - - F. magnetotacticus Shimoshige et al. 2022
      - F. terrae Yang et al. 2023

120 marker proteins based GTDB 10-RS226

- Fundidesulfovibrio
  - - F. agrisoli
    - F. soli
  - - F. magnetotacticus
    - - F. putealis
      - F. terrae

== See also ==
- List of bacterial orders
- List of bacteria genera
