= Desulfovibrio desulfuricans =

Scientific classification
- Domain: Bacteria
- Kingdom: Pseudomonadati
- Phylum: Thermodesulfobacteriota
- Class: Desulfovibrionia
- Order: Desulfovibrionales
- Family: Desulfovibrionaceae
- Genus: Desulfovibrio
- Species: D. desulfuricans

Binomial name
- Desulfovibrio desulfuricans (Beijerinck 1895) Kluyver and van Niel 1936

Synonyms
- Spirillum desulfuricans Beijerinck 1895; Bacillus desulfuricans Saltet 1900; Microspira desulfuricans Migula 1900; Vibrio cholinicus Haywood and Stadtman 1959

Species of bacterium

Desulfovibrio desulfuricans is a Gram-negative sulfate-reducing bacteria. It is generally found in soil, water, and the stools of animals, although in rare cases it has been found to cause infection in humans. It is particularly noted for its ability to produce methyl mercury. The reductive glycine pathway, a seventh route for organisms to capture CO_{2}, was discovered in this species. Since these bacteria are killed by exposure to atmospheric oxygen, the environmental niches most frequently occupied by these bacteria are anaerobic. Desulfovibrio desulfuricans 27774 was reported to produce gene transfer agents.

== Morphology ==
Desulfovibrio desulfuricans has been described as a motile, rod-shaped, Gram-negative obligate anaerobe with polar flagella. It measures approximately 3 μm by 0.5 μm.
