= Desulfovibrio capillatus =

Scientific classification
- Domain: Bacteria
- Kingdom: Pseudomonadati
- Phylum: Thermodesulfobacteriota
- Class: Desulfovibrionia
- Order: Desulfovibrionales
- Family: Desulfovibrionaceae
- Genus: Desulfovibrio
- Species: D. capillatus

Binomial name
- Desulfovibrio capillatus Miranda-Tello et al. 2013

Type strain
- CIP 107483, DSM 14982, MET 2

Species of bacterium

Desulfovibrio capillatus is a Gram-negative and sulfate-reducing bacterium from the genus Desulfovibrio which has been isolated from an oil field separator in the Gulf of Mexico.
