= Adenosine-phosphate deaminase =

Class of enzymes

Identifiers
- EC no.: 3.5.4.17
- CAS no.: 37289-20-6

Databases
- BRENDA: enzyme data
- ExPASy: NiceZyme view
- KEGG: enzyme entry
- MetaCyc: metabolic pathway
- Rhea: reactions
- PDB structures: RCSB PDB PDBe PDBsum
- Gene Ontology: AmiGO / QuickGO
Search
- PMC: articles
- PubMed: articles
- NCBI: proteins

Adenosine-phosphate deaminase (EC 3.5.4.17) is an enzyme originally characterised from Porphyra crispata and Desulfovibrio desulfuricans that catalyzes several related hydrolysis reactions which, for example, convert adenosine monophosphate (AMP) to inosinic acid and ammonia.

== Classification ==
This enzyme is a hydrolase, one acting on carbon-nitrogen bonds other than peptide bonds, specifically in cyclic amidines. The systematic name of this enzyme class is adenosine-phosphate aminohydrolase. Other names in use include adenylate deaminase, adenine nucleotide deaminase, and adenosine (phosphate) deaminase.

The EC number for adenosine-phosphate deaminase is [EC 3.5.4.17]. The class is (EC 3) for hydrolase. Hydrolases are enzymes that catalyze bond cleavage by reaction with water. The sub-class refers to adenosine-phosphate deaminase acting on carbon-nitrogen bonds, other than peptide bonds. The sub-sub-class refers to the type of substrate the enzyme is binding to, in this case, cyclic amidines. The final number (17) indicates that adenosine-phosphate deaminase binds to 5'-adenosine monophosphate.

== Reaction catalysed ==
Adenosine-phosphate deaminase converts adenosine monophosphate (AMP) to inosinic acid and ammonia by hydrolysis. The enzyme binds to AMP and uses water to break the C-N bond and replace it with a carbonyl group. Other substrates of the class depend on their origin, however, all of them deaminate adenosine, 2'-deoxyadenosine, AMP, and 3',5'-cyclic AMP. Inhibitors of adenosine-phosphate deaminase include Mn^{2+} (neutral or alkaline pH), F^{−}, Fe^{3+}, CN^{−}, Co^{2+}, Zn^{2+}, and Hg^{2+}.

adenosine monophosphate
H_{2}O
NH_{3}
inosinic acid

== Species distribution ==
Adenosine-phosphate deaminase is found in most, if not all organisms in all tissues, however, muscle tissue is the richest source. The basic pathway of adenosine-phosphate deaminase is to replace a C-N bond of a AMP to give inosine monophosphate (IMP, inosinic acid). IMP is then used by inosine-5′-monophosphate dehydrogenase in guanine nucleotide biosynthesis. This is at the center of cell growth and proliferation. Specifically within marine mollusks, studies suggest that adenosine-phosphate deaminases are widely distributed across the phylum. However, it was noticed that the pathways varied within each individual species, suggesting that different substrates are preferred within different species. The source organisms for this enzyme are Porphyra crispata, Desulfovibrio desulfuricans, and Aspergillus species.

== Crystal Structure ==
Molecular weight of adenosine-phosphate deaminase is 30000-60000 Da or 15223 Da. The number of amino acid sequences is 135. There are no transmembrane helices.

== Active Site ==
The turnover number for adenosine-phosphate deaminase is 690 ATP, 630 ADP, and 710 AMP. The k_{m} value is 0.047 for AMP, with pH optimum at 6.0-6.8. However the pH range is 4-8 with a temperature optimum of 55 °C. The main substrate for this enzyme is AMP but it can also act on several other adenine-containing compounds.
