= Quinone-interacting membrane-bound oxidoreductase =

Quinone-interacting membrane-bound oxidoreductase is a membrane-bound protein complex present in the electron transport chain of sulfate reducers (e.g. Desulfovibrio species) and some sulfur oxidizers.

It was first described by Pires et al. (2003).
