= Desulfonatronum thiosulfatophilum =

Scientific classification
- Domain: Bacteria
- Kingdom: Pseudomonadati
- Phylum: Thermodesulfobacteriota
- Class: Desulfovibrionia
- Order: Desulfovibrionales
- Family: Desulfonatronaceae
- Genus: Desulfonatronum
- Species: D. thiosulfatophilum

Binomial name
- Desulfonatronum thiosulfatophilum Sorokin et al. 2011

Species of bacterium

Desulfonatronum thiosulfatophilum is a species of haloalkaliphilic sulfate-reducing bacteria. It is able to grow lithotrophically by dismutation of thiosulfate and sulfite.
