= Desulfovibrio burkinensis =

Scientific classification
- Domain: Bacteria
- Kingdom: Pseudomonadati
- Phylum: Thermodesulfobacteriota
- Class: Desulfovibrionia
- Order: Desulfovibrionales
- Family: Desulfovibrionaceae
- Genus: Desulfovibrio
- Species: D. burkinensis

Binomial name
- Desulfovibrio burkinensis Ouattara et al. 1999

Type strain
- ATCC 700846, DSM 6830, HDv

Synonyms
- Desulfovibrio burkinabensis

Species of bacterium

Desulfovibrio burkinensis is a Gram-negative, non-spore-forming and sulfate-reducing bacterium from the genus of Desulfovibrio which has been isolated from soil from a ricefield in Burkina Faso in Africa.
