= Desulfonatronum thiodismutans =

Scientific classification
- Domain: Bacteria
- Kingdom: Pseudomonadati
- Phylum: Thermodesulfobacteriota
- Class: Desulfovibrionia
- Order: Desulfovibrionales
- Family: Desulfonatronaceae
- Genus: Desulfonatronum
- Species: D. thiodismutans

Binomial name
- Desulfonatronum thiodismutans Pikuta et al. 2003

Species of bacterium

Desulfonatronum thiodismutans is an alkaliphilic, sulfate-reducing bacterium capable of lithoautotrophic growth. It is Gram-negative, vibrio-shaped, with cells 0.6–0.7×1.2–2.7 μm in size, motile by a single polar flagellum. Its type strain is MLF1^{T} (=ATCC BAA-395^{T} =DSM 14708^{T}).
