= Lactylation =

Post-translational modification

Skeletal formula of lactate, the conjugate base of lactic acid.

Lactylation is a post-translational modification (PTM) of proteins in which a lactyl group is added to an amino acid in the protein sequence, most commonly lysine. The lactyl group is an acyl, making lactylation a type of lysine acylation. Lactylation is common among histones and other proteins, and is involved in numerous biological processes including inflammation, embryonic development, tumor proliferation, and metabolism.

The low incidence of lysine lactylation relative to intracellular lactate concentrations suggests it may be occurring as non-canonical outcome, i.e. a side-effect of enzymes with binding domains not mainly active on lactate derivatives.

== Examples ==
Lactylated proteins and specific modification sites have been identified in organisms across a very wide taxonomic distance, including mouse brain cells, Trypanosoma brucei (the pathogen responsible for African sleeping sickness), Botrytis cinerea, rice grains (Oryza sativa and others), gastric cancer cells, Frankliniella occidentalis, HEK 293 cells, Phialophora verrucosa, and Escherichia coli.
