= D. capillatus =

D. capillatus may refer to:

- Decapauropus capillatus, a species of pauropod
- Desulfovibrio capillatus, a species of bacteria
- Dolicheremaeus capillatus, a species of mite
