= Halodesulfovibrio =

Scientific classification
- Domain: Bacteria
- Kingdom: Pseudomonadati
- Phylum: Thermodesulfobacteriota
- Class: Desulfovibrionia
- Order: Desulfovibrionales
- Family: Desulfovibrionaceae
- Genus: Halodesulfovibrio; Shivani et al. 2017

Type species
- Halodesulfovibrio aestuarii (Postgate & Campbell 1966) Shivani et al. 2017

Species
- H. aestuarii; "Ca. H. lyudaonia"; H. marinisediminis; H. oceani; H. spirochaetisodalis

Synonyms
- "Psychrodesulfovibrio" Galushko & Kuever 2020

Genus of bacterium

Halodesulfovibrio is a bacterium genus in the family Desulfovibrionaceae.

== Phylogeny ==
The currently accepted taxonomy is based on the List of Prokaryotic names with Standing in Nomenclature (LPSN) and National Center for Biotechnology Information (NCBI).

16S rRNA based LTP_10_2024

- - "Psychrodesulfovibrio"
    - "P. psychrotolerans" (Sasi Jyothsna et al. 2008) Galushko & Kuever 2020
    - "P. subterraneus" (Ueno et al. 2021) Park et al. 2022
  - Halodesulfovibrio
    - - H. marinisediminis (Takii et al. 2008) Shivani et al. 2017
      - H. spirochaetisodalis Shivani et al. 2017
    - - H. aestuarii (Postgate & Campbell 1966) Shivani et al. 2017
      - H. oceani (Finster and Kjeldsen 2012) Shivani et al. 2017

120 marker proteins based GTDB 10-RS226

- Halodesulfovibrio
  - (Psychrodesulfovibrio)
    - Desulfovibrio psychrotolerans Sasi Jyothsna et al. 2008
    - - "Desulfovibrio mangrovi" Zhou, Zhang & Li 2023
      - Desulfovibrio subterraneus Ueno et al. 2021
  - (Halodesulfovibrio)
    - H. aestuarii
    - - H. marinisediminis
      - H. spirochaetisodalis

== See also ==
- List of bacterial orders
- List of bacteria genera
