= Desulfosporomusa =

Scientific classification
- Domain: Bacteria
- Kingdom: Bacillati
- Phylum: Bacillota
- Class: Negativicutes
- Order: Veillonellales
- Family: Veillonellaceae
- Genus: Desulfosporomusa; Sass et al. 2004
- Species: D. polytropa

Binomial name
- Desulfosporomusa polytropa Sass et al. 2004

Monotypic genus of bacteria

Desulfosporomusa is a genus of sulfate-reducing bacteria. So far there is only one species of this genus known (Desulfosporomusa polytropa).

== See also ==
- List of bacterial orders
- List of bacteria genera
