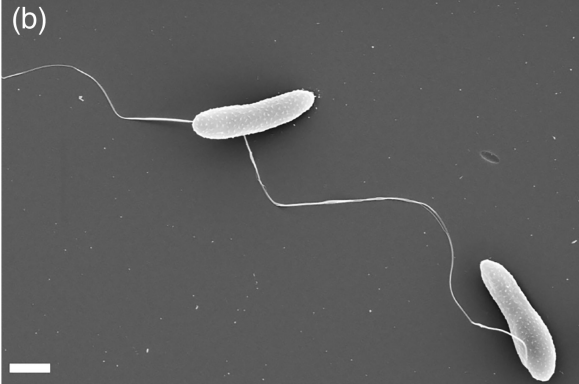
- Desulfosporosinus paludis

Scientific classification
- Domain: Bacteria
- Kingdom: Bacillati
- Phylum: Bacillota
- Class: Clostridia
- Order: Eubacteriales
- Family: Desulfitobacteriaceae
- Genus: Desulfosporosinus; Stackebrandt et al. 1997

Type species
- Desulfosporosinus orientis (Adams & Postgate 1959) Stackebrandt et al. 1997

Species
- See text

= Desulfosporosinus =

Genus of bacteria

Desulfosporosinus is a genus of strictly anaerobic, sulfate-reducing bacteria, often found in soil.

The type species D. orientis was isolated in 1959 with the proposed name Desulfovibrio orientis, and was later assigned to the genus Desulfotomaculum. Based on 16S rRNA gene sequence data Desulfotomaculum orientis was reclassified as Desulfosporosinus orientis in 1997.

== Species ==
Species	Type strain	Isolated from	Notes	References
D. acididurans	M1 (DSM 27692)	Acidic sediment	moderately acidophilic	
D. acidiphilus	SJ4 (DSM 22704)	Acid mine drainage sediment	moderately acidophilic	
D. auripigmenti	OREX-4 (DSM 13351)	Freshwater sediment		
D. burensis	BSREI1 (DSM 24089)	Borehole		
D. fructosivorans	63.6F (DSM140297)	Marine subsurface sediment		
D. hippei	343 (DSM 8344)	Permafrost soil		
D. lacus	STP12 (DSM 15449)	Freshwater sediment		
D. meridiei	S10 (DSM 13257)	Gasolene-contaminated groundwater		
D. nitroreducens	59.4B (DSM 140295)	Marine subsurface sediment		
D. orientis	Singapore I (DSM 765)	Soil		
D. youngiae	JW/YJL-B18 (DSM 17734)	Constructed wetland / acid mine drainage sediment		

== Genomes ==
Five complete Desulfosporosinus genomes are available, and another two genomes are in the progress of being sequenced.

Strain	Status	Year	Accession number	References
D. acididurans M1	Published draft	2015	LDZY00000000	
D. acidiphilus SJ4	Complete and published	2012	CP003639	
D. meridiei S10	Complete and published	2012	CP003629	
D. orientis Singapore I	Complete and published	2011	CP003108	
D. sp. OT	Complete and published	2011	AGAF00000000	
D. youngiae JW/YJL-B18	Complete and published	2011	CM001441	

== Phylogeny ==
The currently accepted taxonomy is based on the List of Prokaryotic names with Standing in Nomenclature (LPSN) and National Center for Biotechnology Information (NCBI).

16S rRNA based LTP_10_2024

- Desulfosporosinus
  - - D. orientis (Adams & Postgate 1959) Stackebrandt et al. 1997
    - - D. acididurans Sanchez-Andrea et al. 2015
      - D. acidiphilus Alazard et al. 2012
  - - - - D. auripigmenti corrig. (Newman et al. 2000) Stackebrandt et al. 2003
        - D. youngiae Lee, Romanek & Wiegel 2009
      - - D. hippei Vatsurina et al. 2008
        - D. meridiei Robertson et al. 2001
    - - - D. metallidurans Panova et al. 2021
        - D. nitroreducens Vandieken et al. 2017
      - - D. fructosivorans Vandieken et al. 2017
        - - D. burensis Mayeux et al. 2013
          - D. lacus Ramamoorthy et al. 2006

120 marker proteins based GTDB 10-RS226

- Desulfosporosinus
  - - "Ca. D. nitrosoreducens" He et al. 2024
    - - D. acididurans
      - D. acidiphilus
  - - D. metallidurans
    - - - D. fructosivorans
        - "Ca. D. infrequens" Hausmann et al. 2019
      - - - D. lacus
          - D. nitroreducens
        - - D. youngiae
          - - D. orientis
            - - D. hippei
              - D. meridiei

Unassigned species:

- D. paludis Dyksma et al. 2025
- "D. sediminicola" Jiang et al. 2025
- "D. shakirovi" Eskova et al. 2025
