= Isethionate sulfite-lyase =

Bacterial Enzyme

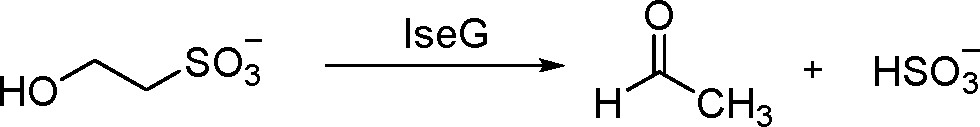
Degradation of Isethionate catalyzed by IslA.

Isethionate sulfite-lyase (IslA, IseA or IseG) is a glycyl radical enzyme that catalyzes the degradation of isethionate into acetaldehyde and sulfite through the cleavage of a carbon-sulfur bond. This conversion is a necessary step for taurine catabolism in anaerobic bacteria like Bilophila wadsworthia. IslA is activated by the enzyme IslB which uses S-adenoslymethionine (SAM) as the initial radical donor.

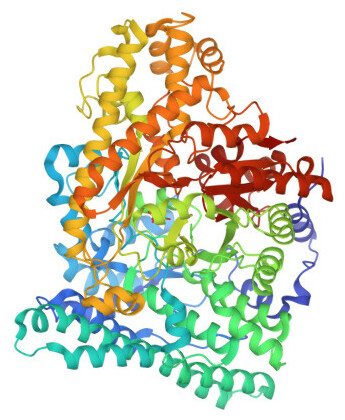
Crystallographic structure of isethionate sulfite-lyase (IslA) with substrate isethionate bound.

== Structure ==
IslA, like all other characterized glycyl radical enzymes, is a dimeric protein. The IslA monomer contains a barrel made of alpha helices that envelop two five-stranded half-beta barrels positioned antiparallel to each other. Hidden within this barrel is the active site of the enzyme. It is believed that the positioning of the active site within the barrel protects the radical species (formed during the activation of the enzyme) from solvent quenching.

== Function ==
=== Enzyme activation ===
Activation of IslA depends on binding of glycyl radical enyzme-activating enzyme IslB, which catalyzes the initial formation of the radical S-adenosylmethionine (rSAM) species. rSAM is formed by the one-electron reduction of an iron-sulfur cluster, and the resulting radical is stabilized by amino acid residues within the enzyme. The formation of the stable complex between the two enzymes and the binding of glycine in the active site of IslB are prerequisites for successful activation of IslA.

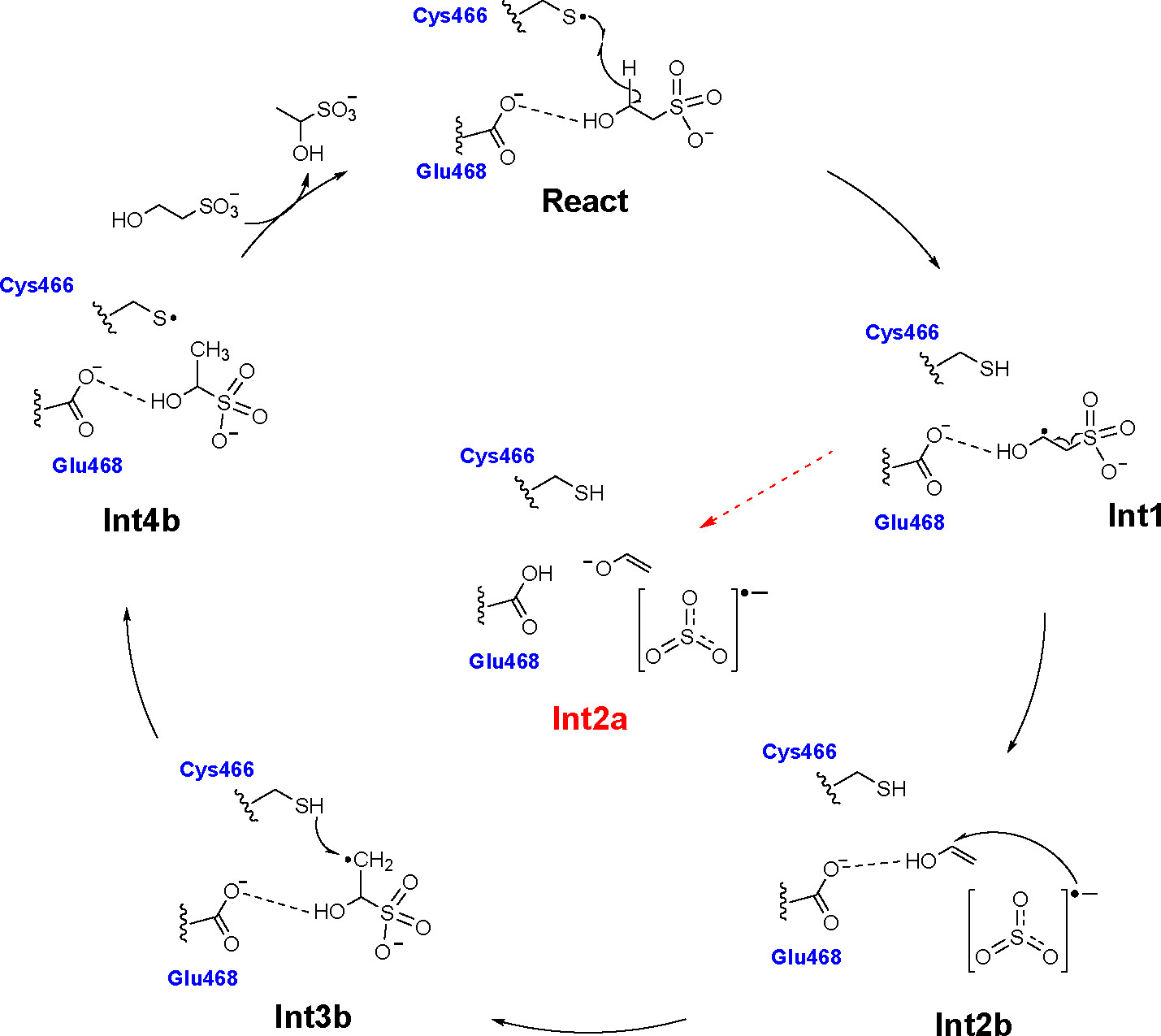
Migration mechanism of IseG suggested by Deng et al. after quantum mechanical and molecular mechanical calculations.

=== Mechanism of action ===
The radical-based cleavage of IslA is thought to occur through a direct elimination reaction. However, recent research indicates that a 1,2-SO_{3}-radical migration may occur after a catalytically active cysteine residue radical grabs a hydrogen atom from isethionate, followed by hydrogen atom transfer from cysteine to a 1-hydroxylethane-1-sulfonate radical intermediate. The elimination of sulfite from 1-hydroxylethane-1-sulfonate to result in the final product is likely to occur outside the enzyme. This mechanism is similar to the reported fragmentation-recombination mechanism of B_{12}-dependent glutamate mutase.

=== Evolution of structure ===
Radicals are very chemically unstable species and must be carefully controlled in biological systems. Research supports the theory that GREs converged on glycyl radical formation due to the better conformational accessibility of the glycine radical loop, rather than the highest radical stability of the formed peptide radicals.

== Physiological role ==
=== Disease ===
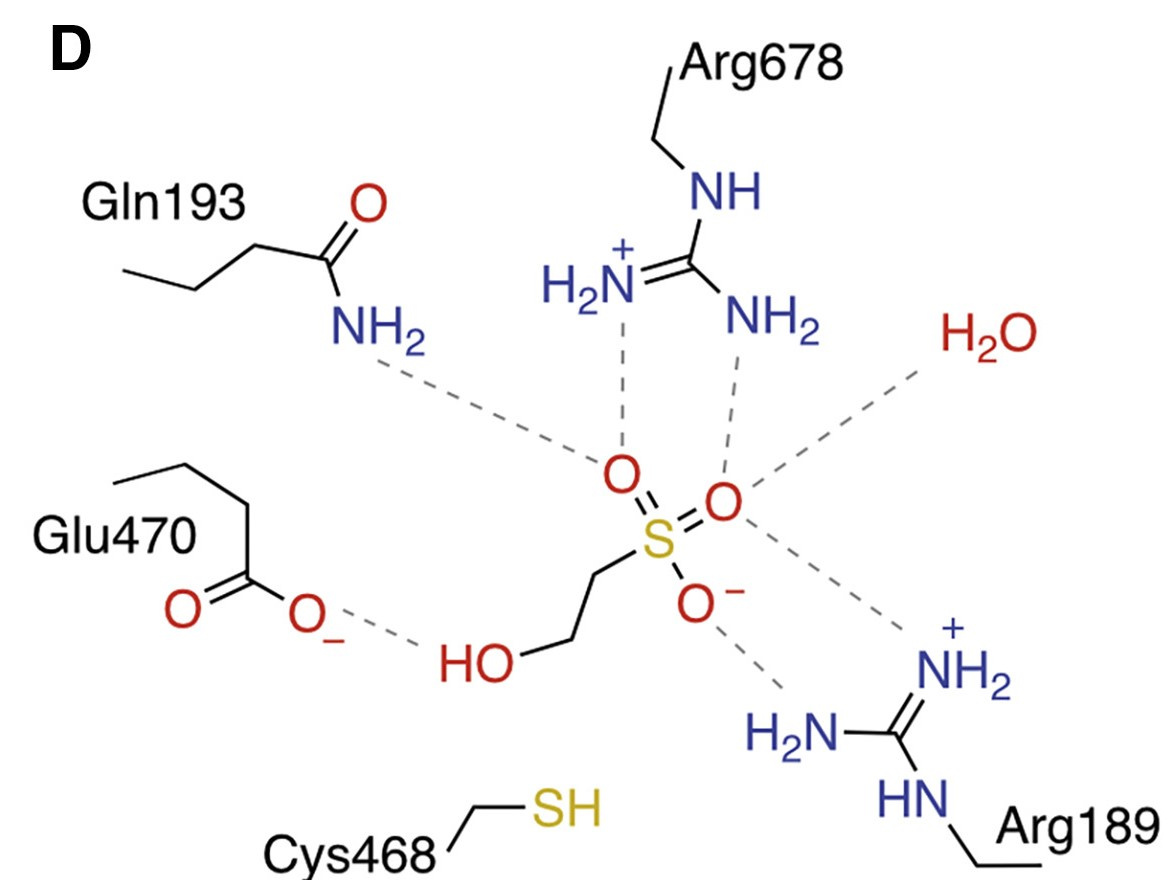
Isethionate sulfite-lyase active site hydrogen bond interaction with surrounding amino acid residues.

Isla produced by Bilophila wadsworthia is known to convert organosulfides including taurine and isethionate into acetaldehyde and sulfite. Sulfite is converted into hydrogen sulfide, which can degrade the mucous lining of the colon and cause pathological conditions including colorectal cancer, inflammatory bowel diseases, and colitis. Moreover, hydrogen sulfide has been known to induce antibiotic resistance suggesting that the production of this molecule could prompt blooms of opportunistic bacteria during antibiotic treatment. Conversely, hydrogen sulfide may also act as a signaling molecule within the homeostasis of a host's circulatory system such as regulating blood pressure control. Ultimately, although the role of hydrogen sulfide within disease may be unclear, efforts to find inhibitors for IslA may help mitigate the excess production of hydrogen sulfide.

=== Bacterial microcompartments ===
Within the same gene cluster that encodes IslA and IslB enzymes are several genes that encode shell proteins of bacterial microcompartments (BMCs). It has been found that the IslA and IslB enzymes are likely contained within BMCs which isolate the products of IslA (acetaldehyde and sulfite) from the cytosol and limits their harmful effects. Flavin molecules, which are also present in the BMCs, may be used to shuttle electrons to the IslB enzyme which is necessary to install the glycyl radical on the IslA enzyme upon activation.

== Industrial relevance ==
Anaerobic radical enzymes such as IslA have the potential to functionally modify a substrate without oxygen incorporation, requiring less expensive adaptation of downstream synthetic methodologies than from oxygen-rich biomass-derived feedstocks. The ability to catabolize amino acids to generate a broad range of branched and unbranched hydrocarbon chains could be useful in production of biofuels. In addition, radical catalysis enables a range of specialist reactions of industrial interest, including carbon-skeleton rearrangements, aminomutases, and eliminases.
