= Bilophila =

Scientific classification
- Domain: Bacteria
- Kingdom: Pseudomonadati
- Phylum: Thermodesulfobacteriota
- Class: Desulfovibrionia
- Order: Desulfovibrionales
- Family: Desulfovibrionaceae
- Genus: Bilophila; Baron et al. 1990

Species
- "Candidatus Bilophila faecipullorum" Gilroy et al. 2021; Bilophila wadsworthia Baron et al. 1990

Genus of bacteria

Bilophila is a genus of bacteria in the family Desulfovibrionaceae.
