= Lawsonia intracellularis =

Scientific classification
- Domain: Bacteria
- Kingdom: Pseudomonadati
- Phylum: Thermodesulfobacteriota
- Class: Desulfovibrionia
- Order: Desulfovibrionales
- Family: Desulfovibrionaceae
- Genus: Lawsonia; McOrist et al. 1995
- Species: L. intracellularis

Binomial name
- Lawsonia intracellularis McOrist et al. 1995

Species of bacterium

Lawsonia intracellularis is a species of bacterium. It is the only species in the genus Lawsonia. It is obligately intracellular and was isolated from intestines of pigs with proliferative enteropathy disease.

== Pathogenicity ==
Lawsonia intracellularis is highly pathogenic. The species has been associated with outbreaks of bacterial infection-associated protein losing enteropathy in horses.
