= Brucella agar =

Culture medium in microbiology

Brucella agar is a form of agar used to culture species of Brucella and Campylobacter jejuni
