= Hydrogensulfite reductase =

hydrogensulfite reductase

Identifiers
- EC no.: 1.8.99.3
- CAS no.: 9059-42-1

Databases
- IntEnz: IntEnz view
- BRENDA: BRENDA entry
- ExPASy: NiceZyme view
- KEGG: KEGG entry
- MetaCyc: metabolic pathway
- PRIAM: profile
- PDB structures: RCSB PDB PDBe PDBsum
- Gene Ontology: AmiGO / QuickGO
Search
- PMC: articles
- PubMed: articles
- NCBI: proteins

In enzymology, a hydrogensulfite reductase (EC 1.8.99.3) is an enzyme that catalyzes the chemical reaction

trithionate + acceptor + 2 H_{2}O + OH- $\rightleftharpoons$ 3 bisulfite + reduced acceptor

The 4 substrates of this enzyme are trithionate, acceptor, H_{2}O, and OH-, whereas its two products are bisulfite and reduced acceptor.

This enzyme belongs to the family of oxidoreductases, specifically those acting on a sulfur group of donors with other acceptors. The systematic name of this enzyme class is trithionate:acceptor oxidoreductase. Other names in common use include bisulfite reductase, dissimilatory sulfite reductase, desulfoviridin, desulforubidin, desulfofuscidin, dissimilatory-type sulfite reductase, and trithionate:(acceptor) oxidoreductase. It has 4 cofactors: iron, sulfur, siroheme, and iron-sulfur.
