= Desulfonatronum =

Scientific classification
- Domain: Bacteria
- Kingdom: Pseudomonadati
- Phylum: Proteobacteria
- Class: Desulfovibrionia
- Order: Desulfovibrionales
- Family: Desulfonatronaceae; Waite et al. 2020
- Genus: Desulfonatronum; Pikuta et al. 1998

Type species
- Desulfonatronum lacustre Pikuta et al. 1998

Species
- D. alkalitolerans; D. buryatense; D. cooperativum; D. lacustre; D. parangueonense; D. thioautotrophicum; D. thiodismutans; D. thiosulfatophilum; D. zhilinae

Genus of bacteria

Desulfonatronum is a Gram-negative and extremely alkaliphilic bacteria genus from the family Desulfonatronaceae.

== Phylogeny ==
The currently accepted taxonomy is based on the List of Prokaryotic names with Standing in Nomenclature (LPSN) and National Center for Biotechnology Information (NCBI).

16S rRNA based LTP_10_2024

- Desulfonatronum
  - - D. alkalitolerans Sorokin et al. 2013
    - D. cooperativum Zhilina et al. 2005
  - - - D. parangueonense Perez Bernal et al. 2017
      - D. thiosulfatophilum Sorokin et al. 2011
    - - - D. thioautotrophicum Sorokin et al. 2011
        - D. thiodismutans Pikuta et al. 2003
      - - D. lacustre Pikuta et al. 1998
        - - D. buryatense Ryzhmanova et al. 2014
          - D. zhilinae Zakharyuk et al. 2016

120 marker proteins based GTDB 10-RS226

- Desulfonatronum
  - D. thiosulfatophilum
  - - D. thioautotrophicum
    - - D. lacustre
      - D. thiodismutans

== See also ==
- List of bacterial orders
- List of bacteria genera
