= Desulfonatronovibrionaceae =

Scientific classification
- Domain: Bacteria
- Kingdom: Pseudomonadati
- Phylum: Proteobacteria
- Class: Desulfovibrionia
- Order: Desulfovibrionales
- Family: Desulfonatronovibrionaceae; Waite et al. 2020

Genera
- Desulfonatronospira; Desulfonatronovibrio

Family of bacteria

Desulfonatronovibrionaceae is a family of bacteria belonging to the phylum Thermodesulfobacteriota.
