= Desulfohalobiaceae =

Scientific classification
- Domain: Bacteria
- Kingdom: Pseudomonadati
- Phylum: Proteobacteria
- Class: Desulfovibrionia
- Order: Desulfovibrionales
- Family: Desulfohalobiaceae; Kuever et al. 2006

Genus
- Desulfohalobium

Family of bacteria

Desulfohalobiaceae is a family of bacteria belonging to the phylum Thermodesulfobacteriota.

== Phylogeny ==
The currently accepted taxonomy is based on the List of Prokaryotic names with Standing in Nomenclature (LPSN) and National Center for Biotechnology Information (NCBI).

16S rRNA based LTP_10_2024

- - - Desulfohalobiaceae
      - Desulfohalobium Ollivier et al. 1991
      - Desulfovermiculus Belyakova et al. 2007
  - - - Desulfothermaceae
        Desulfothermus Kuever, Rainey & Widdel 2006
      - Desulfonauticaceae
        Desulfonauticus Audiffrin et al. 2003
    - other

120 marker proteins based GTDB 10-RS226

- - Desulfohalobiaceae
    Desulfohalobium
  - Desulfothermaceae
    - Desulfovermiculus
    - Desulfothermus

== See also ==
- List of bacterial orders
- List of bacteria genera
