= Lactate =

Lactate may refer to:

- Lactation, the secretion of milk from the mammary glands
- Lactate, the conjugate base of lactic acid
