= Sulfate-reducing microorganism =

Microorganisms that "breathe" sulfates

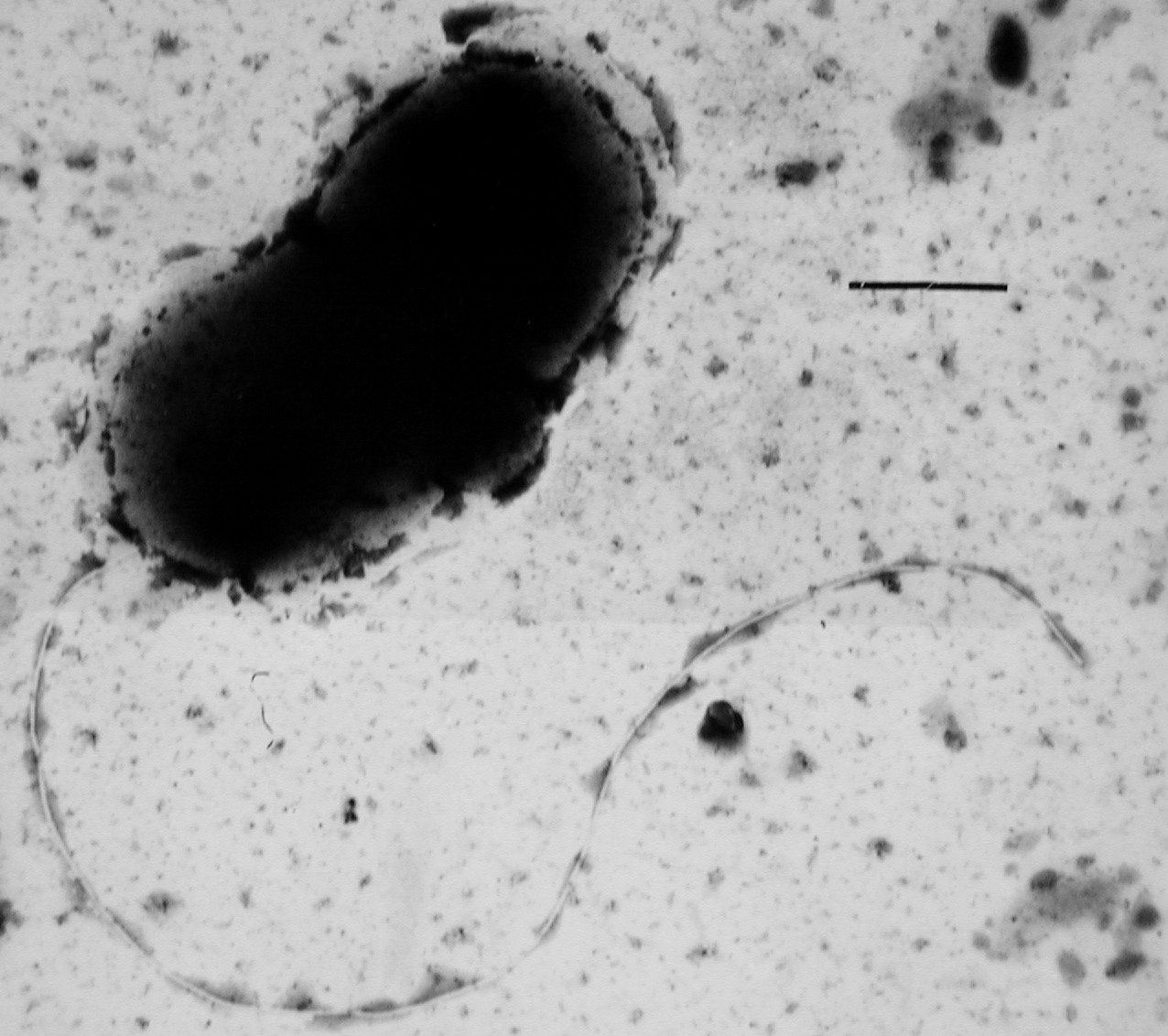
Desulfovibrio vulgaris is the best-studied sulfate-reducing microorganism species; the bar in the upper right is 0.5 micrometre long.

Sulfate-reducing microorganisms (SRM) or sulfate-reducing prokaryotes (SRP) are a group composed of sulfate-reducing bacteria (SRB) and sulfate-reducing archaea (SRA), both of which can perform anaerobic respiration utilizing sulfate (SO^{2−}_{4}) as terminal electron acceptor, reducing it to hydrogen sulfide (H_{2}S). Therefore, these sulfidogenic microorganisms "breathe" sulfate rather than molecular oxygen (O_{2}), which is the terminal electron acceptor reduced to water (H_{2}O) in aerobic respiration.

Most sulfate-reducing microorganisms can also reduce some other oxidized inorganic sulfur compounds, such as sulfite (SO^{2−}_{3}), dithionite (S_{2}O^{2−}_{4}), thiosulfate (S_{2}O^{2−}_{3}), trithionate (S_{3}O^{2−}_{6}), tetrathionate (S_{4}O^{2−}_{6}), elemental sulfur (S_{8}), and polysulfides (S^{2−}_{n}). Other than sulfate reduction, some sulfate-reducing microorganisms are also capable of other reactions like disproportionation of sulfur compounds. Depending on the context, "sulfate-reducing microorganisms" can be used in a broader sense (including all species that can reduce any of these sulfur compounds) or in a narrower sense (including only species that reduce sulfate, and excluding strict thiosulfate and sulfur reducers, for example).

Sulfate-reducing microorganisms can be traced back to 3.5 billion years ago and are considered to be among the oldest forms of microbes, having contributed to the sulfur cycle soon after life emerged on Earth.

Many organisms reduce small amounts of sulfates in order to synthesize sulfur-containing cell components; this is known as assimilatory sulfate reduction. By contrast, the sulfate-reducing microorganisms considered here reduce sulfate in large amounts to obtain energy and expel the resulting sulfide as waste; this is known as dissimilatory sulfate reduction. They use sulfate as the terminal electron acceptor of their electron transport chain. Most of them are anaerobes; however, there are examples of sulfate-reducing microorganisms that are tolerant of oxygen, and some of them can even perform aerobic respiration. No growth is observed when oxygen is used as the electron acceptor. In addition, there are sulfate-reducing microorganisms that can also reduce other electron acceptors, such as fumarate, nitrate (NO^{−}_{3}), nitrite (NO^{−}_{2}), ferric iron (Fe^{3+}), and dimethyl sulfoxide (DMSO).

In terms of electron donor, this group contains both organotrophs and lithotrophs. The organotrophs oxidize organic compounds, such as carbohydrates, organic acids (such as formate, lactate, acetate, propionate, and butyrate), alcohols (methanol and ethanol), aliphatic hydrocarbons (including methane), and aromatic hydrocarbons (benzene, toluene, ethylbenzene, and xylene). The lithotrophs oxidize molecular hydrogen (H_{2}), for which they compete with methanogens and acetogens in anaerobic conditions. Some sulfate-reducing microorganisms can directly use metallic iron (Fe^{0}, also known as zerovalent iron, or ZVI) as an electron donor, oxidizing it to ferrous iron (Fe^{2+}).

== Ecological importance and markers ==
Sulfate occurs widely in seawater, sediment, and water rich in decaying organic material. Sulfate is also found in more extreme environments such as hydrothermal vents, acid mine drainage sites, oil fields, and the deep subsurface, including the world's oldest isolated ground water. Sulfate-reducing microorganisms are common in anaerobic environments where they aid in the degradation of organic materials. In these anaerobic environments, fermenting bacteria extract energy from large organic molecules; the resulting smaller compounds such as organic acids and alcohols are further oxidized by acetogens and methanogens and the competing sulfate-reducing microorganisms.

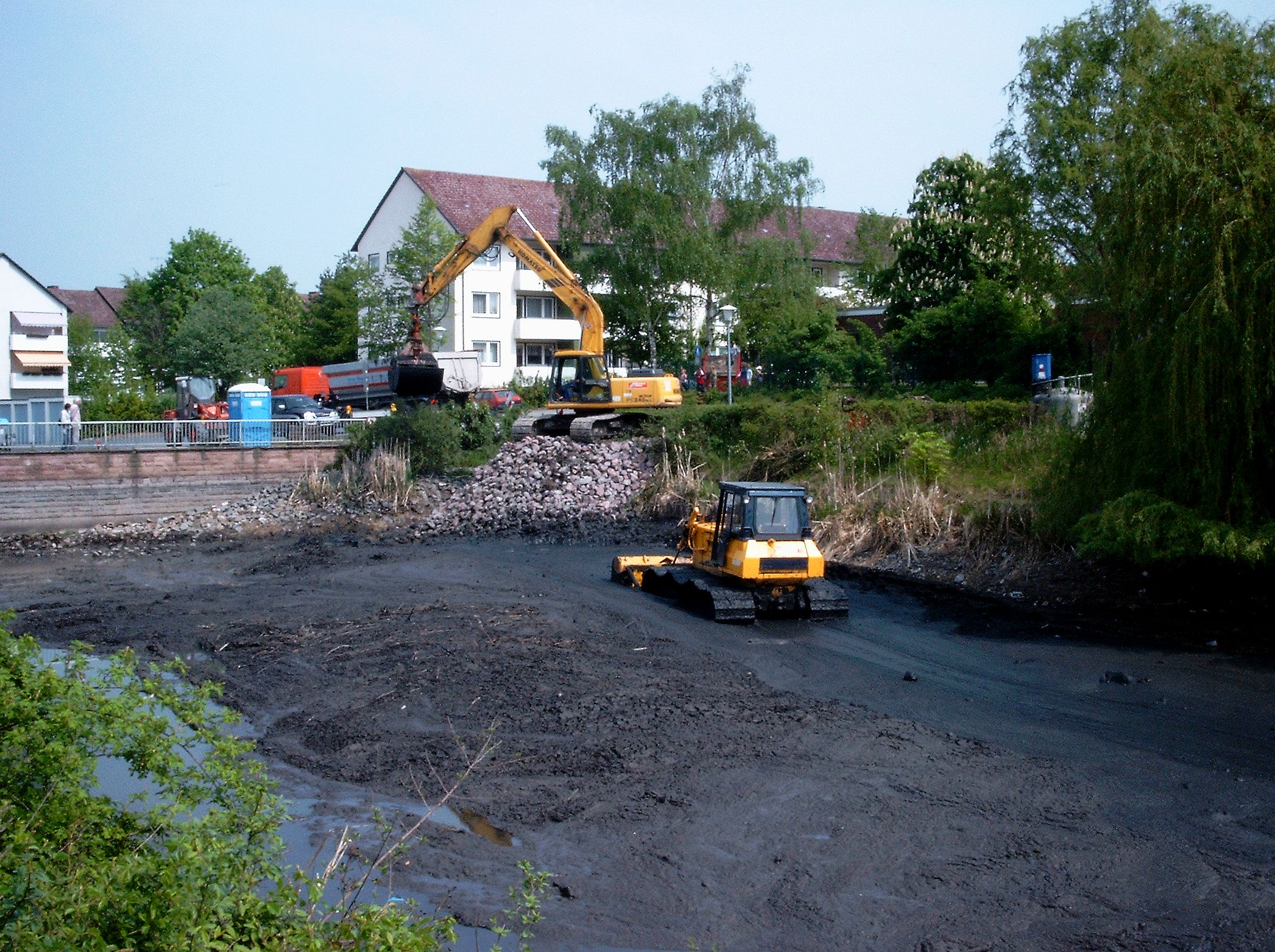
Sludge from a pond; the black color is due to metal sulfides that result from the action of sulfate-reducing microorganisms.

The toxic hydrogen sulfide is a waste product of sulfate-reducing microorganisms; its rotten egg odor is often a marker for the presence of sulfate-reducing microorganisms in nature. Sulfate-reducing microorganisms are responsible for the sulfurous odors of salt marshes and mud flats. Much of the hydrogen sulfide will react with metal ions in the water to produce metal sulfides. These metal sulfides, such as ferrous sulfide (FeS), are insoluble and often black or brown, leading to the dark color of sludge.

During the Permian–Triassic extinction event (250 million years ago) a severe anoxic event seems to have occurred where these forms of bacteria became the dominant force in oceanic ecosystems, producing copious amounts of hydrogen sulfide.

Sulfate-reducing bacteria also generate neurotoxic methylmercury as a byproduct of their metabolism, through methylation of inorganic mercury present in their surroundings. They are known to be the dominant source of this bioaccumulative form of mercury in aquatic systems.

== Uses ==
Some sulfate-reducing microorganisms can reduce hydrocarbons, and they have been used to clean up contaminated soils. Their use has also been proposed for other kinds of contaminations.

Sulfate-reducing microorganisms are considered a possible way to deal with acid mine waters that are produced by other microorganisms.

== Problems caused by sulfate-reducing microorganisms ==
In engineering, sulfate-reducing microorganisms can create problems when metal structures are exposed to sulfate-containing water: Interaction of water and metal creates a layer of molecular hydrogen on the metal surface; sulfate-reducing microorganisms then oxidize the hydrogen while creating hydrogen sulfide, which contributes to corrosion.

Hydrogen sulfide from sulfate-reducing microorganisms also plays a role in the biogenic sulfide corrosion of concrete. It also occurs in sour crude oil.

Some sulfate-reducing microorganisms play a role in the anaerobic oxidation of methane:

CH_{4} + SO_{4}^{2-} → HCO_{3}^{−} + HS^{−} + H_{2}O

An important fraction of the methane formed by methanogens below the seabed is oxidized by sulfate-reducing microorganisms in the transition zone separating the methanogenesis from the sulfate reduction activity in the sediments. This process is also considered a major sink for sulfate in marine sediments.

In hydraulic fracturing, fluids are used to frack shale formations to recover methane (shale gas) and hydrocarbons. Biocide compounds are often added to water to inhibit the microbial activity of sulfate-reducing microorganisms, in order to but not limited to, avoid anaerobic methane oxidation and the generation of hydrogen sulfide, ultimately resulting in minimizing potential production loss.

== Biochemistry ==
Before sulfate can be used as an electron acceptor, it must be activated. This is done by the enzyme ATP-sulfurylase, which uses ATP and sulfate to create adenosine 5′-phosphosulfate (APS). APS is subsequently reduced to sulfite and AMP. Sulfite is then further reduced to sulfide, while AMP is turned into ADP using another molecule of ATP. The overall process, thus, involves an investment of two molecules of the energy carrier ATP, which must to be regained from the reduction.

Overview of the three key enzymatic steps of the dissimilatory sulfate reduction pathway. Enzymes: sat and atps respectively stand for sulfate adenylyltransferase and ATP sulfurylase (EC 2.7.7.4); apr and aps are both used to adenosine-5'-phosphosulfate reductase (EC 1.8.4.8); and dsr is the dissimilatory (bi)sulfite reductase (EC 1.8.99.5);

The enzyme dissimilatory (bi)sulfite reductase, dsrAB (EC 1.8.99.5), that catalyzes the last step of dissimilatory sulfate reduction, is the functional gene most used as a molecular marker to detect the presence of sulfate-reducing microorganisms.

== Phylogeny ==
The sulfate-reducing microorganisms have been treated as a phenotypic group, together with the other sulfur-reducing bacteria, for identification purposes. They are found in several different phylogenetic lines. As of 2009, 60 genera containing 220 species of sulfate-reducing bacteria are known.

Among the Thermodesulfobacteriota the orders of sulfate-reducing bacteria include Desulfobacterales, Desulfovibrionales, and Syntrophobacterales. This accounts for the largest group of sulfate-reducing bacteria, about 23 genera.

The second largest group of sulfate-reducing bacteria is found among the Bacillota, including the genera Desulfotomaculum, Desulfosporomusa, and Desulfosporosinus.

In the Nitrospirota phylum we find sulfate-reducing Thermodesulfovibrio species.

Two more groups that include thermophilic sulfate-reducing bacteria are given their own phyla, the Thermodesulfobacteriota and Thermodesulfobium.

There are also three known genera of sulfate-reducing archaea: Archaeoglobus, Thermocladium and Caldivirga. They are found in hydrothermal vents, oil deposits, and hot springs.

In July 2019, a scientific study of Kidd Mine in Canada discovered sulfate-reducing microorganisms living 7,900 feet (2,400 m) below the surface. The sulfate reducers discovered in Kidd Mine are lithotrophs, obtaining their energy by oxidizing minerals such as pyrite rather than organic compounds. Kidd Mine is also the site of the oldest known water on Earth.

== See also ==
- Anaerobic respiration
- Deep biosphere
- Extremophile
- Microbial metabolism
- Microorganism
- Quinone-interacting membrane-bound oxidoreductase
- Sulfur cycle
