= Desulfovibrio =

Scientific classification
- Domain: Bacteria
- Kingdom: Pseudomonadati
- Phylum: Thermodesulfobacteriota
- Class: Desulfovibrionia
- Order: Desulfovibrionales
- Family: Desulfovibrionaceae
- Genus: Desulfovibrio; Kluyver & van Niel 1936

Type species
- Desulfovibrio desulfuricans (Beijerinck 1895) Kluyver & van Niel 1936

Species
- See text

Synonyms
- Desulfomonas Moore, Johnson & Holdeman 1976; "Sporovibrio" Starkey 1938

Genus of bacteria

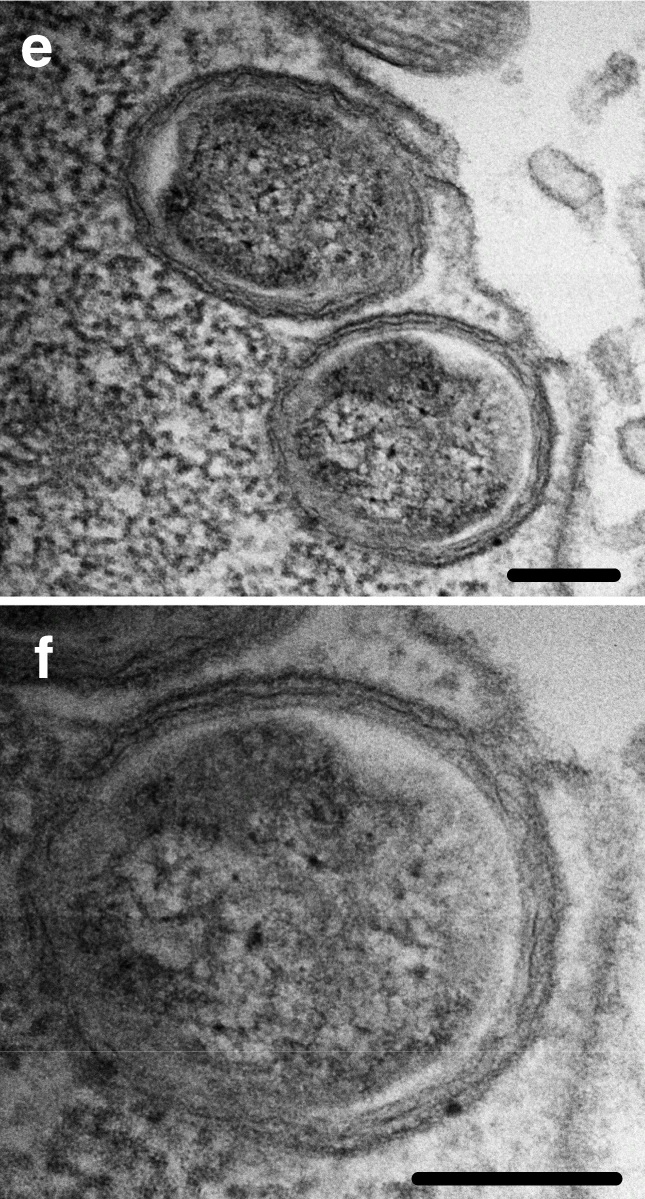

Desulfovibrio is a genus of Gram-negative sulfate-reducing bacteria. Desulfovibrio species are commonly found in aquatic environments with high levels of organic material, as well as in water-logged soils, and form major community members of extreme oligotrophic habitats such as deep granitic fractured rock aquifers. They're also found in the guts of beetles, such as Melolontha melolontha, where they perform sulfate reduction.

High amounts of Desulfovibrio bacteria have been associated with inflammatory bowel disease, bacteremia infections, and Parkinson's disease.

Some Desulfovibrio species have in recent years been shown to have bioremediation potential for toxic radionuclides such as uranium by a reductive bioaccumulation process, such as converting highly water-soluble U(VI) to relatively insoluble U(IV) precipitate, thus removing the toxic uranium from contaminated water.

== Phylogeny ==
The currently accepted taxonomy is based on the List of Prokaryotic names with Standing in Nomenclature (LPSN) and National Center for Biotechnology Information (NCBI).

16S rRNA based LTP_10_2024

- Desulfovibrio
  - D. piger
  - - - D. legallii
      - D. porci
    - - D. desulfuricans
      - - D. intestinalis
        - D. simplex Zellner et al. 1990

120 marker proteins based GTDB 10-RS226

- Desulfovibrio
  - - "Ca. D. faecigallinarum" Gilroy et al. 2021
    - "Ca. D. intestinipullorum" Gilroy et al. 2021
  - - - D. piger (Moore et al. 1976) Loubinoux et al. 2002
      - - "Ca. D. intestinigallinarum" Gilroy et al. 2021
        - - "Ca. D. gallistercoris" Gilroy et al. 2021
          - "Ca. D. intestinavium" Gilroy et al. 2021
    - - - "Ca. D. kirbyi" Takeuchi et al. 2020
        - "Ca. D. trichonymphae" Sato et al. 2009
      - - - "D. fairfieldensis" McDougall et al. 1997
          - D. porci Wylensek et al. 2021
        - - D. legallii corrig. Thabet et al. 2013
          - - D. desulfuricans (Beijerinck 1895) Kluyver & van Niel 1936
            - D. intestinalis Frohlich et al. 1999

Unassigned species:

- D. aminophilus Baena et al. 1999
- D. biadhensis Fadhlaoui et al. 2015
- D. bizertensis Haouari et al. 2006 [Paradesulfovibrio bizertensis (Haouari et al. 2006) Waite et al. 2020]
- "D. caledoniensis" Tardy-Jacquenod et al. 1996
- D. capillatus Miranda-Tello et al. 2013
- "D. cavernae" Sass & Cypionka 2004
- "D. diazotrophicus" corrig. Sayavedra et al. 2021
- D. gracilis Magot et al. 2004 [Paucidesulfovibrio gracilis (Magot et al. 2004) Waite et al. 2020]
- D. giganteus corrig. Esnault, Caumette & Garcia 1988
- D. falkowii Hamaguchi et al. 2025
- "D. ferrophilus" Dinh et al. 2004
- "D. halohydrocarbonoclasticus" Zobell 1947
- "D. hontreensis" Tarasov et al. 2015
- D. litoralis Sass et al. 1998
- "D. multispirans" Czechowski et al. 1984
- "D. oliviopondense" Qatabi Sr. 2007
- "D. oryzae" Ouattara et al. 2000b
- D. profundus Bale et al. 1997
- "D. rubentschikii" (Baars 1930) ZoBell 1948
- "D. singaporenus" Sheng et al. 2007

== See also ==
- List of bacterial orders
- List of bacteria genera
