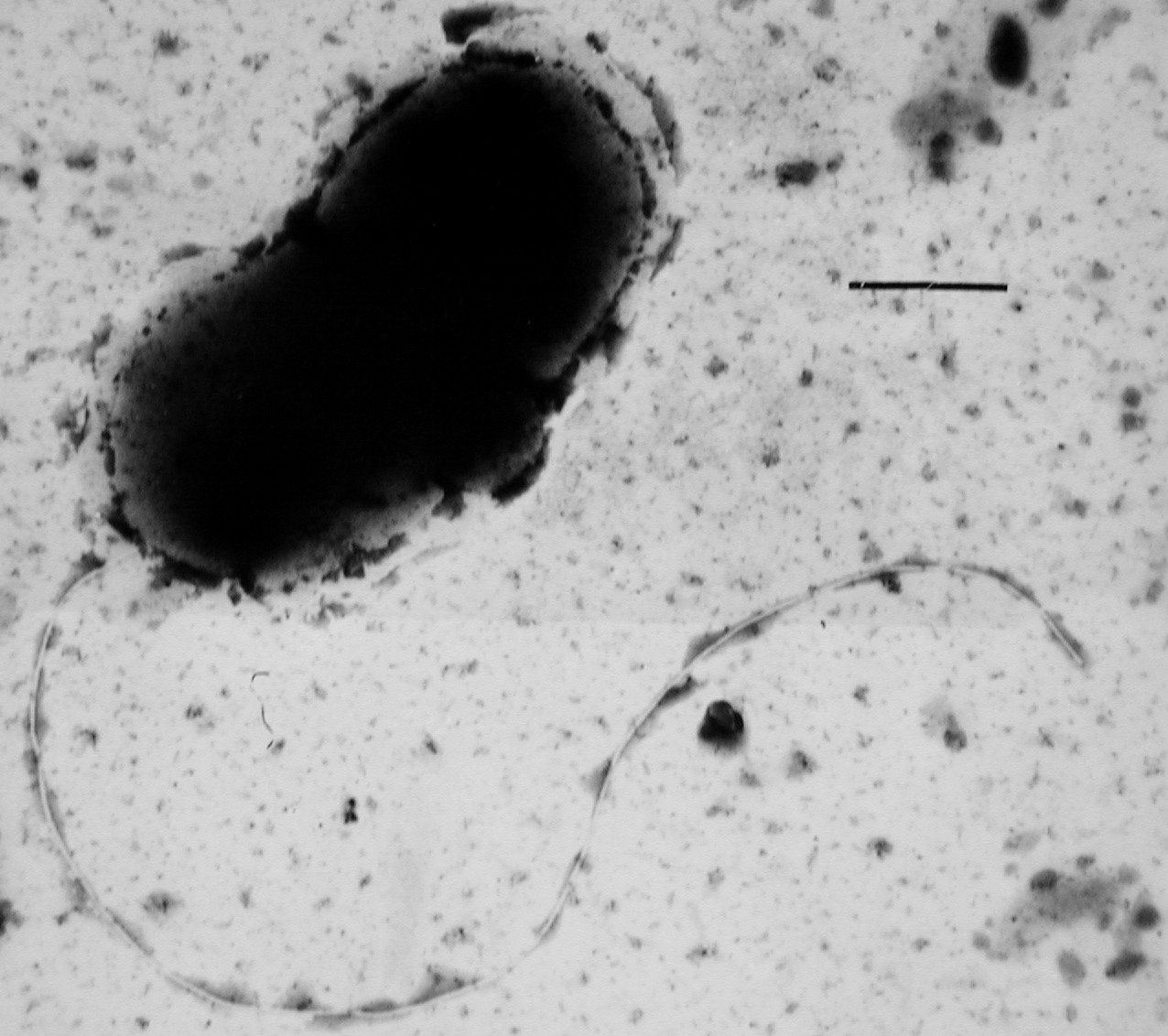
- Nitratidesulfovibrio vulgaris

Scientific classification
- Domain: Bacteria
- Kingdom: Pseudomonadati
- Phylum: Thermodesulfobacteriota
- Class: Desulfovibrionia
- Order: Desulfovibrionales
- Family: Desulfovibrionaceae; Kuever et al. 2006

Genera
- See text

Synonyms
- "Sporovibrionaceae" Prévot 1940

= Desulfovibrionaceae =

Family of bacteria

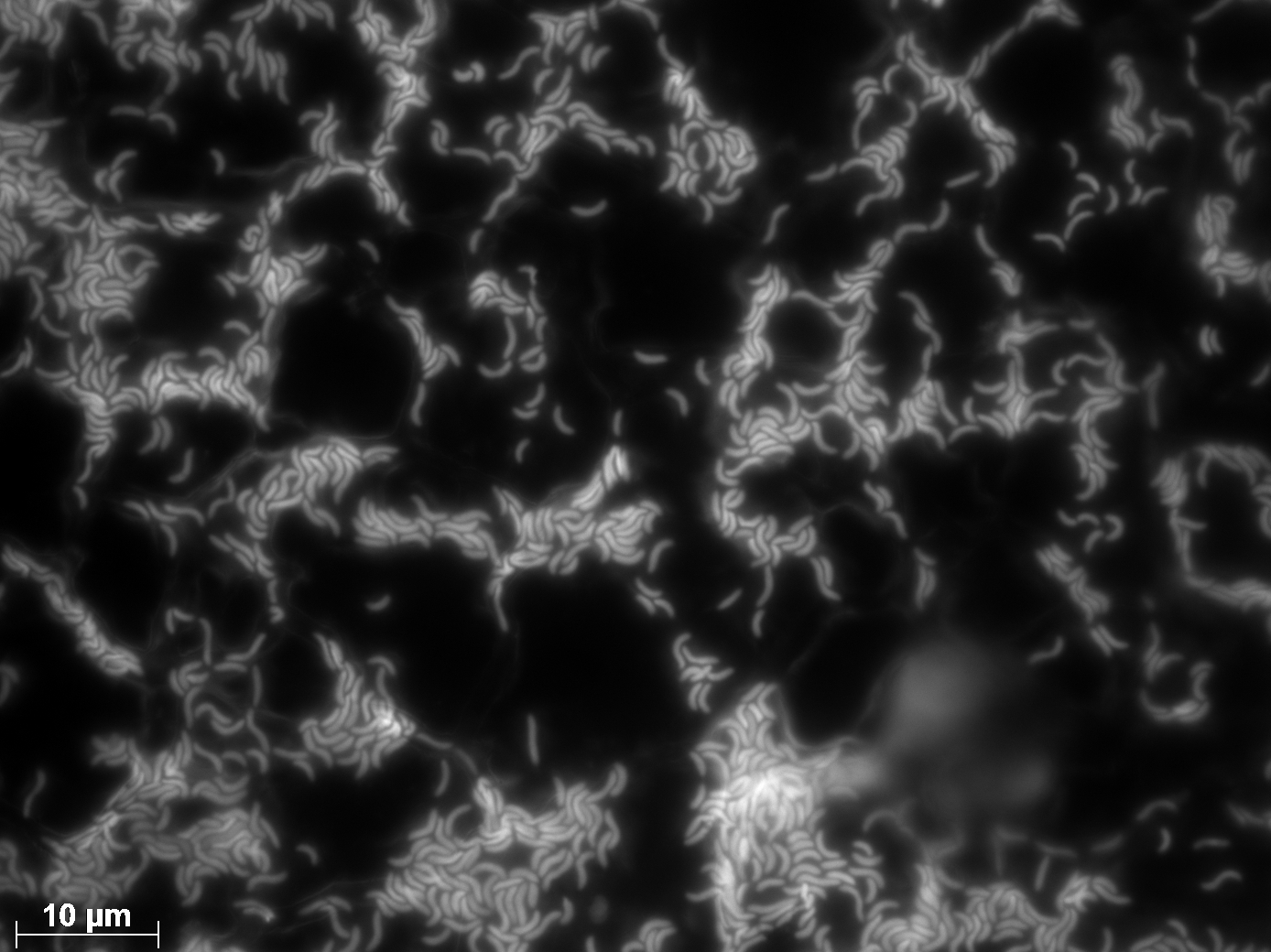
Oleidesulfovibrio alaskensis cells on stainless steel.

Desulfovibrionaceae is a family of bacteria belonging to the phylum Thermodesulfobacteriota.

== Phylogeny ==
The currently accepted taxonomy is based on the List of Prokaryotic names with Standing in Nomenclature (LPSN) and National Center for Biotechnology Information (NCBI).

16S rRNA based LTP_10_2024

- - - Desulfovibrionaceae
      - - Oleidesulfovibrio
        - - "Psychrodesulfovibrio" Galushko & Kuever 2020
          - Halodesulfovibrio
      - - "Frigididesulfovibrio"
        - - - Nitratidesulfovibrio
            - - Desulfovibrio longreachensis
              - Cupidesulfovibrio
          - - - Lawsonia
              - Bilophila
            - Desulfovibrio
  - - Desulfonatronaceae
      Desulfonatronum
    - Desulfovibrionaceae 2
      - - Alteridesulfovibrio
        - - Fundidesulfovibrio
          - - Desulfolutivibrio
            - Solidesulfovibrio
      - - - - Alkalidesulfovibrio
            - Desulfocurvibacter
          - - Desulfohalovibrio
            - - Desulfocurvus
              - Desulfobaculum [incl. Paradesulfovibrio]
        - - - Megalodesulfovibrio
            - - Desulfovibrio species-group 2
              - Oceanidesulfovibrio
          - - - "Aminidesulfovibrio"
              - Humidesulfovibrio
            - - Paucidesulfovibrio
              - - Maridesulfovibrio
                - Pseudodesulfovibrio [incl. "Salidesulfovibrio" Park et al. 2022]

120 marker proteins based GTDB 10-RS226

- - Desulfonatronaceae
    Desulfonatronum Pikuta et al. 1998
  - Desulfovibrionaceae
    - - - Fundidesulfovibrio Waite et al. 2020
        - - "Alteridesulfovibrio" Waite et al. 2020
          - - Desulfolutivibrio Thiel et al. 2021
            - Solidesulfovibrio Waite et al. 2020
      - - - - "Desulfovibrio ferrophilus" Dinh et al. 2004
            - Desulfocurvus Klouche et al. 2009
          - - Desulfobaculum corrig. Zhao et al. 2012
            - Paradesulfovibrio Waite et al. 2020
        - - - Desulfocurvibacter Spring et al. 2019
            - - Alkalidesulfovibrio Park et al. 2023
              - Desulfohalovibrio Spring et al. 2019
          - - - "Aminidesulfovibrio" Waite et al. 2020
              - Humidesulfovibrio Waite et al. 2020
            - - Paucidesulfovibrio Waite et al. 2020
              - - Maridesulfovibrio Waite et al. 2020
                - Pseudodesulfovibrio Cao et al. 2016 (incl. "Salidesulfovibrio")
    - - - Megalodesulfovibrio Waite et al. 2021
        - Oceanidesulfovibrio Galushko & Kuever 2021
      - - - Oleidesulfovibrio Waite et al. 2020
          - Halodesulfovibrio Shivani et al. 2017 [incl. "Psychrodesulfovibrio"]
        - - "Frigididesulfovibrio" Waite et al. 2020
          - - - Nitratidesulfovibrio Waite et al. 2020
              - Cupidesulfovibrio Wan et al. 2021
            - - - - "Taurinivorans" Ye et al. 2023
                  - "Mailhella" Ndongo et al. 2017
                - - "Ca. Avidesulfovibrio" Gilroy et al. 2021
                  - Bilophila Baron et al. 1990 [incl. Lawsonia McOrist et al. 1995]
              - Desulfovibrio Kluyver & van Niel 1936
