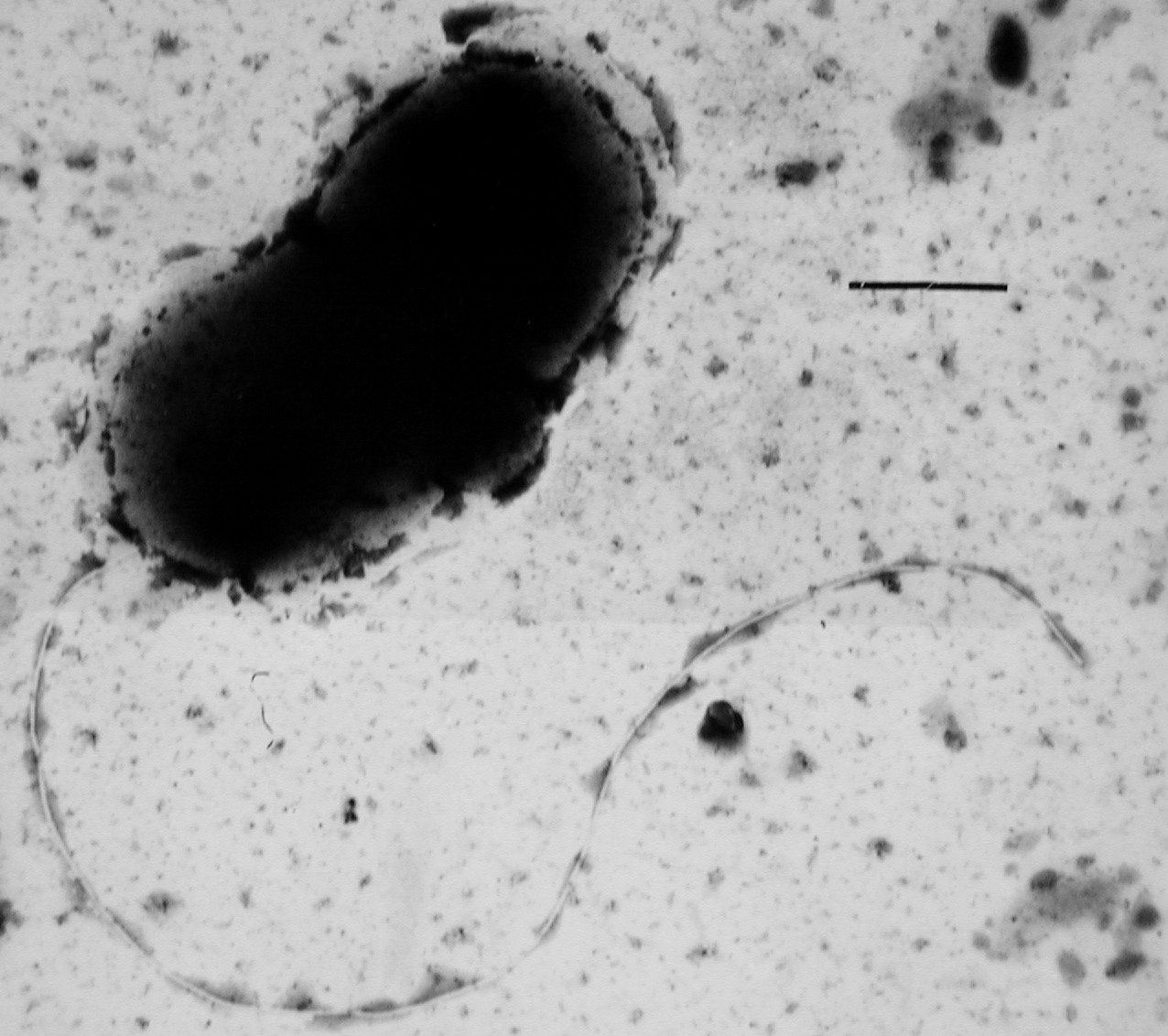
- Nitratidesulfovibrio vulgaris

Scientific classification
- Domain: Bacteria
- Kingdom: Pseudomonadati
- Phylum: Thermodesulfobacteriota
- Class: Desulfovibrionia; Waite et al. 2020
- Order: Desulfovibrionales; Waite et al. 2020

Families
- Desulfohalobiaceae; Desulfomicrobiaceae; Desulfonatronaceae; Desulfonatronovibrionaceae; Desulfonauticaceae; Desulfoplanetaceae; Desulfovibrionaceae; Desulfothermaceae

Synonyms
- "Sporovibrionales" Prévot 1940

= Desulfovibrionales =

Order of bacteria

Desulfovibrionales are a taxonomic order of bacteria belonging to the phylum Thermodesulfobacteriota, with four families. They are Gram-negative. The majority are sulfate-reducing, with the exception of Lawsonia and Bilophila. All members of this order are obligately anaerobic. Most species are mesophilic, but some are moderate thermophiles.

== Phylogeny ==
The currently accepted taxonomy is based on the List of Prokaryotic names with Standing in Nomenclature (LPSN) and National Center for Biotechnology Information (NCBI).

16S rRNA based LTP_10_2024

- - - Desulfohalobiaceae Kuever, Rainey & Widdel 2006
    - - - Desulfovulcanus Kashyap et al. 2023
        - Desulfonauticaceae Waite et al. 2020
      - - Desulfonauticaceae Waite et al. 2020
        - Desulfonatronovibrionaceae Waite et al. 2020
  - - - Desulfoplanetaceae corrig. Waite et al. 2020
      - Desulfomicrobiaceae Kuever, Rainey & Widdel 2006
    - - Desulfovibrionaceae Kuever, Rainey & Widdel 2006
      - - Desulfonatronaceae corrig. Kuever, Rainey & Widdel 2006
        - Desulfovibrionaceae species-group 2

120 marker proteins based GTDB 10-RS226

- "Desulfovibrionota" Desulfovibrionia
  - Desulfovibrionales
    - - - Desulfohalobiaceae
        - Desulfothermaceae
      - - - Desulfoplanetaceae
          - Desulfomicrobiaceae
        - - Desulfonauticaceae
          - Desulfonatronovibrionaceae
    - - Desulfonatronaceae
      - Desulfovibrionaceae

== See also ==
- List of bacterial orders
- List of bacteria genera
