= Amine sulfotransferase =

Class of enzymes

amine sulfotransferase

Identifiers
- EC no.: 2.8.2.3
- CAS no.: 9026-08-8

Databases
- BRENDA: enzyme data
- ExPASy: NiceZyme view
- KEGG: enzyme entry
- MetaCyc: metabolic pathway
- Rhea: reactions
- PDB structures: RCSB PDB PDBe PDBsum
- Gene Ontology: AmiGO / QuickGO
Search
- PMC: articles
- PubMed: articles
- NCBI: proteins

In enzymology, an amine sulfotransferase (EC 2.8.2.3) is an enzyme that catalyzes the chemical reaction

3'-phosphoadenylyl sulfate + an amine $\rightleftharpoons$ adenosine 3',5'-bisphosphate + a sulfamate

Thus, the two substrates of this enzyme are 3'-phosphoadenylyl sulfate and amine, whereas its two products are adenosine 3',5'-bisphosphate and sulfamate.

This enzyme belongs to the family of transferases, specifically the sulfotransferases, which transfer sulfur-containing groups. The systematic name of this enzyme class is 3'-phosphoadenylyl-sulfate:amine N-sulfotransferase. Other names in common use include arylamine sulfotransferase, and amine N-sulfotransferase. This enzyme participates in sulfur metabolism.
