= Scymnol sulfotransferase =

Class of enzymes

Identifiers
- EC no.: 2.8.2.32

Databases
- BRENDA: enzyme data
- ExPASy: NiceZyme view
- KEGG: enzyme entry
- MetaCyc: metabolic pathway
- Rhea: reactions
- PDB structures: RCSB PDB PDBe PDBsum
Search
- PMC: articles
- PubMed: articles
- NCBI: proteins

Scymnol sulfotransferase (EC 2.8.2.32) is an enzyme that catalyzes the chemical reaction

scymnol
+ PAPS
5β-scymnol sulfate
+ adenosine 3',5'-
bisphosphate

The enzyme characterised from the Port Jackson shark uses the cofactor 3'-phosphoadenosine-5'-phosphosulfate (PAPS) to convert the bile salt, scymnol, to its sulfate derivative, giving adenosine 3',5'-bisphosphate as a byproduct. The enzyme has also been found in Australian ray species.

This enzyme is a transferase, specifically a sulfotransferases, which transfer sulfur-containing groups. The systematic name of this enzyme class is 3'-Phosphoadenosine-5'-phosphosulfate:5beta-scymnol sulfotransferase.
