= UDP-N-acetylgalactosamine-4-sulfate sulfotransferase =

Class of enzymes

Identifiers
- EC no.: 2.8.2.7
- CAS no.: 37278-32-3

Databases
- IntEnz: IntEnz view
- BRENDA: BRENDA entry
- ExPASy: NiceZyme view
- KEGG: KEGG entry
- MetaCyc: metabolic pathway
- PRIAM: profile
- PDB structures: RCSB PDB PDBe PDBsum
- Gene Ontology: AmiGO / QuickGO
Search
- PMC: articles
- PubMed: articles
- NCBI: proteins

In enzymology, an UDP-N-acetylgalactosamine-4-sulfate sulfotransferase (EC 2.8.2.7) is an enzyme that catalyzes the chemical reaction

3'-phosphoadenylyl sulfate + UDP-N-acetyl-D-galactosamine 4-sulfate $\rightleftharpoons$ adenosine 3',5'-bisphosphate + UDP-N-acetyl-D-galactosamine 4,6-bissulfate

Thus, the two substrates of this enzyme are 3'-phosphoadenylyl sulfate and UDP-N-acetyl-D-galactosamine 4-sulfate, whereas its two products are adenosine 3',5'-bisphosphate and UDP-N-acetyl-D-galactosamine 4,6-bissulfate.

This enzyme belongs to the family of transferases, specifically the sulfotransferases, which transfer sulfur-containing groups. The systematic name of this enzyme class is 3'-phosphoadenylyl-sulfate:UDP-N-acetyl-D-galactosamine-4-sulfate 6-sulfotransferase. Other names in common use include uridine diphosphoacetylgalactosamine 4-sulfate sulfotransferase, uridine diphospho-N-acetylgalactosamine 4-sulfate sulfotransferase, and uridine diphosphoacetylgalactosamine 4-sulfate sulfotransferase.
