= Petromyzonol sulfotransferase =

Class of enzymes

Identifiers
- EC no.: 2.8.2.31

Databases
- IntEnz: IntEnz view
- BRENDA: BRENDA entry
- ExPASy: NiceZyme view
- KEGG: KEGG entry
- MetaCyc: metabolic pathway
- PRIAM: profile
- PDB structures: RCSB PDB PDBe PDBsum
Search
- PMC: articles
- PubMed: articles
- NCBI: proteins

In enzymology, a petromyzonol sulfotransferase (EC 2.8.2.31) is an enzyme that catalyzes the chemical reaction

3'-phosphoadenylyl sulfate + 5alpha-cholan-3alpha,7alpha,12alpha,24-tetrol $\rightleftharpoons$ adenosine 3',5'-bisphosphate + 5alpha-cholan-3alpha,7alpha,12alpha-triol 24-sulfate

Thus, the two substrates of this enzyme are 3'-phosphoadenylyl sulfate and 5alpha-cholan-3alpha,7alpha,12alpha,24-tetrol, whereas its two products are adenosine 3',5'-bisphosphate and 5alpha-cholan-3alpha,7alpha,12alpha-triol 24-sulfate.

This enzyme belongs to the family of transferases, specifically the sulfotransferases, which transfer sulfur-containing groups. The systematic name of this enzyme class is 3'-phosphoadenylyl-sulfate:5alpha-cholan-3alpha,7alpha,12alpha,24-te trol sulfotransferase. This enzyme is also called PZ-SULT.
