= Cortisol sulfotransferase =

Class of enzymes

Identifiers
- EC no.: 2.8.2.18
- CAS no.: 71427-08-2

Databases
- BRENDA: enzyme data
- ExPASy: NiceZyme view
- KEGG: enzyme entry
- MetaCyc: metabolic pathway
- Rhea: reactions
- PDB structures: RCSB PDB PDBe PDBsum
- Gene Ontology: AmiGO / QuickGO
Search
- PMC: articles
- PubMed: articles
- NCBI: proteins

Cortisol sulfotransferase (EC 2.8.2.18) is an enzyme that catalyzes the chemical reaction

cortisol
+ PAPS
cortisol 21-sulfate
+ adenosine
3',5'-bisphosphate

The reaction converts the steroid hormone, cortisol, to its sulfate derivative by transferring a sulfate group from the cofactor 3'-phosphoadenosine-5'-phosphosulfate (PAPS) and giving adenosine 3',5'-bisphosphate as a byproduct. The enzyme was characterised from liver.

This enzyme is a transferase, specifically a sulfotransferase, which transfer sulfur-containing groups. The systematic name of this enzyme class is 3'-phosphoadenylyl-sulfate:cortisol 21-sulfotransferase. Other names in common use include glucocorticosteroid sulfotransferase, and glucocorticoid sulfotransferase.
