= Phosphoadenylyl-sulfate reductase (thioredoxin) =

phosphoadenylyl-sulfate reductase (thioredoxin)

Identifiers
- EC no.: 1.8.4.8
- CAS no.: 9068-63-7

Databases
- IntEnz: IntEnz view
- BRENDA: BRENDA entry
- ExPASy: NiceZyme view
- KEGG: KEGG entry
- MetaCyc: metabolic pathway
- PRIAM: profile
- PDB structures: RCSB PDB PDBe PDBsum
- Gene Ontology: AmiGO / QuickGO
Search
- PMC: articles
- PubMed: articles
- NCBI: proteins

In enzymology, a phosphoadenylyl-sulfate reductase (thioredoxin) (EC 1.8.4.8) is an enzyme that catalyzes the chemical reaction

adenosine 3',5'-bisphosphate + sulfite + thioredoxin disulfide $\rightleftharpoons$ 3'-phosphoadenylyl sulfate + thioredoxin

The 3 substrates of this enzyme are adenosine 3',5'-bisphosphate, sulfite, and thioredoxin disulfide, whereas its two products are 3'-phosphoadenylyl sulfate and thioredoxin.

This enzyme belongs to the family of oxidoreductases, specifically those acting on a sulfur group of donors with a disulfide as acceptor. The systematic name of this enzyme class is adenosine 3',5'-bisphosphate,sulfite:thioredoxin-disulfide oxidoreductase (3'-phosphoadenosine-5'-phosphosulfate-forming). Other names in common use include PAPS reductase, thioredoxin-dependent, PAPS reductase, thioredoxin:adenosine 3'-phosphate 5'-phosphosulfate reductase, 3'-phosphoadenylylsulfate reductase, thioredoxin:3'-phospho-adenylylsulfate reductase, phosphoadenosine-phosphosulfate reductase, adenosine 3',5'-bisphosphate,sulfite:oxidized-thioredoxin, and oxidoreductase (3'-phosphoadenosine-5'-phosphosulfate-forming). This enzyme participates in sulfur metabolism.

== Structural studies ==
As of late 2007, 3 structures have been solved for this class of enzymes, with PDB accession codes 1ILO, 1WMJ, and 2O8V.
