= Choline sulfotransferase =

Class of enzymes

Identifiers
- EC no.: 2.8.2.6
- CAS no.: 9047-23-8

Databases
- IntEnz: IntEnz view
- BRENDA: BRENDA entry
- ExPASy: NiceZyme view
- KEGG: KEGG entry
- MetaCyc: metabolic pathway
- PRIAM: profile
- PDB structures: RCSB PDB PDBe PDBsum
- Gene Ontology: AmiGO / QuickGO
Search
- PMC: articles
- PubMed: articles
- NCBI: proteins

Choline sulfotransferase (EC 2.8.2.6) is an enzyme that catalyzes the chemical reaction

choline
+
PAPS
choline sulfate
+
adenosine 3',5'-bisphosphate

The reaction converts choline to choline sulfate by transferring a sulfate group from the cofactor 3'-phosphoadenosine-5'-phosphosulfate (PAPS) and giving adenosine 3',5'-bisphosphate as a byproduct. The product is an osmolyte accumulated under saline conditions in organisms including Limonium species.

This enzyme belongs to the family of transferases, specifically the sulfotransferases, which transfer sulfur-containing groups. The systematic name of this enzyme class is 3'-phosphoadenylyl-sulfate:choline sulfotransferase. This enzyme is also called choline sulphokinase.
