= Phosphoadenylylsulfatase =

Class of enzymes

Identifiers
- EC no.: 3.6.2.2
- CAS no.: 37289-37-5

Databases
- BRENDA: enzyme data
- ExPASy: NiceZyme view
- KEGG: enzyme entry
- MetaCyc: metabolic pathway
- Rhea: reactions
- PDB structures: RCSB PDB PDBe PDBsum
- Gene Ontology: AmiGO / QuickGO
Search
- PMC: articles
- PubMed: articles
- NCBI: proteins

Phosphoadenylylsulfatase (EC 3.6.2.2) is an enzyme characterised from sheep brain that catalyzes the hydrolysis of 3'-phosphoadenosine-5'-phosphosulfate to adenosine 3',5'-bisphosphate and sulfate:

3'-phosphoadenosine-5'-phosphosulfate
H_{2}O
H_{2}SO_{4}
adenosine 3',5'-bisphosphate

The reaction is part of sulfur metabolism in plants.

This enzyme is a hydrolase, specifically one acting on acid anhydrides in sulfonyl-containing anhydrides. It uses manganese (Mn^{2+}) as a cofactor.

== Nomenclature ==
The systematic name of this enzyme class is 3'-phosphoadenylyl-sulfate sulfohydrolase. Other names in common use include:

- 3-phosphoadenylyl sulfatase,
- 3-phosphoadenosine 5-phosphosulfate sulfatase,
- PAPS sulfatase, and
- 3'-phosphoadenylylsulfate sulfohydrolase.
