= Triglucosylalkylacylglycerol sulfotransferase =

Class of enzymes

triglucosylalkylacylglycerol sulfotransferase

Identifiers
- EC no.: 2.8.2.19
- CAS no.: 83589-05-3

Databases
- IntEnz: IntEnz view
- BRENDA: BRENDA entry
- ExPASy: NiceZyme view
- KEGG: KEGG entry
- MetaCyc: metabolic pathway
- PRIAM: profile
- PDB structures: RCSB PDB PDBe PDBsum
- Gene Ontology: AmiGO / QuickGO
Search
- PMC: articles
- PubMed: articles
- NCBI: proteins

In enzymology, a triglucosylalkylacylglycerol sulfotransferase (EC 2.8.2.19) is an enzyme that catalyzes the chemical reaction

3'-phosphoadenylyl sulfate + α-D-glucosyl-(1→6)-alpha-D-glucosyl-(1→6)-α-D-glucosyl-(1→3)-1-O-alkyl-2-O-acylglycerol $\rightleftharpoons$ adenosine 3',5'-bisphosphate + 6-sulfo-α-D-glucosyl-(1→6)-α-D-glucosyl-(1→6)-α-D-glucosyl-(1→3)-1-O-alkyl-2-O-acylglycerol

This enzyme belongs to the family of transferases, specifically the sulfotransferases, which transfer sulfur-containing groups. The systematic name of this enzyme class is 3'-phosphoadenylyl-sulfate:triglucosyl-1-O-alkyl-2-O-acylglycerol 6-sulfotransferase. This enzyme is also called triglucosylmonoalkylmonoacyl sulfotransferase.
