= Chondroitin 6-sulfotransferase =

Enzyme family

chondroitin 6-sulfotransferase

Identifiers
- EC no.: 2.8.2.17
- CAS no.: 83589-04-2

Databases
- IntEnz: IntEnz view
- BRENDA: BRENDA entry
- ExPASy: NiceZyme view
- KEGG: KEGG entry
- MetaCyc: metabolic pathway
- PRIAM: profile
- PDB structures: RCSB PDB PDBe PDBsum
- Gene Ontology: AmiGO / QuickGO
Search
- PMC: articles
- PubMed: articles
- NCBI: proteins

In enzymology, a chondroitin 6-sulfotransferase (EC 2.8.2.17) is an enzyme that catalyzes the chemical reaction

3'-phosphoadenylyl sulfate + chondroitin $\rightleftharpoons$ adenosine 3',5'-bisphosphate + chondroitin 6'-sulfate

Thus, the two substrates of this enzyme are 3'-phosphoadenylyl sulfate and chondroitin, whereas its two products are adenosine 3',5'-bisphosphate and Chondroitin 6-sulfate.

This enzyme belongs to the family of transferases, specifically the sulfotransferases, which transfer sulfur-containing groups. The systematic name of this enzyme class is 3'-phosphoadenylyl-sulfate:chondroitin 6'-sulfotransferase. Other names in common use include chondroitin 6-O-sulfotransferase, 3'-phosphoadenosine 5'-phosphosulfate (PAPS):chondroitin sulfate, sulfotransferase, and terminal 6-sulfotransferase. This enzyme participates in chondroitin sulfate biosynthesis and glycan structures - biosynthesis 1.
