= Thiol sulfotransferase =

Class of enzymes

Identifiers
- EC no.: 2.8.2.16
- CAS no.: 70356-45-5

Databases
- IntEnz: IntEnz view
- BRENDA: BRENDA entry
- ExPASy: NiceZyme view
- KEGG: KEGG entry
- MetaCyc: metabolic pathway
- PRIAM: profile
- PDB structures: RCSB PDB PDBe PDBsum
Search
- PMC: articles
- PubMed: articles
- NCBI: proteins

In enzymology, a thiol sulfotransferase (EC 2.8.2.16) is an enzyme that catalyzes the chemical reaction

3'-phosphoadenylyl sulfate + a thiol $\rightleftharpoons$ adenosine 3',5'-bisphosphate + an S-alkyl thiosulfate

Thus, the two substrates of this enzyme are 3'-phosphoadenylyl sulfate and thiol, whereas its two products are adenosine 3',5'-bisphosphate and S-alkyl thiosulfate.

This enzyme belongs to the family of transferases, specifically the sulfotransferases, which transfer sulfur-containing groups. The systematic name of this enzyme class is 3'-phosphoadenylyl-sulfate:thiol S-sulfotransferase. Other names in common use include phosphoadenylylsulfate-thiol sulfotransferase, PAPS sulfotransferase, and adenosine 3'-phosphate 5'-sulphatophosphate sulfotransferase.
