= Keratan sulfotransferase =

Class of enzymes

keratan sulfotransferase

Identifiers
- EC no.: 2.8.2.21
- CAS no.: 62168-79-0

Databases
- IntEnz: IntEnz view
- BRENDA: BRENDA entry
- ExPASy: NiceZyme view
- KEGG: KEGG entry
- MetaCyc: metabolic pathway
- PRIAM: profile
- PDB structures: RCSB PDB PDBe PDBsum
- Gene Ontology: AmiGO / QuickGO
Search
- PMC: articles
- PubMed: articles
- NCBI: proteins

In enzymology, a keratan sulfotransferase (EC 2.8.2.21) is an enzyme that catalyzes the chemical reaction

3'-phosphoadenylyl sulfate + keratan $\rightleftharpoons$ adenosine 3',5'-bisphosphate + keratan 6'-sulfate

Thus, the two substrates of this enzyme are 3'-phosphoadenylyl sulfate and keratan, whereas its two products are adenosine 3',5'-bisphosphate and keratan 6'-sulfate.

This enzyme belongs to the family of transferases, specifically the sulfotransferases, which transfer sulfur-containing groups. The systematic name of this enzyme class is 3'-phosphoadenylyl-sulfate:keratan 6'-sulfotransferase. Other names in common use include 3'-phosphoadenylyl keratan sulfotransferase, keratan sulfate sulfotransferase, and 3'-phosphoadenylylsulfate:keratan sulfotransferase.
