= Tyrosine-ester sulfotransferase =

Class of enzymes

Identifiers
- EC no.: 2.8.2.9
- CAS no.: 9055-56-5

Databases
- BRENDA: enzyme data
- ExPASy: NiceZyme view
- KEGG: enzyme entry
- MetaCyc: metabolic pathway
- Rhea: reactions
- PDB structures: RCSB PDB PDBe PDBsum
- Gene Ontology: AmiGO / QuickGO
Search
- PMC: articles
- PubMed: articles
- NCBI: proteins

Tyrosine-ester sulfotransferase (EC 2.8.2.9) is an enzyme that catalyzes the chemical reaction

tyrosine methyl ester
+
PAPS
tyrosine methyl ester 4-sulfate
+
adenosine 3',5'-bisphosphate

The reaction converts methyl L-tyrosine methyl ester to L-tyrosine methyl ester 4-sulfate by transferring a sulfate group from the cofactor 3'-phosphoadenosine-5'-phosphosulfate (PAPS) and giving adenosine 3',5'-bisphosphate as a byproduct. The enzyme was characterised from rat liver.

This enzyme is a transferase, specifically a sulfotransferase, which transfer sulfur-containing groups. The systematic name of this enzyme class is 3'-phosphoadenylyl-sulfate:L-tyrosine-methyl-ester sulfotransferase. Other names in common use include aryl sulfotransferase IV, and L-tyrosine methyl ester sulfotransferase.
