= (heparan sulfate)-glucosamine N-sulfotransferase =

Class of enzymes

[heparan sulfate]-glucosamine N-sulfotransferase

Identifiers
- EC no.: 2.8.2.8
- CAS no.: 9026-75-9

Databases
- IntEnz: IntEnz view
- BRENDA: BRENDA entry
- ExPASy: NiceZyme view
- KEGG: KEGG entry
- MetaCyc: metabolic pathway
- PRIAM: profile
- PDB structures: RCSB PDB PDBe PDBsum
- Gene Ontology: AmiGO / QuickGO
Search
- PMC: articles
- PubMed: articles
- NCBI: proteins

In enzymology, a [heparan sulfate]-glucosamine N-sulfotransferase (EC 2.8.2.8) is an enzyme that catalyzes the chemical reaction

3'-phosphoadenylyl sulfate + [heparan sulfate]-glucosamine $\rightleftharpoons$ adenosine 3',5'-bisphosphate + [heparan sulfate]-N-sulfoglucosamine

Thus, the two substrates of this enzyme are 3'-phosphoadenylyl sulfate and heparan sulfate-glucosamine, whereas its two products are adenosine 3',5'-bisphosphate and heparan sulfate-N-sulfoglucosamine.

This enzyme belongs to the family of transferases, specifically the sulfotransferases, which transfer sulfur-containing groups. The systematic name of this enzyme class is 3'-phosphoadenylyl-sulfate:[heparan sulfate]-glucosamine N-sulfotransferase. Other names in common use include heparin N-sulfotransferase, 3'-phosphoadenylylsulfate:N-desulfoheparin sulfotransferase, PAPS:N-desulfoheparin sulfotransferase, PAPS:DSH sulfotransferase, N-HSST, N-heparan sulfate sulfotransferase, heparan sulfate N-deacetylase/N-sulfotransferase, heparan sulfate 2-N-sulfotransferase, heparan sulfate N-sulfotransferase, heparan sulfate sulfotransferase, N-desulfoheparin sulfotransferase, desulfoheparin sulfotransferase, 3'-phosphoadenylyl-sulfate:N-desulfoheparin N-sulfotransferase, heparitin sulfotransferase, and 3'-phosphoadenylyl-sulfate:heparitin N-sulfotransferase.
