= Galactosylceramide sulfotransferase =

Class of enzymes

galactosylceramide sulfotransferase

Identifiers
- EC no.: 2.8.2.11
- CAS no.: 9081-06-5

Databases
- IntEnz: IntEnz view
- BRENDA: BRENDA entry
- ExPASy: NiceZyme view
- KEGG: KEGG entry
- MetaCyc: metabolic pathway
- PRIAM: profile
- PDB structures: RCSB PDB PDBe PDBsum
- Gene Ontology: AmiGO / QuickGO
Search
- PMC: articles
- PubMed: articles
- NCBI: proteins

In enzymology, a galactosylceramide sulfotransferase (EC 2.8.2.11) is an enzyme that catalyzes the chemical reaction

3'-phosphoadenylyl sulfate + a galactosylceramide $\rightleftharpoons$ adenosine 3',5'-bisphosphate + a galactosylceramidesulfate

Thus, its two substrates are 3'-phosphoadenylyl sulfate and galactosylceramide, and its two products are adenosine 3',5'-bisphosphate and galactosylceramidesulfate.

It belongs to the family of transferases, specifically the sulfotransferases, which transfer sulfur-containing groups. The systematic name of this enzyme class is 3'-phosphoadenylyl-sulfate:galactosylceramide 3'-sulfotransferase. Other names in common use include GSase, 3'-phosphoadenosine-5'-phosphosulfate-cerebroside sulfotransferase, galactocerebroside sulfotransferase, galactolipid sulfotransferase, glycolipid sulfotransferase, and glycosphingolipid sulfotransferase. This enzyme participates in sphingolipid metabolism.
