= Renilla-luciferin sulfotransferase =

Class of enzymes

Identifiers
- EC no.: 2.8.2.10
- CAS no.: 37278-33-4

Databases
- BRENDA: enzyme data
- ExPASy: NiceZyme view
- KEGG: enzyme entry
- MetaCyc: metabolic pathway
- Rhea: reactions
- PDB structures: RCSB PDB PDBe PDBsum
- Gene Ontology: AmiGO / QuickGO
Search
- PMC: articles
- PubMed: articles
- NCBI: proteins

Renilla-luciferin sulfotransferase (EC 2.8.2.10) is an enzyme that catalyzes the chemical reaction

renilla luciferin
+
PAPS
renilla luciferyl sulfate
+
adenosine 3',5'-bisphosphate

The reaction converts the luciferin, renilla luciferin, to its sulfate derivative by transferring a sulfate group from the cofactor 3'-phosphoadenosine-5'-phosphosulfate (PAPS) and giving adenosine 3',5'-bisphosphate as a byproduct. The enzyme was characterised from Renilla reniformis. The product is also known as luciferyl sulfate. The starting material is related to coelenterazine but lacks one of its phenolic hydroxy groups.

This enzyme is a transferase, specifically a sulfotransferases, which transfer sulfur-containing groups. The systematic name of this enzyme class is 3'-phosphoadenylyl-sulfate:Renilla luciferin sulfotransferase. Other names in common use include luciferin sulfotransferase, luciferin sulfokinase, luciferin sulfokinase (3'-phosphoadenylyl sulfate:luciferin, and sulfotransferase).
