= Sulfate adenylyltransferase (ADP) =

Identifiers
- EC no.: 2.7.7.5
- CAS no.: 9027-70-7

Databases
- IntEnz: IntEnz view
- BRENDA: BRENDA entry
- ExPASy: NiceZyme view
- KEGG: KEGG entry
- MetaCyc: metabolic pathway
- PRIAM: profile
- PDB structures: RCSB PDB PDBe PDBsum
- Gene Ontology: AmiGO / QuickGO
Search
- PMC: articles
- PubMed: articles
- NCBI: proteins

Sulfate adenylyltransferase (ADP) (EC 2.7.7.5) is an enzyme that catalyzes the first of two chemical reactions that convert adenosine diphosphate to 3'-phosphoadenosine-5'-phosphosulfate, a coenzyme in sulfotransferase reactions.

adenosine diphosphate
+ SO^{2−}_{4}
P_{i}
P_{i}
adenosine 5′-phosphosulfate

The enzyme characterised from yeast combines adenosine diphosphate with sulfate ion, giving phosphate (P_{i}) as a byproduct.

This enzyme is a transferase, specifically one transferring phosphorus-containing nucleotide groups (nucleotidyltransferases). The systematic name of this enzyme class is ADP:sulfate adenylyltransferase. Other names in common use include ADP-sulfurylase, sulfate (adenosine diphosphate) adenylyltransferase, and adenosine diphosphate sulfurylase.

== See also ==
- Sulfate adenylyltransferase, which produces the same product from adenosine triphosphate
