= MiR395 microRNA precursor family =

Short RNA molecule

miR395 microRNA precursor family
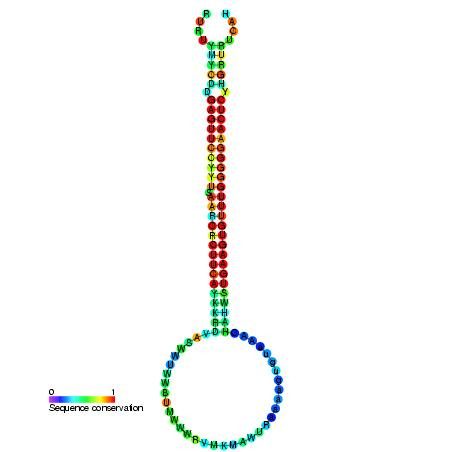
- Predicted secondary structure and sequence conservation of miR395

Identifiers
- Symbol: miR395
- Rfam: RF00451
- miRBase: MI0001007
- miRBase family: MIPF0000016

Other data
- RNA type: microRNA
- Domain: Viridiplantae
- GO: GO:0035195 GO:0035068
- SO: SO:0001244
- PDB structures: PDBe

In molecular biology, miR395 is a conserved plant microRNA that regulates genes involved in sulfur metabolism and transport. Like other plant microRNAs, miR395 controls gene expression by directing cleavage or translational repression of target mRNAs.

miR395 was initially identified computationally in plants including Arabidopsis thaliana and Oryza sativa. Members of the miR395 family primarily target transcripts encoding ATP sulfurylase enzymes and sulfate transporters, key components of sulfate assimilation pathways.

In Arabidopsis, expression of miR395 is strongly induced under sulfate-limiting conditions. The mature miRNA then regulates sulfate uptake and allocation by targeting ATP sulfurylase genes and the sulfate transporter SULTR2;1, helping coordinate sulfur homeostasis in plants.

== See also ==
- MicroRNA
