= Sulfonucleotide reductase =

Sulfonucleotide reductases are a class of enzymes involved in reductive sulfur assimilation. This reaction consists of a conversion from activated sulfate to sulfite. (Inorganic sulfate occurs abundantly on Earth; terrestrial organisms must use sulfate assimilation to convert it to sulfide). The sulfite is used in essential biomolecules such as cysteine. The sulfonucleotide reductases are through to have all evolved from a common ancestor.

The enzymes reduce adenosine-5'-phosphosulfate by nucleophilic attack to produce the sulfite product. This typically involves a cofactor (such as an iron-sulphur cluster), however the cofactor varies in different families.
