= Homocysteine desulfhydrase =

Enzyme

homocysteine desulfhydrase

Identifiers
- EC no.: 4.4.1.2
- CAS no.: 9024-41-3

Databases
- IntEnz: IntEnz view
- BRENDA: BRENDA entry
- ExPASy: NiceZyme view
- KEGG: KEGG entry
- MetaCyc: metabolic pathway
- PRIAM: profile
- PDB structures: RCSB PDB PDBe PDBsum
- Gene Ontology: AmiGO / QuickGO
Search
- PMC: articles
- PubMed: articles
- NCBI: proteins

The enzyme homocysteine desulfhydrase (EC 4.4.1.2) catalyzes the chemical reaction

L-homocysteine + H_{2}O = hydrogen sulfide + NH_{3} + 2-oxobutanoate (overall reaction)

(1a) L-homocysteine = hydrogen sulfide + 2-aminobut-2-enoate
(1b) 2-aminobut-2-enoate = 2-iminobutanoate (spontaneous)
(1c) 2-iminobutanoate + H_{2}O = 2-oxobutanoate + NH_{3} (spontaneous)

This enzyme belongs to the family of lyases, specifically the class of carbon-sulfur lyases. The systematic name of this enzyme class is L-homocysteine hydrogen-sulfide-lyase (deaminating; 2-oxobutanoate-forming). Other names in common use include homocysteine desulfurase, L-homocysteine hydrogen-sulfide-lyase (deaminating). This enzyme participates in nitrogen and sulfur metabolism. It employs one cofactor, pyridoxal phosphate.
