= HUP domain =

Protein structural motif

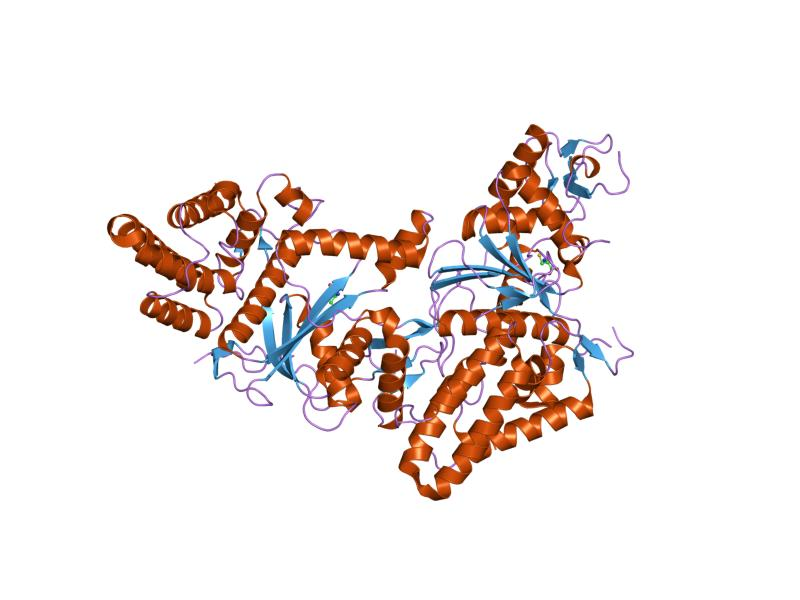
- Cartoon representation of the molecular structure of the crystal structure of cysteinyl-tRNA synthetase from Escherichia coli with cysteine substrate bound (PDB: 1li7)

Identifiers
- Symbol: HUP
- Pfam clan: CL0039
- ECOD: 2005.1

In molecular biology the HUP domain, often referred to as Rossmann-like or Rossmannoid, is a nucleotide binding domain that catalyses adenylation reactions through the release of pyrophosphate and plays critical roles in various enzymatic functions, including aminoacyl-tRNA synthesis and biosynthesis of cofactors like NAD, FAD, and CoA.

== Structure ==
The HUP domain adopts a Rossmann-like fold, consisting of a five-stranded parallel β-sheet in a 5-4-1-2-3 configuration surrounded by α-helices.

== Function ==
The HUP domain catalyses adenylation reactions through the release of pyrophosphate. It binds nucleotides, particularly adenine-based molecules like ATP or AMP, with ribose binding being its most conserved feature. Proteins containing this domain show great functional diversity: HUP domains are found in both enzymatic and non-enzymatic proteins, with functions ranging from aminoacyl-tRNA synthesis to electron transfer. This broad functional spectrum is unusual for nucleotide binding domains.

== Functional subgroups ==
The domain is found in proteins with a wide variety of multidomain architectures, which contribute to its functional versatility. The HUP domain superfamily is divided into several functional sub-groups based on their diverse functions and mechanisms:

- Class I aminoacyl-tRNA synthetases (AATRSs): These enzymes are responsible for attaching amino acids to their corresponding tRNAs
- Nucleotide synthetases: This group includes enzymes involved in the biosynthesis of nucleotides, such as GMP synthetase (GMPS) and NAD synthetase (NADS)
- Asparagine synthetase (ASNS): An enzyme that catalyses the synthesis of asparagine from aspartate and glutamine
- ATP sulfurylases: These enzymes catalyse the first step in sulfate assimilation and activation
- Electron transfer flavoprotein α (ETFα): A non-enzymatic protein involved in electron transfer processes
- Cryptochrome/DNA photolyase family: These proteins are involved in DNA repair and light-dependent signalling
- Other adenylating enzymes: This group includes various enzymes that catalyse adenylation reactions

== Evolution ==
Despite sharing structural similarities with Rossmann folds, the HUP domain appears to have evolved independently. The HUP domain has demonstrated remarkable evolutionary plasticity with an evolution characterised by structural and functional diversification while maintaining a conserved core structure. Ribose binding remains conserved, but the location and mode of binding to the base and phosphate moieties of nucleotides have diverged over time.
