= Sulfite dehydrogenase =

sulfite dehydrogenase
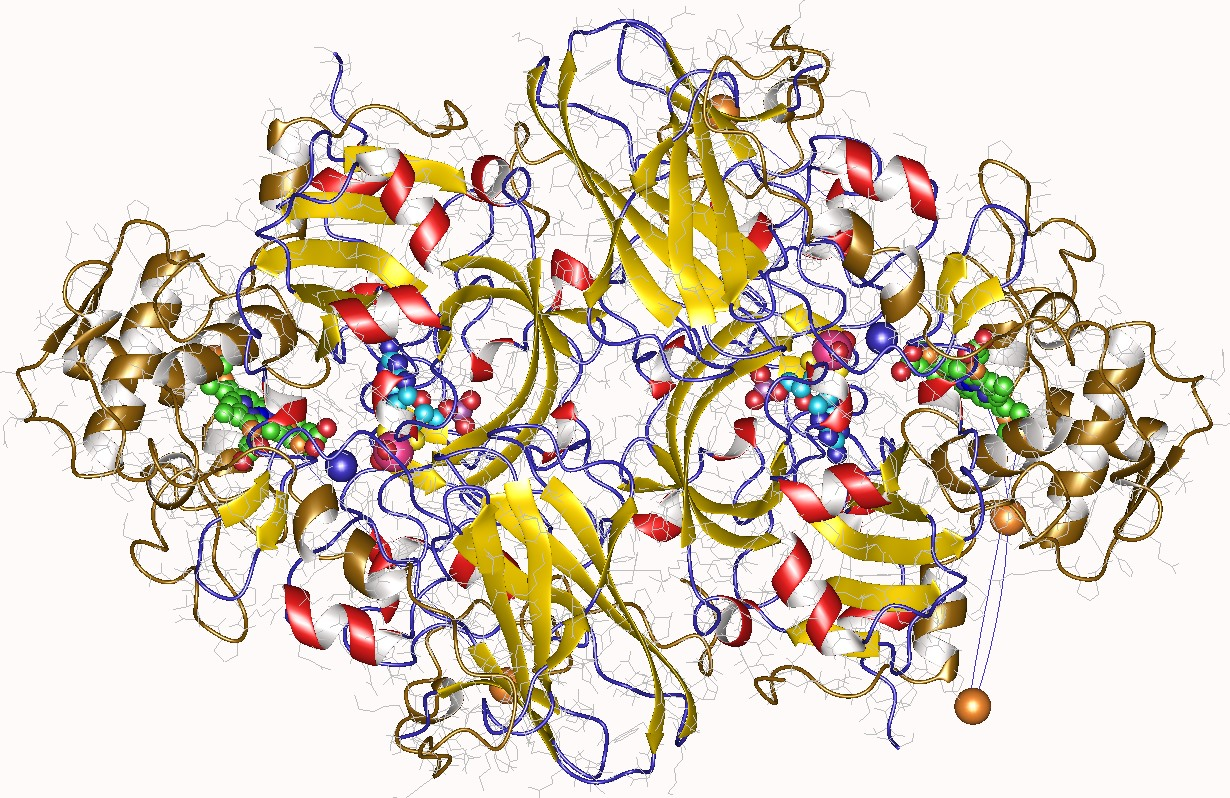
- Sulfite dehydrogenase heterotetramer, Paracoccus pantotrophus

Identifiers
- EC no.: 1.8.2.1
- CAS no.: 37256-47-6

Databases
- IntEnz: IntEnz view
- BRENDA: BRENDA entry
- ExPASy: NiceZyme view
- KEGG: KEGG entry
- MetaCyc: metabolic pathway
- PRIAM: profile
- PDB structures: RCSB PDB PDBe PDBsum
- Gene Ontology: AmiGO / QuickGO
Search
- PMC: articles
- PubMed: articles
- NCBI: proteins

In enzymology, a sulfite dehydrogenase (EC 1.8.2.1) is an enzyme that catalyzes the chemical reaction

sulfite + 2 ferricytochrome c + H_{2}O $\rightleftharpoons$ sulfate + 2 ferrocytochrome c + 2 H^{+}

The 3 substrates of this enzyme are sulfite, ferricytochrome c, and H_{2}O, whereas its 3 products are sulfate, ferrocytochrome c, and H^{+}.

This enzyme belongs to the family of oxidoreductases, specifically those acting on a sulfur group of donor with a cytochrome as acceptor. The systematic name of this enzyme class is sulfite:ferricytochrome-c oxidoreductase. Other names in common use include sulfite cytochrome c reductase, sulfite-cytochrome c oxidoreductase, and sulfite oxidase. This enzyme participates in sulfur metabolism.
