= 3'(2'),5'-bisphosphate nucleotidase =

Class of enzymes

3′(2′),5′-bisphosphate nucleotidase
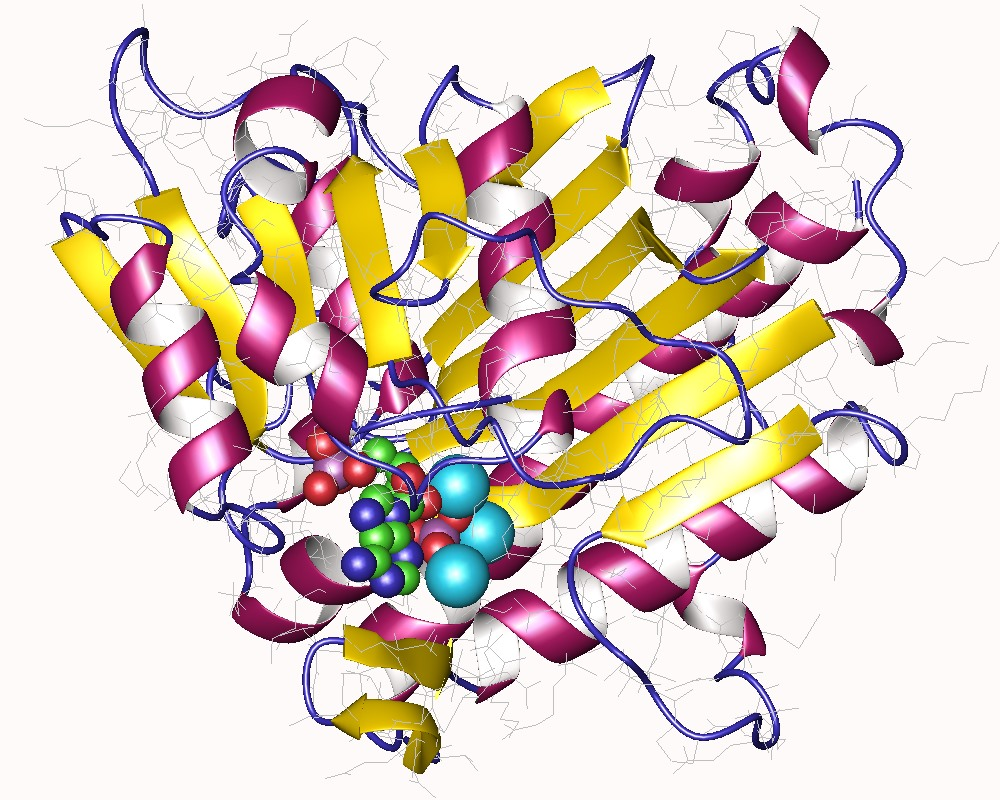
- 3′(2′),5′'-bisphosphate nucleotidase monomer, Human

Identifiers
- EC no.: 3.1.3.7
- CAS no.: 9025-83-6

Databases
- BRENDA: enzyme data
- ExPASy: NiceZyme view
- KEGG: enzyme entry
- MetaCyc: metabolic pathway
- Rhea: reactions
- PDB structures: RCSB PDB PDBe PDBsum
- Gene Ontology: AmiGO / QuickGO
Search
- PMC: articles
- PubMed: articles
- NCBI: proteins

The enzyme 3′(2′),5′-bisphosphate nucleotidase (EC 3.1.3.7) catalyzes several related reactions. For example, when characterised from guinea pig liver and Debaryomyces hansenii, it hydrolyses adenosine 3',5'-bisphosphate to adenosine monophosphate and orthophosphate:

adenosine 3',5'-bisphosphate
H_{2}O
P_{i}
adenosine monophosphate

It also hydrolyses 3'-phosphoadenosine-5'-phosphosulfate to 5'-adenylyl sulfate, which has a role in the incorporation of sulfate in metabolism.

3'-phosphoadenosine-5'-phosphosulfate
H_{2}O
P_{i}
5'-adenylyl sulfate

This enzyme is a hydrolase, specifically one acting on phosphoric monoester bonds. The systematic name is adenosine-3′(2′),5′-bisphosphate 3′(2′)-phosphohydrolase. Other names in common use include phosphoadenylate 3′-nucleotidase, 3′-phosphoadenylylsulfate 3′-phosphatase, and 3′(2′),5′-bisphosphonucleoside 3′(2′)-phosphohydrolase.

== Structural studies ==
As of late 2007, 6 structures have been solved for this class of enzymes, with PDB accession codes PDB: 1JP4, PDB: 1K9Y, PDB: 1K9Z, PDB: 1KA0, PDB: 1KA1, and PDB: 1QGX.
