= PAPSS1 =

Protein-coding gene in the species Homo sapiens

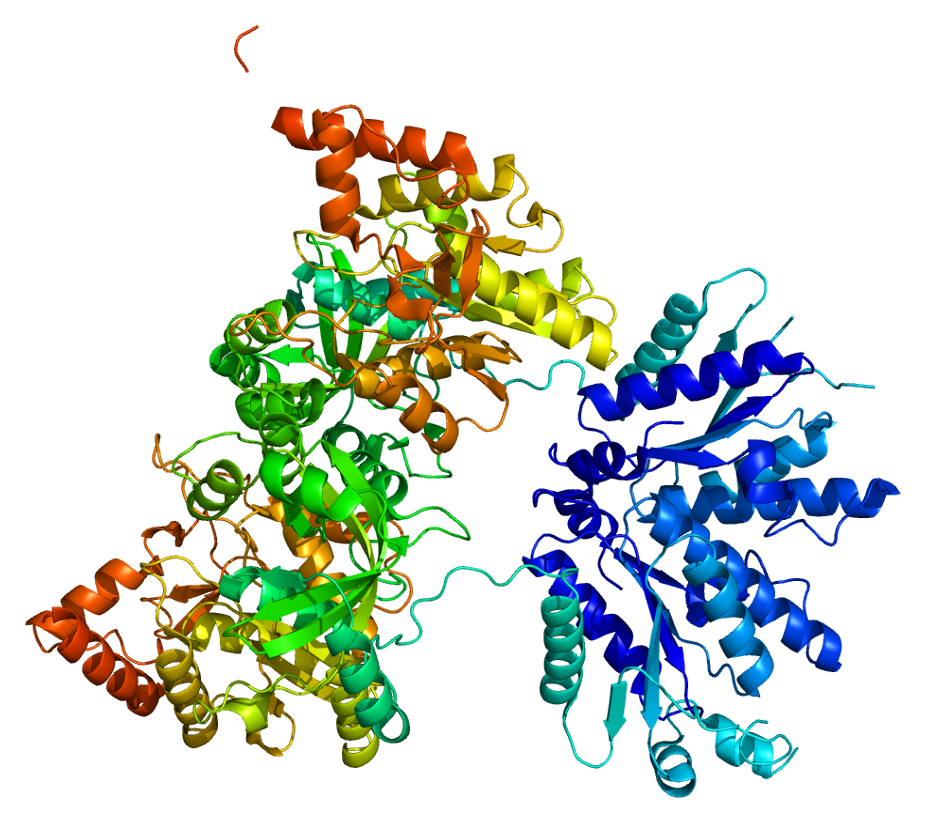
Available structures
PDB	Ortholog search: PDBe RCSB
PDB	List of PDB id codes 1X6V, 1XJQ, 1XNJ, 2OFW, 2OFX, 2PEY, 2PEZ, 2QJF

Identifiers
- Aliases: PAPSS1, ATPSK1, PAPSS, SK1, 3'-phosphoadenosine 5'-phosphosulfate synthase 1
- External IDs: OMIM: 603262; MGI: 1330587; HomoloGene: 81740; GeneCards: PAPSS1; OMA:PAPSS1 - orthologs

Gene location (Human)
Chr.	Chromosome 4 (human)
Band	4q25	Start	107,590,276 bp
Band	4q25	End	107,720,234 bp

Gene location (Mouse)
Chr.	Chromosome 3 (mouse)
Band	3 G3|3 61.05 cM	Start	131,270,529 bp
Band	3 G3|3 61.05 cM	End	131,349,432 bp
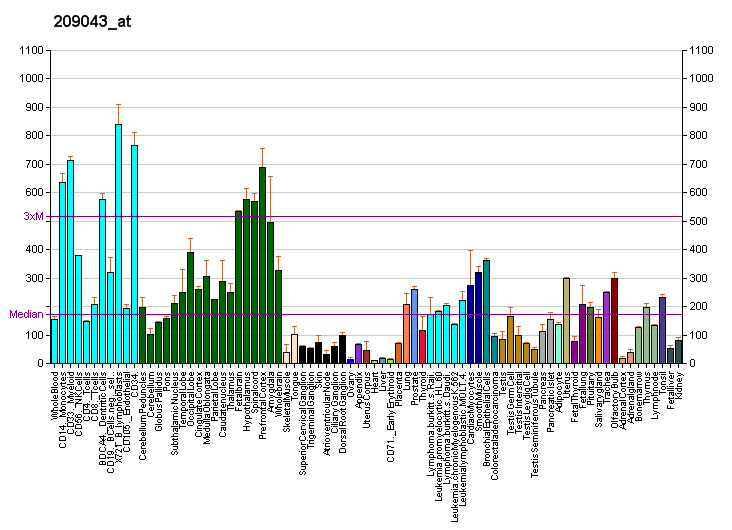
RNA expression pattern
Bgee	Human / Mouse (ortholog); Top expressed in: inferior ganglion of vagus nerve; secondary oocyte; pons; bronchial epithelial cell; subthalamic nucleus; pylorus; corpus callosum; endometrium; superior vestibular nucleus; Brodmann area 46 / Top expressed in: vestibular membrane of cochlear duct; left colon; submandibular gland; vestibular sensory epithelium; lacrimal gland; migratory enteric neural crest cell; medullary collecting duct; ileum; human fetus; utricle; More reference expression data
BioGPS	More reference expression data
Gene ontology
Molecular function	transferase activity; nucleotide binding; nucleotidyltransferase activity; catalytic activity; ATP binding; kinase activity; sulfate adenylyltransferase (ATP) activity; protein homodimerization activity; adenylylsulfate kinase activity
Cellular component	cytosol
Biological process	skeletal system development; metabolism; phosphorylation; sulfate assimilation; 3'-phosphoadenosine 5'-phosphosulfate biosynthetic process
Sources:Amigo / QuickGO
Orthologs
Species	Human	Mouse
Entrez	9061	23971
Ensembl	ENSG00000138801	ENSMUSG00000028032
UniProt	O43252	Q60967
RefSeq (mRNA)	NM_005443	NM_001289477; NM_001289478; NM_001289479; NM_011863
RefSeq (protein)	NP_005434	NP_001276406; NP_001276407; NP_001276408; NP_035993
Location (UCSC)	Chr 4: 107.59 – 107.72 Mb	Chr 3: 131.27 – 131.35 Mb
PubMed search
- Wikidata
View/Edit Human	View/Edit Mouse

Bifunctional 3'-phosphoadenosine 5'-phosphosulfate synthetase 1 is an enzyme that in humans is encoded by the PAPSS1 gene.

Three-prime-phosphoadenosine 5-prime-phosphosulfate (PAPS) is the sulfate donor cosubstrate for all sulfotransferase (SULT) enzymes (Xu et al., 2000). SULTs catalyze the sulfate conjugation of many endogenous and exogenous compounds, including drugs and other xenobiotics. In humans, PAPS is synthesized from adenosine 5-prime triphosphate (ATP) and inorganic sulfate by 2 isoforms, PAPSS1 and PAPSS2 (MIM 603005).[supplied by OMIM]
