= APK =

APK or apk may refer to:

== Government and politics ==
- Alliance Party of Kenya (2012–2016)
- Algemene Periodieke Keuring, the vehicle inspection procedure in the Netherlands
- Arbejderpartiet Kommunisterne (founded 2000), Denmark
- Arbetarpartiet Kommunisterna (1977–1995), Sweden

== Science and technology ==
- apk (file format), a package format used by Android
- Alpine Package Keeper, in Alpine Linux
- Adenylyl-sulfate kinase, a protein family

== Other uses ==
- Afrikaanse Protestantse Kerk (founded 1987), a South African federation of the Reformed Church
- Plains Apache language (ISO 639-3 code: apk)
- Air Peace, a Nigerian airline (ICAO code: APK)
