= Sulfur assimilation =

Incorporation of sulfur into living organisms

Sulfate reduction and assimilation in plants (APS, adenosine 5'-phosphosulfate; Fdred, Fdox, reduced and oxidized ferredoxin; RSH, RSSR, reduced and oxidized glutathione; SQDG, sulfoquinovosyl diacylglycerol)

Sulfur assimilation is the process by which living organisms incorporate sulfur into their biological molecules. In plants, sulfate is absorbed by the roots and then transported to the chloroplasts by the transpiration stream where the sulfur are reduced to sulfide with the help of a series of enzymatic reactions. Furthermore, the reduced sulfur is incorporated into cysteine, an amino acid that is a precursor to many other sulfur-containing compounds. In animals, sulfur assimilation occurs primarily through the diet, as animals cannot produce sulfur-containing compounds directly. Sulfur is incorporated into amino acids such as cysteine and methionine, which are used to build proteins and other important molecules.

== Plants ==
=== Uptake ===
Sulfate uptake occurs in roots. The maximal sulfate uptake rate is generally already reached at sulfate levels of 0.1 mM and lower. The uptake of sulfate by the roots and its transport to the shoot appears to be one of the primary regulatory sites of sulfur assimilation.

Sulfate is actively taken up across the plasma membrane of the root cells, subsequently loaded into the xylem vessels and transported to the shoot by the transpiration stream. The uptake and transport of sulfate is ATP-dependent. Sulfate is reduced in the chloroplasts. Sulfate in plant tissue is predominantly present in the vacuole, since the concentration of sulfate in the cytoplasm is kept rather constant.

Distinct sulfate transporter proteins mediate the uptake, transport and subcellular distribution of sulfate. The sulfate transporters gene family has been classified in up to 5 different groups according to their cellular and sub-cellular gene expression, and possible functioning. Each group of transporter proteins may be expressed exclusively in the roots or shoots of the plant, or both.

- Group 1 are 'high affinity sulfate transporters', which are involved in the uptake of sulfate by the roots.
- Group 2 are vascular transporters and are 'low affinity sulfate transporters'.
- Group 3 is the so-called 'leaf group', however, still little is known about the characteristics of this group.
- Group 4 transporters are involved in the efflux of sulfate from the vacuoles, whereas the function of Group 5 sulfate transporters is not known yet, and likely function only as molybdate transporters.

Regulation and expression of the majority of sulfate transporters are controlled by the sulfur nutritional status of the plants. Upon sulfate deprivation, the rapid decrease in root sulfate is regularly accompanied by a strongly enhanced expression of most sulfate transporter genes (up to 100-fold) accompanied by enhanced sulfate uptake capacity. It is not yet fully understood whether sulfate and other metabolic products of sulfur assimilation (O-acetylserine, cysteine, glutathione) act as signals in the regulation of sulfate uptake and transport, or in the expression of the sulfate transporters involved.

=== Sulfate reduction ===
Sulfate reduction predominantly takes place in the leaf chloroplasts. The reduction of sulfate to sulfide occurs in three steps beginning with its conversion to adenosine 5'-phosphosulfate (APS). This first step is catalyzed by ATP sulfurylase. The affinity of this enzyme for sulfate is low (K_{m} approximately 1 mM), and the in situ sulfate concentration in the chloroplast is most likely one of the limiting/regulatory steps in sulfur reduction. Subsequently, APS is reduced to sulfite, catalyzed by APS reductase. Glutathione is the proposed reductant.

The latter reaction is assumed to be one of the primary regulation points in the sulfate reduction, since the activity of APS reductase is the lowest of the enzymes of the sulfate reduction pathway and it has a fast turnover rate. Sulfite is with high affinity reduced by sulfite reductase to sulfide with ferredoxin as a reductant. The remaining sulfate in plant tissue is transferred into the vacuole. The remobilization and redistribution of the vacuolar sulfate reserves appear to be rather slow and sulfur-deficient plants may still contain detectable levels of sulfate.

=== Selected biosyntheses ===
==== Cysteine ====
Sulfide is incorporated into cysteine, catalyzed by O-acetylserine (thiol)lyase, with O-acetylserine as substrate. The synthesis of O-acetylserine is catalyzed by serine acetyltransferase and together with O-acetylserine (thiol)lyase it is associated as enzyme complex named cysteine synthase.

The formation of cysteine is the direct coupling step between sulfur (sulfur metabolism) and nitrogen assimilation in plants. This differs from the process in yeast, where sulfide must be incorporated first in homocysteine then converted in two steps to cysteine.

Cysteine is sulfur donor for the synthesis of methionine, the major other sulfur-containing amino acid present in plants. This happens through the transsulfuration pathway and the methylation of homocysteine.

Both cysteine and methionine are sulfur-containing amino acids and are of great significance in the structure, conformation and function of proteins and enzymes, but high levels of these amino acids may also be present in seed storage proteins. The thiol groups of the cysteine residues in proteins can be oxidized resulting in disulfide bridges with other cysteine side chains (and form cystine) and/or linkage of polypeptides.

Disulfide bridges (disulfide bonds) make an important contribution to the structure of proteins. The thiol groups are also of great importance in substrate binding of enzymes, in metal-sulfur clusters in proteins (e.g. ferredoxins) and in regulatory proteins (e.g. thioredoxins).

==== Glutathione ====
Glutathione or its homologues, e.g. homoglutathione in Fabaceae; hydroxymethylglutathione in Poaceae are the major water-soluble non-protein thiol compounds present in plant tissue and account for 1-2% of the total sulfur. The content of glutathione in plant tissue ranges from 0.1 – 3 mM. Cysteine is the precursor to glutathione (and its homologues). First, γ-glutamylcysteine is synthesized from cysteine and glutamate catalyzed by gamma-glutamylcysteine synthetase. Second, glutathione is synthesized from γ-glutamylcysteine and glycine (in glutathione homologues, β-alanine or serine) catalyzed by glutathione synthetase. Both steps of the synthesis of glutathione are ATP-dependent. Glutathione is maintained in the reduced form by an NADPH-dependent glutathione reductase, and the ratio of reduced glutathione (GSH) to oxidized glutathione (GSSG) generally exceeds a value of 7.

In sulfur metabolism glutathione is reductant for the conversion of APS to sulfite. It is also the major transport form of reduced sulfur in plants. Roots likely largely depend for their reduced sulfur supply on shoot/root transfer of glutathione via the phloem, since the reduction of sulfur occurs predominantly in the chloroplast. Glutathione is also involved in the reduction and assimilation of selenite into selenocysteine.

==== Sulfolipids ====
Sulfolipids are sulfur containing lipids. Sulfoquinovosyl diacylglycerols are the predominant sulfolipids present in plants. In leaves its content comprises up to 3 - 6% of the total sulfur present. This sulfolipid is present in plastid membranes and likely is involved in chloroplast functioning. The route of biosynthesis and physiological function of sulfoquinovosyl diacylglycerol is still under investigation. From recent studies it is evident that sulfite it the likely sulfur precursor for the formation of the sulfoquinovose group of this lipid.

==== Other sulfur compounds ====
Brassica species contain glucosinolates, which are sulfur-containing secondary compounds. Glucosinolates are composed of a β-thioglucose moiety, a sulfonated oxime and a side chain. The synthesis of glucosinolates starts with the oxidation of the parent amino acid to an aldoxime, followed by the addition of a thiol group (through conjugation with glutathione) to produce thiohydroximate. The transfer of a glucose and a sulfate moiety completes the formation of the glucosinolates.

The physiological significance of glucosinolates is still ambiguous, though they are considered to function as sink compounds in situations of sulfur excess. Upon tissue disruption glucosinolates are enzymatically degraded by myrosinase and may yield a variety of biologically active products such as isothiocyanates, thiocyanates, nitriles and oxazolidine-2-thiones. The glucosinolate-myrosinase system is assumed to play a role in plant-herbivore and plant-pathogen interactions.

Allium species contain γ-glutamylpeptides and alliins (S-alk(en)yl cysteine sulfoxides). The content of these sulfur-containing secondary compounds strongly depends on stage of development of the plant, temperature, water availability and the level of nitrogen and sulfur nutrition. In onion bulbs their content may account for up to 80% of the organic sulfur fraction.

It is assumed that alliins are predominantly synthesized in the leaves, from where they are subsequently transferred to the attached bulb scale. The biosynthetic pathways of synthesis of γ-glutamylpeptides and alliins are ambiguous. γ-Glutamylpeptides can be formed from cysteine (via γ-glutamylcysteine or glutathione) and can be metabolized into the corresponding alliins via oxidation and subsequent hydrolyzation by γ-glutamyl transpeptidases.

== Animals ==
Unlike in plants, animals do not have a pathway for the direct assimilation of inorganic sulfate into organic compounds. In animals, the primary source of sulfur is dietary methionine, an essential amino acid that contains a sulfur atom. Methionine is first converted to S-adenosylmethionine (SAM), a compound that is involved in many important biological processes, including DNA methylation and neurotransmitter synthesis.

SAM can then be used to synthesize other important sulfur-containing compounds such as cysteine, taurine, and glutathione. Cysteine is a precursor for the synthesis of several important proteins and peptides, as well as glutathione, a powerful antioxidant that protects cells from oxidative stress. Taurine is involved in a variety of physiological processes, including osmoregulation, modulation of calcium signaling, and regulation of mitochondrial function.

== Microorganisms ==
In bacteria and fungi, the sulfur assimilation pathway is similar to that in plants, where inorganic sulfate is reduced to sulfide, and then incorporated into cysteine and other sulfur-containing compounds.

Bacteria and fungi can absorb inorganic sulfate from the environment through a sulfate transporter, which is regulated by the presence of sulfate in the medium. Once inside the cell, sulfate is activated by ATP sulfurylase to form adenosine 5'-phosphosulfate (APS), which is then reduced to sulfite by APS reductase. Sulfite is further reduced to sulfide by sulfite reductase, which is then incorporated into cysteine by enzyme.

Cysteine, once synthesized, can be used for the biosynthesis of methionine and other important biomolecules. In addition, microorganisms also use sulfur-containing compounds for various other purposes, such as the synthesis of antibiotics.

Sulfur assimilation in microorganisms is regulated by a variety of environmental factors, including the availability of sulfur in the medium and the presence of other nutrients. The activity of key enzymes in the sulfur assimilation pathway is also regulated by feedback inhibition from downstream products, similar to the regulation seen in plants.

== Regulation of sulfur assimilation ==
Sulfur assimilation is highly regulated and influenced by both external environmental factors and internal metabolic feedback pathways, in order to maintain sulfur homeostasis. Under sulfur-deficient conditions, plants modify their internal pathways to enhance sulfur uptake. In plants, a key regulator is the transcription factor SLIM1 (Sulfur Limitation 1), which functions in activating genes involved in sulfur transport like SULTR1;2 (a high-affinity transporter) and those involved in sulfur assimilation like ATP sulfurylase and APS reductase. The post-transcriptional regulation of these genes are done via a microRNA called miR395. When sulfur uptake is sufficient and is no longer limited, this microRNA targets the SULTR2;1(a low-affinity transporter) and degrades/inhibits its translation. Besides the transcriptional regulation of sulfur assimilation, there also lies post-translational mechanisms that control this process. This includes feedback inhibition by the accumulation of end products such as glutathione and cysteine, as well as regulation of the enzyme APS reductase which is activated or inhibited by the redox state of the cell.

In fungi, specifically the Aspergillus fumigatus, sulfur assimilation is managed by the transcription factor MetR. This transcription factor functions similarly to SLIM1, in which under sulfur-limiting conditions it activates genes responsible for sulfur uptake. MetR also plays a key role in protecting the fungus's virulence against the host-immune system. Additionally, the regulation of sulfur plays an interconnected role with other nutrient cycles like carbon, nitrogen, and iron. For example, if MetR is impaired, the management of iron homeostasis is at risk. In plants, under sulfur-limiting conditions they optimize nitrogen assimilation to maintain metabolic homeostasis.

In animals, since sulfur uptake is primarily obtained through the diet in the form of cysteine or methionine, the regulation of sulfur metabolism is done via the transsulfuration pathway. In this pathway, methionine is converted to homocysteine and then later converted to cysteine via the enzymes Cystathionine Beta-synthase (CBS) and Cystathionine gamma-lyase (CGL). Cysteine is utilized for glutathione production, and high levels of glutathione feedback negatively to downregulate the enzymes CBS and CGL.

Regulation of sulfur assimilation is tightly controlled to ensure balanced production of sulfur-compounds like cysteine, methionine, and glutathione. These are key molecules that play a role in redox balance, and protein synthesis. Sulfur levels are also interconnected with other nutrient cycles to maintain an overall metabolic balance in plants, animals, and fungi.

== See also ==
- Plant nutrition
- Sulfonucleotide reductase
- Sulfur metabolism
