= Adenylylsulfatase =

Class of enzymes

adenylylsulfatase

Identifiers
- EC no.: 3.6.2.1
- CAS no.: 37289-36-4

Databases
- IntEnz: IntEnz view
- BRENDA: BRENDA entry
- ExPASy: NiceZyme view
- KEGG: KEGG entry
- MetaCyc: metabolic pathway
- PRIAM: profile
- PDB structures: RCSB PDB PDBe PDBsum
- Gene Ontology: AmiGO / QuickGO
Search
- PMC: articles
- PubMed: articles
- NCBI: proteins

In enzymology, an adenylylsulfatase (EC 3.6.2.1) is an enzyme that catalyzes the chemical reaction

adenylyl sulfate + H_{2}O $\rightleftharpoons$ AMP + sulfate + 2H^{+}

Thus, the two substrates of this enzyme are adenylyl sulfate and H_{2}O, whereas its two products are AMP and sulfate.

This enzyme belongs to the family of hydrolases, specifically those acting on acid anhydrides in sulfonyl-containing anhydrides. The systematic name of this enzyme class is adenylyl-sulfate sulfohydrolase. Other names in common use include adenosine 5-phosphosulfate sulfohydrolase, and adenylylsulfate sulfohydrolase. This enzyme participates in sulfur metabolism.
