= Spondyloepimetaphyseal dysplasia =

- Other names: Spondyloepimetaphyseal dysplasia congenita, Strudwick type
- Spondyloepimetaphyseal dysplasia is inherited in an autosomal dominant manner

Spondyloepimetaphyseal dysplasia, or spondylometaphyseal dysplasia, is a genetic condition affecting the bones.

Types include:

- Spondyloepimetaphyseal dysplasia, Strudwick type
- Spondyloepiphyseal dysplasia congenita
- Spondyloepimetaphyseal dysplasia, Pakistani type
- Spondylometaphyseal dysplasia
