= Spondyloepimetaphyseal dysplasia, Pakistani type =

- Other names: Spondyloepimetaphyseal dysplasia, PAPSS2 type
- Spondyloepimetaphyseal dysplasia, Pakistani type is inherited in an autosomal recessive manner
- Specialty: Medical genetics

Spondyloepimetaphyseal dysplasia, Pakistani type is a form of spondyloepimetaphyseal dysplasia involving PAPSS2 (also known as "ATPSK2"). The condition is rare.

== Genetics ==
This condition is inherited in an autosomal recessive fashion. It is due to mutations in the Bifunctional 3'-phosphoadenosine 5'-phosphosulfate synthetase 2 (PAPSS2) gene which is located on the long arm of chromosome 10 (10q23.2-q23.31).

== History ==
This condition was first described in a large eight generation consanguineous Pakistani family.

The causative mutation was identified in 1998.
