= Scymnol =

Synthetic skin conditioning ingredient

Names
- IUPAC name (3R,5S,7R,8R,9S,10S,12S,13R,14S,17R)-17-[(2R,5R)-5,7-Dihydroxy-6-(hydroxymethyl)heptan-2-yl]-10,13-dimethyl-2,3,4,5,6,7,8,9,11,12,14,15,16,17-tetradecahydro-1H-cyclopenta[a]phenanthrene-3,7,12-triol

Identifiers
CAS Number	6785-34-8
3D model (JSmol)	Interactive image
ChEBI	CHEBI:50106
ChemSpider	145073
PubChem CID	165531
CompTox Dashboard (EPA)	DTXSID10987196
- InChI: InChI=1S/C27H48O6/c1-15(4-7-22(31)16(13-28)14-29)19-5-6-20-25-21(12-24(33)27(19,20)3)26(2)9-8-18(30)10-17(26)11-23(25)32/h15-25,28-33H,4-14H2,1-3H3/t15-,17+,18-,19-,20+,21+,22-,23-,24+,25+,26+,27-/m1/s1 Key: DIPHJTHZUWDJIK-JPLAUYQNSA-N
- SMILES: C[C@H](CC[C@H](C(CO)CO)O)[C@H]1CC[C@@H]2[C@@]1([C@H](C[C@H]3[C@H]2[C@@H](C[C@H]4[C@@]3(CC[C@H](C4)O)C)O)O)C

Properties
Chemical formula	C_{27}H_{48}O_{6}
Molar mass	468.675 g·mol^{−1}
- Except where otherwise noted, data are given for materials in their standard state (at 25 °C [77 °F], 100 kPa). Infobox references

Scymnol, more specifically 5β-scymnol, is a synthetic INCI-listed skin conditioning ingredient. The molecule is a steroid derivative that behaves as a hydroxyl radical scavenger and is used for the treatment of skin blemishes such as blocked pores and acne.

== History ==
The molecule was identified and isolated from shark tissues by Professor Takuo Kosuge, Shizuoka College of Pharmacy, Shizuoka, Japan during the 1980s. Based on usage as a traditional folk remedy, it was hypothesised the ingredient may be effective for the treatment of scalds, blemishes and acne.

== Traits ==
Scymnol is a hydroxyl radical scavenger. Scymnol's role in quenching free radicals may play a role in inhibiting acne.
