= D-glutamyltransferase =

Identifiers
- EC no.: 2.3.2.1
- CAS no.: 9030-02-8

Databases
- IntEnz: IntEnz view
- BRENDA: BRENDA entry
- ExPASy: NiceZyme view
- KEGG: KEGG entry
- MetaCyc: metabolic pathway
- PRIAM: profile
- PDB structures: RCSB PDB PDBe PDBsum
- Gene Ontology: AmiGO / QuickGO
Search
- PMC: articles
- PubMed: articles
- NCBI: proteins

In enzymology, a D-glutamyltransferase (EC 2.3.2.1) is an enzyme that catalyzes the chemical reaction

L(or D)-glutamine + D-glutamyl-peptide $\rightleftharpoons$ NH_{3} + 5-glutamyl-D-glutamyl-peptide

The 3 substrates of this enzyme are L-glutamine, D-glutamine, and D-glutamyl-peptide, whereas its two products are NH_{3} and 5-glutamyl-D-glutamyl-peptide.

This enzyme belongs to the family of transferases, specifically the aminoacyltransferases. The systematic name of this enzyme class is glutamine:D-glutamyl-peptide 5-glutamyltransferase. Other names in common use include D-glutamyl transpeptidase, and D-gamma-glutamyl transpeptidase. This enzyme participates in d-glutamine and d-glutamate metabolism.
