= PAPSS2 =

Protein-coding gene in the species Homo sapiens

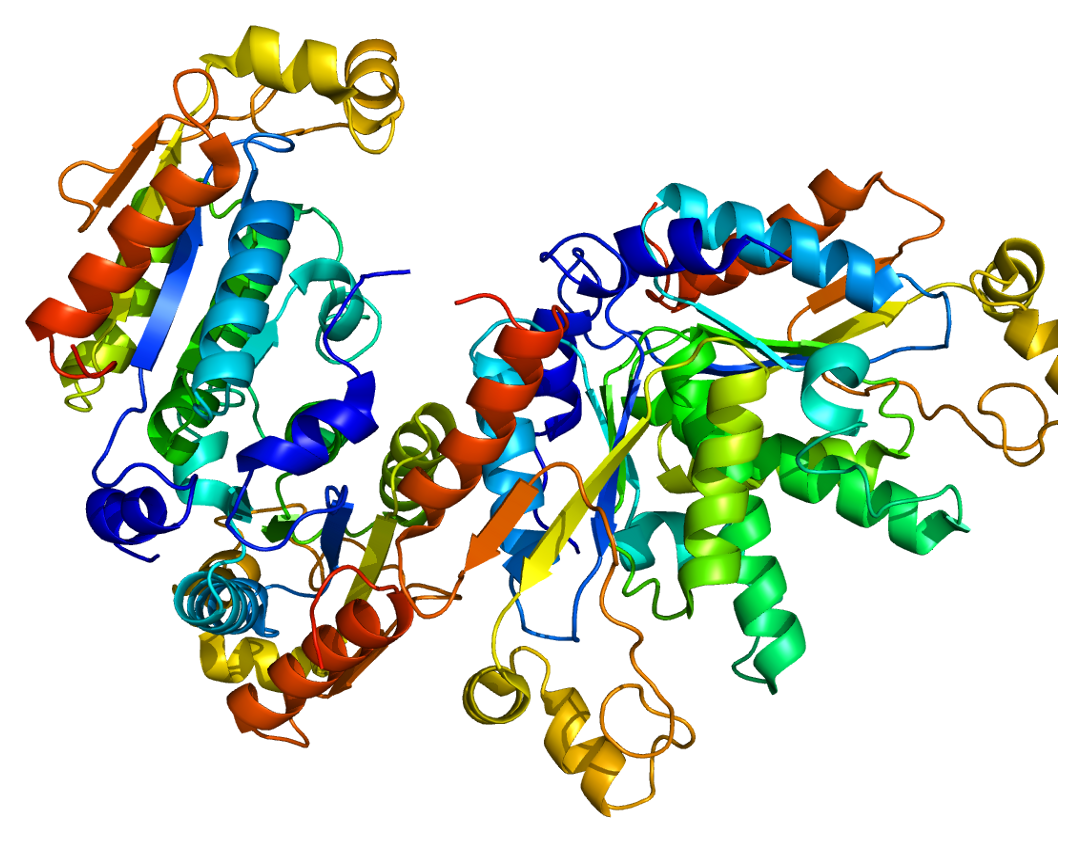
Available structures
PDB	Ortholog search: PDBe RCSB
PDB	List of PDB id codes 2AX4

Identifiers
- Aliases: PAPSS2, ATPSK2, BCYM4, SK2, 3'-phosphoadenosine 5'-phosphosulfate synthase 2
- External IDs: OMIM: 603005; MGI: 1330223; HomoloGene: 55840; GeneCards: PAPSS2; OMA:PAPSS2 - orthologs

Gene location (Human)
Chr.	Chromosome 10 (human)
Band	10q23.2-q23.31	Start	87,659,613 bp
Band	10q23.2-q23.31	End	87,747,705 bp

Gene location (Mouse)
Chr.	Chromosome 19 (mouse)
Band	19 C1|19 27.46 cM	Start	32,573,190 bp
Band	19 C1|19 27.46 cM	End	32,644,587 bp
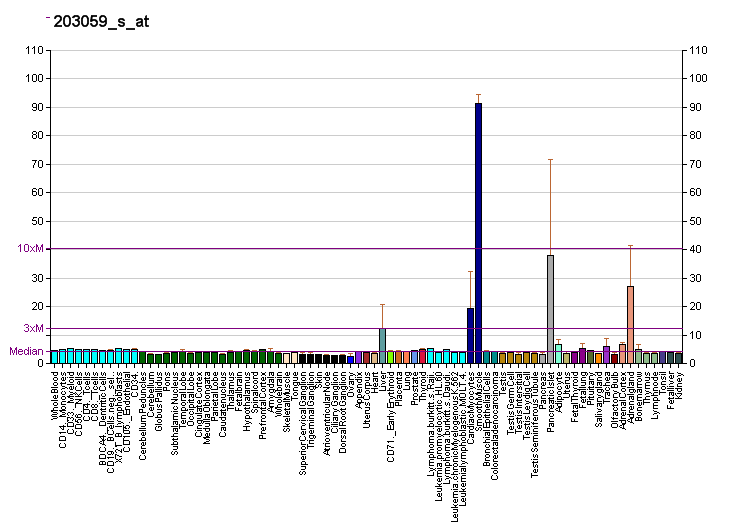

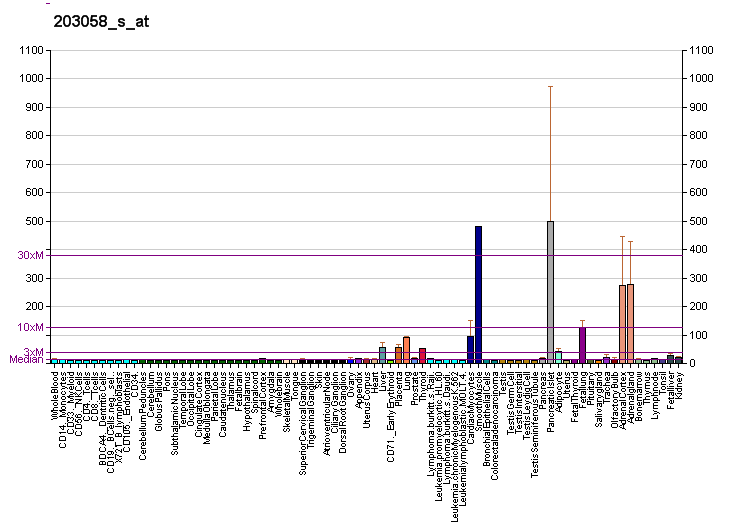

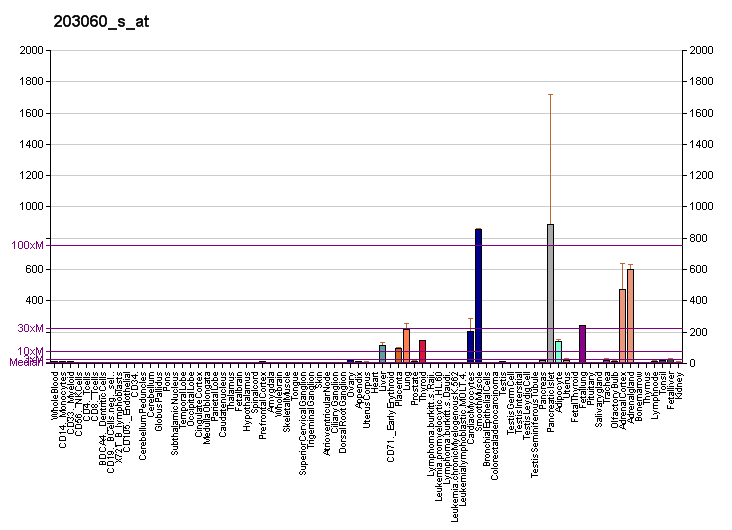
RNA expression pattern
Bgee	Human / Mouse (ortholog); Top expressed in: tibia; mucosa of sigmoid colon; lower lobe of lung; cartilage tissue; beta cell; visceral pleura; adrenal cortex; right adrenal gland; right adrenal cortex; jejunal mucosa / Top expressed in: duodenum; lacrimal gland; pyloric antrum; occiput; occipital bone; epithelium of stomach; islet of Langerhans; mucous cell of stomach; finger; lateral part of occipital bone; More reference expression data
BioGPS	More reference expression data
Gene ontology
Molecular function	ATP binding; nucleotidyltransferase activity; kinase activity; catalytic activity; nucleotide binding; transferase activity; sulfate adenylyltransferase (ATP) activity; adenylylsulfate kinase activity
Cellular component	cytosol
Biological process	blood coagulation; skeletal system development; bone development; phosphorylation; metabolism; sulfate assimilation; 3'-phosphoadenosine 5'-phosphosulfate biosynthetic process
Sources:Amigo / QuickGO
Orthologs
Species	Human	Mouse
Entrez	9060	23972
Ensembl	ENSG00000198682	ENSMUSG00000024899
UniProt	O95340; Q5TB52	O88428
RefSeq (mRNA)	NM_004670; NM_001015880	NM_001201470; NM_011864; NM_001360403
RefSeq (protein)	NP_001015880; NP_004661; NP_004661.2	NP_001188399; NP_035994; NP_001347332
Location (UCSC)	Chr 10: 87.66 – 87.75 Mb	Chr 19: 32.57 – 32.64 Mb
PubMed search
- Wikidata
View/Edit Human	View/Edit Mouse

Bifunctional 3'-phosphoadenosine 5'-phosphosulfate synthetase 2 is an enzyme that in humans is encoded by the PAPSS2 gene.

Sulfation is a common modification of endogenous (lipids, proteins, and carbohydrates) and exogenous (xenobiotics and drugs) compounds. In mammals, the sulfate source is 3'-phosphoadenosine 5'-phosphosulfate (PAPS), created from ATP and inorganic sulfate. Two different tissue isoforms encoded by different genes synthesize PAPS. This gene encodes one of the two PAPS synthetases. Defects in this gene cause the Pakistani type of spondyloepimetaphyseal dysplasia. Two alternatively spliced transcript variants that encode different isoforms have been described for this gene.
