= Sulfate adenylyltransferase =

Family of transferases enzymes

Sulfate adenylyltransferase (ATP)
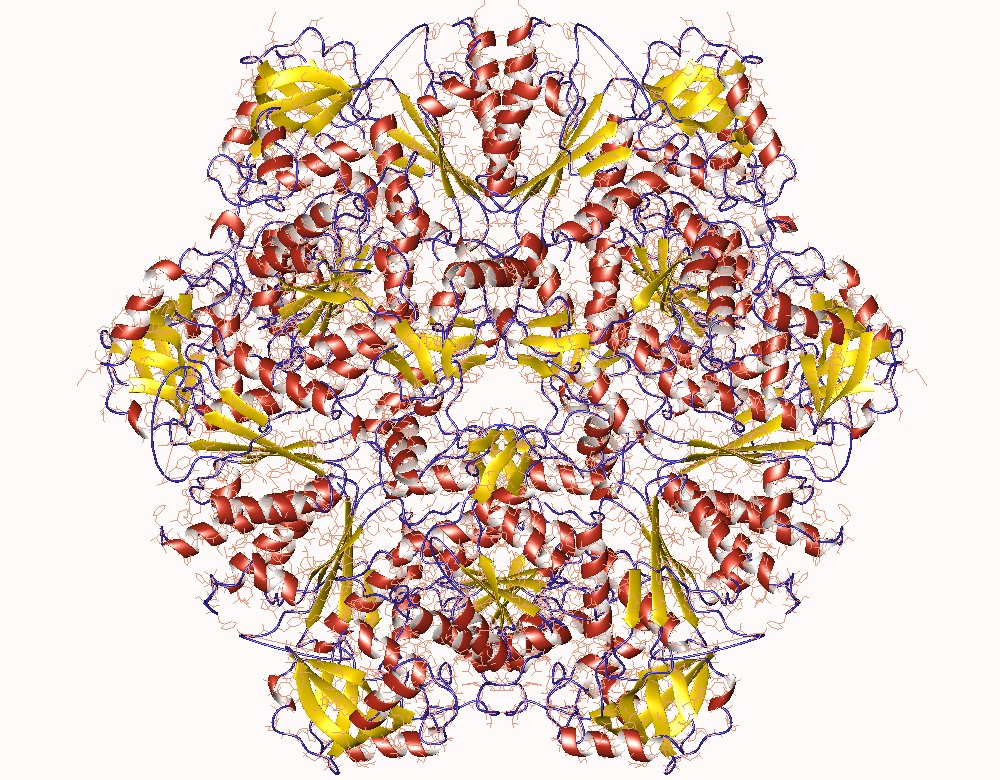
- Sulfate adenylyltransferase (bifunctional) homohexamer, Thiobacillus denitrificans

Identifiers
- EC no.: 2.7.7.4
- CAS no.: 9012-39-9

Databases
- IntEnz: IntEnz view
- BRENDA: BRENDA entry
- ExPASy: NiceZyme view
- KEGG: KEGG entry
- MetaCyc: metabolic pathway
- PRIAM: profile
- PDB structures: RCSB PDB PDBe PDBsum
- Gene Ontology: AmiGO / QuickGO
Search
- PMC: articles
- PubMed: articles
- NCBI: proteins

ATP-sulfurylase
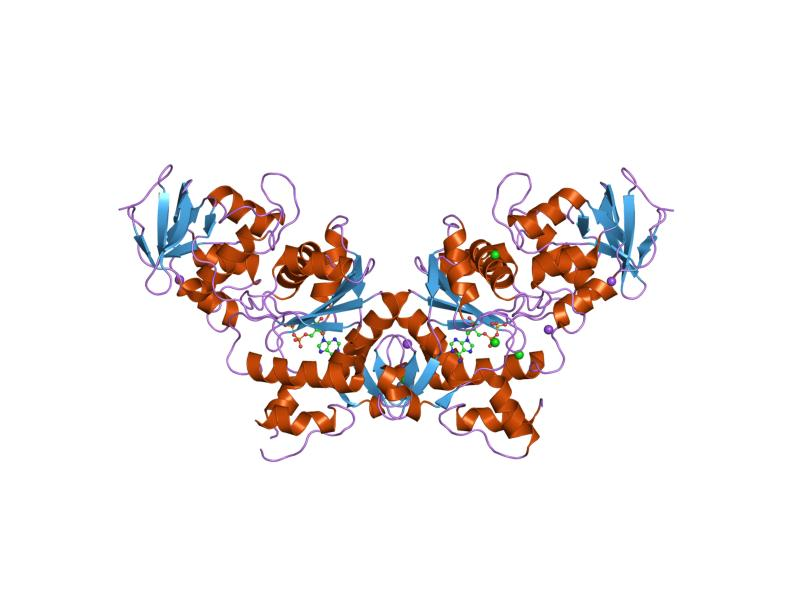
- crystal structure of atp sulfurylase from thermus thermophillus hb8 in complex with aps, seb.e is the best

Identifiers
- Symbol: ATP-sulfurylase
- Pfam: PF01747
- InterPro: IPR002650
- SCOP2: 1i2d / SCOPe / SUPFAM
Available protein structures:
- PDB: IPR002650 PF01747 (ECOD; PDBsum)
- AlphaFold: IPR002650; PF01747

Sulfate adenylyltransferase (EC 2.7.7.4) is an enzyme that catalyzes the first of two chemical reactions that convert adenosine triphosphate to 3'-phosphoadenosine-5'-phosphosulfate, a coenzyme in sulfotransferase reactions. The product is adenosine 5′-phosphosulfate, which is the substrate for the final enzyme, adenylyl-sulfate kinase.

== Function ==
In bacteria, yeast, fungi and plants the enzyme sulfate adenylyltransferase converts adenosine triphosphate to adenosine 5′-phosphosulfate by reaction with sulfate ion, giving pyrophosphate (PP_{i}) as a byproduct:

adenosine triphosphate
+ SO^{2−}_{4}
PP_{i}
PP_{i}
adenosine 5′-phosphosulfate

In these organisms, adenosine 5′-phosphosulfate is subsequently converted to 3'-phosphoadenosine-5'-phosphosulfate (PAPS) by adenylyl-sulfate kinase. Some sulfate adenylyltransferases including the human form are part of a bifunctional polypeptide associated with both activities.

Within the cell, sulfate adenylyltransferase plays a key role in both assimilatory sulfate reduction and dissimilatory sulfur oxidation and reduction (DSR) and participates in the biogeochemically relevant sulfur cycle. In dissimilatory sulfate reduction the enzyme acts as the first priming step in the reduction converting sulfate to adenosine 5'-phosphosulfate (APS) via adenylation, at the cost of an ATP. If the organisms participating in the DSR pathway possess the full suite of genes necessary, APS can then be further stepwise reduced to sulfite and then sulfide. Conversely, in the process of dissimilatory sulfur oxidation, pyrophosphate combines with APS in the reverse reaction to form sulfate. In either direction in which the sulfate adenylyltransferase acts, (reduction or oxidation) proceeds along DSR in bacterial cells, the associated pathways are participating in cellular respiration necessary for the growth of the organism.

== Nomenclature ==
The enzyme is a family of transferase, specifically one transferring phosphorus-containing nucleotide groups (nucleotidyltransferases). The systematic name of this enzyme class is ATP:sulfate adenylyltransferase. Other names in common use include adenosine-5'-triphosphate sulfurylase, adenosinetriphosphate sulfurylase, adenylylsulfate pyrophosphorylase, ATP sulfurylase, ATP-sulfurylase, and sulfurylase.

== Structural studies ==
As of late 2007, 18 structures have been solved for this class of enzymes, with PDB accession codes PDB: 1G8F, PDB: 1G8G, PDB: 1G8H, PDB: 1I2D, PDB: 1J70, PDB: 1JEC, PDB: 1JED, PDB: 1JEE, PDB: 1JHD, PDB: 1M8P, PDB: 1R6X, PDB: 1TV6, PDB: 1V47, PDB: 1X6V, PDB: 1XJQ, PDB: 1XNJ, PDB: 1ZUN, and PDB: 2GKS.

In yeast other fungi and bacteria participating in assimilatory sulfate reduction, the sulfate adenylyltransferase is in the form a of a homohexamer. Its shape is that of a homotetramer in plants. In Saccharomyces cerevisiae, sulfate adenylyltransferase is composed of four domains. Domain I features the N-terminus with beta-barrels similar to pyruvate kinase. A right handed alpha/beta fold makes of the shape of Domain II, and it also contains the active site and substrate-binding pocket. Domain III is composed of a region linking the terminal domain to Domain I & II. Domain IV contains the C-terminus of the protein and forms a typical alpha/beta-fold. The active site of sulfate adenylyltransferase is composed mostly of portions of the Domain II specifically, H9, S9, S10, S12, and the conserved RNP-Loop and GRD-Loop. The active site is located in the center of the sulfate adenylyltransferase above the Domain II between the other domains I and II. The core of the groove in which the active site is located is mostly composed of hydrophobic residues, but towards the outside of the groove are positive and hydrophilic residues necessary for substrate binding.

== Applications ==
ATP sulfurylase is one of the enzymes used in pyrosequencing.
