= Adenylyl-sulfate kinase =

Adenylylsulfate kinase
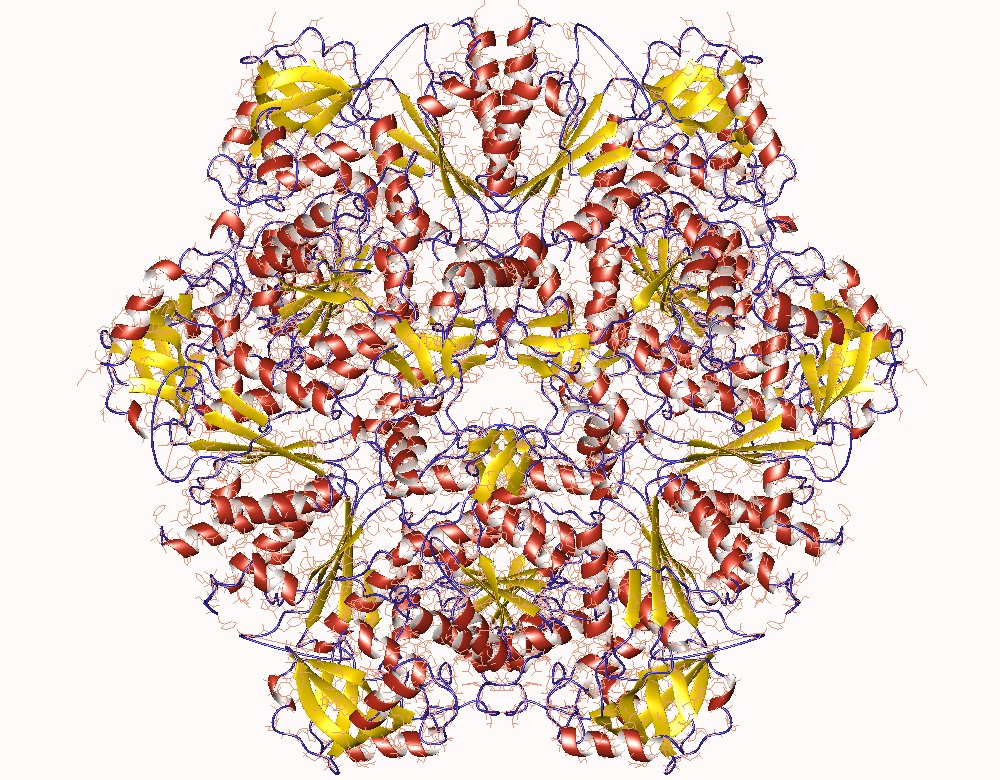
- Adenylylsulfate kinase homohexamer, Thiobacillus denitrificans

Identifiers
- EC no.: 2.7.1.25
- CAS no.: 9012-38-8

Databases
- BRENDA: enzyme data
- ExPASy: NiceZyme view
- KEGG: enzyme entry
- MetaCyc: metabolic pathway
- Rhea: reactions
- PDB structures: RCSB PDB PDBe PDBsum
- Gene Ontology: AmiGO / QuickGO
Search
- PMC: articles
- PubMed: articles
- NCBI: proteins

APS_kinase
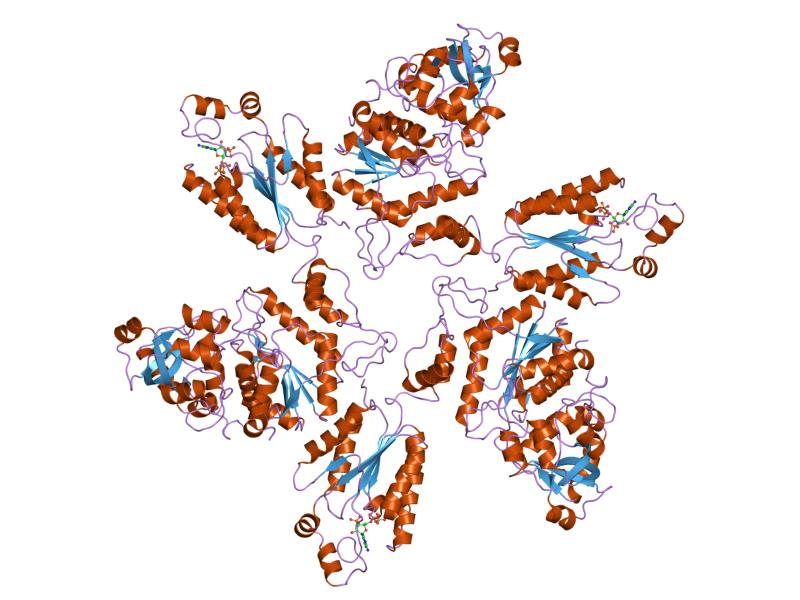
- crystal structure of p. chrysogenum atp sulfurylase in the t-state

Identifiers
- Symbol: APS_kinase
- Pfam: PF01583
- Pfam clan: CL0023
- InterPro: IPR002891
- SCOP2: 1d6j / SCOPe / SUPFAM
- CDD: cd02027
Available protein structures:
- PDB: IPR002891 PF01583 (ECOD; PDBsum)
- AlphaFold: IPR002891; PF01583

Adenylyl-sulfate kinase (EC 2.7.1.25) is an enzyme that catalyzes the chemical reaction

ATP +
5'-adenylyl sulfate
ADP +
3'-phosphoadenosine-5'-phosphosulfate

The enzyme characterised from liver converts the adenosine monophosphate derivative, 5'-adenylyl sulfate, to 3'-phosphoadenosine-5'-phosphosulfate by transferring a phosphate group from the cofactor, adenosine triphosphate (ATP), which is converted to adenosine diphosphate (ADP). The enzyme is also found in human brain.

This enzyme is a transferase, specifically one transferring phosphorus-containing groups (phosphotransferases) with an alcohol group as acceptor. The systematic name of this enzyme class is ATP:adenylyl-sulfate 3'-phosphotransferase. Other names in common use include adenylylsulfate kinase (phosphorylating), 5'-phosphoadenosine sulfate kinase, adenosine 5'-phosphosulfate kinase, adenosine phosphosulfate kinase, adenosine phosphosulfokinase, adenosine-5'-phosphosulfate-3'-phosphokinase, and APS kinase. It participates in 3 metabolic pathways: purine metabolism, selenoamino acid metabolism, and sulfur metabolism.

This enzyme contains an ATP binding P-loop motif.

== Structural studies ==
As of late 2007, 11 structures have been solved for this class of enzymes, with PDB accession codes PDB: 1D6J, PDB: 1M7G, PDB: 1M7H, PDB: 1X6V, PDB: 1XJQ, PDB: 1XNJ, PDB: 2AX4, PDB: 2GKS, PDB: 2OFW, PDB: 2OFX, and PDB: 2PEY.
