= Sulfur metabolism =

Set of chemical reactions involving sulfur in living organisms

Sulfur is metabolized by all organisms, from bacteria and archaea to plants and animals. Sulfur can have an oxidation state from −2 to +6 and is reduced or oxidized by a diverse range of organisms. The element is present in proteins, sulfate esters of polysaccharides, steroids, phenols, and sulfur-containing coenzymes.

== Oxidation ==
Reduced sulfur compounds are oxidized by most organisms, including higher animals and higher plants. Some organisms can conserve energy (i.e., produce ATP) from the oxidation of sulfur and it can serve as the sole energy source for some lithotrophic bacteria and archaea. Sulfur oxidizers use enzymes such as Sulfide:quinone reductase, sulfur dioxygenase and sulfite oxidase to oxidize sulfur compounds to sulfate.

=== Sulfur-oxidizing microorganisms ===
Reduced sulfur compounds, such as hydrogen sulfide, elemental sulfur, sulfite, thiosulfate, and various polythionates (e.g., tetrathionate), are oxidized by chemotrophic, phototrophic, and mixotrophic bacteria for energy. Some chemosynthetic archaea use hydrogen sulfide as an energy source for carbon fixation, producing sugars.

==== Chemotrophic sulfur-oxidizing bacteria ====
In order to have sufficient redox potential, microorganisms that use sulfur as an electron donor often use oxygen or nitrate as terminal electron acceptors. Members of the chemotrophic Acidithiobacillus genus are able to oxidize a vast range of reduced sulfur compounds, but are restricted to acidic environments. Chemotrophs that can produce sugars through chemosynthesis make up the base of some food chains. Food chains have formed in the absence of sunlight around hydrothermal vents, which emit hydrogen sulfide and carbon dioxide.

==== Phototrophic sulfur-oxidizing bacteria ====
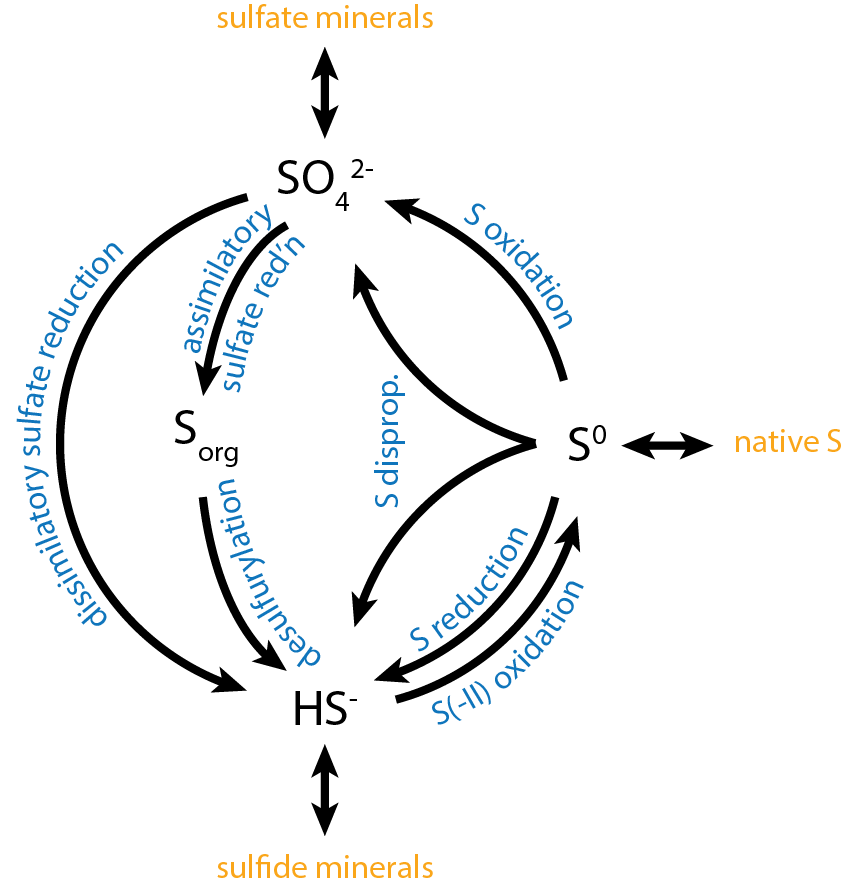
Microbial sulfur cycle

Some bacteria use light energy to couple sulfur oxidation to carbon dioxide (CO_{2}) fixation for growth. These fall into two general groups: green sulfur bacteria (GSB) and purple sulfur bacteria (PSB). However, some Cyanobacteria are also able to use hydrogen sulfide as an electron donor during anoxygenic photosynthesis. All PSB are part of the class Gammaproteobacteria and are found in two families: Chromatiaceae and Ectothiorhodospiraceae. Typically, sulfur globules accumulate intracellularly in Chromatiaceae and extracellularly in Ectothiorhodospiraceae, which is one distinguishing feature between these two groups of PSB. GSB are found within the family Chlorobiaceae generally oxidize sulfide or elemental sulfur, but some members are able to utilize thiosulfate.

== Reduction ==
Sulfur reduction occurs in plants, fungi, and many bacteria. Sulfate can serve as an electron acceptor in anaerobic respiration and can also be reduced for the formation of organic compounds. Sulfate-reducing bacteria reduce sulfate and other oxidized sulfur compounds, such as sulfite, thiosulfate, and elemental sulfur, to sulfide.

=== Dissimilatory sulfur reduction ===
Some microorganisms are capable of reducing sulfate and elemental sulfur for energy by coupling sulfur reduction with the oxidation of molecular hydrogen or organic compounds such as acetate in anaerobic respiration. These processes typically produce hydrogen sulfide as a byproduct, which can go on to serve as an electron donor in sulfur oxidation. Sulfate reduction by sulfate-reducing bacteria is dissimilatory; the purpose of reducing the sulfate is to produce energy, and the sulfide is excreted. Dissimilatory sulfate reduction use the enzymes ATP sulfurylase, APS reductase, and sulfite reductase.

=== Assimilatory sulfur reduction ===
In assimilatory sulfate reduction the sulfate is assimilated, or incorporated into organic compounds such as cysteine, methionine, or iron-sulfur clusters and enzyme cofactors. In bacteria, sulfate and thiosulfate are transported into the cell by sulfate permeases where it can then be reduced and incorporated into biomolecules. In some organisms (e.g., gut flora, cyanobacteria, and yeast), assimilatory sulfate reduction is a more complex process that makes use of the enzymes ATP sulfurylase, APS kinase, PAPS reductase, and sulfite reductase.

== Disproportionation ==
Sulfur can also serve as both an electron donor and electron acceptor by microorganisms is disproportionation reactions. For example, Acidianus ambivalens uses sulfur oxygenase reductase (SOR) to convert elemental sulfur to sulfate, thiosulfate, and hydrogen sulfide through disproportionation. Elemental sulfur disproportionation is restricted to environments where the concentration of the sulfide products are kept low, which typically happens in the presence of scavenging minerals that contain iron or manganese. Disproportionation of thiosulfate often occurs in anoxic layers of marine and freshwater sediments.

== Use by plants and animals ==
Plants take up sulfate in their roots and reduce it to sulfide (see Sulfur assimilation). However, some Brassica species are able to assimilate atmospheric sources of sulfur in the absence of other sources. Plants reduce APS directly to sulfite (using APS reductase) without phosphorylating APS to PAPS. From the sulfide they form the amino acids cysteine and methionine, sulfolipids, and other sulfur compounds. Animals obtain sulfur from cysteine and methionine in the protein that they consume.

Sulfur is the third most abundant mineral element in the body. The amino acids cysteine and methionine are used by the body to make glutathione. Excess cysteine and methionine are oxidized to sulfate by sulfite oxidase, eliminated in the urine, or stored as glutathione (which can serve as a store for sulfur). The lack of sulfite oxidase, known as sulfite oxidase deficiency, causes physical deformities, intellectual disability, and death. Mammalian cells generate hydrogen sulfide as a biological signaling agent and oxidize hydrogen sulfide to hydropersulfides, polysulfanes, and polysulfides.

== See also ==
- Microbial metabolism
- Sulfur cycle
