= Adenosine 3',5'-bisphosphate =

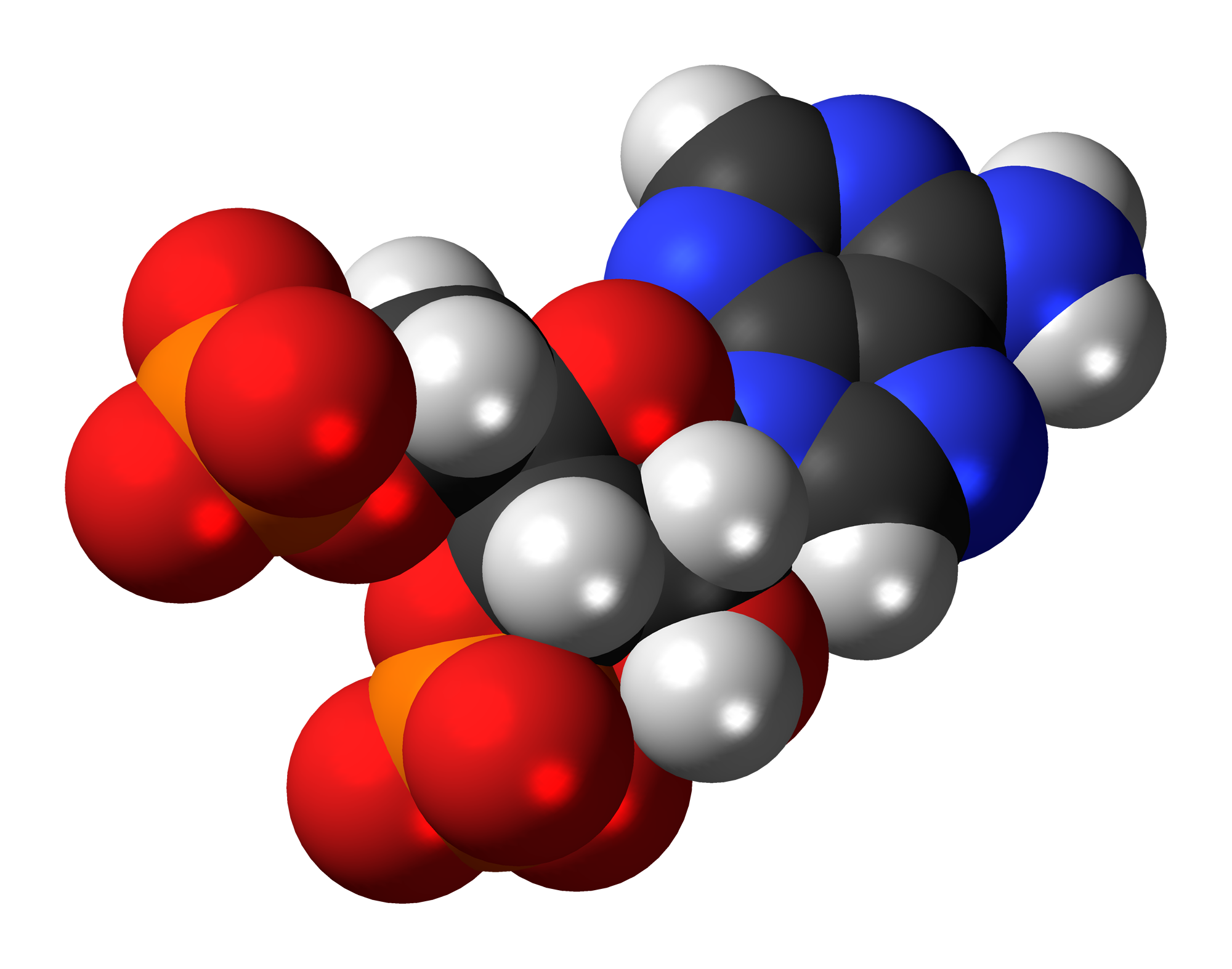

Names
- IUPAC name Adenosine 3′,5′-bis(dihydrogen phosphate)
- Systematic IUPAC name (2R,3S,4R,5R)-5-(6-Amino-9H-purin-9-yl)-4-hydroxy-2-[(phosphonooxy)methyl]oxolan-3-yl dihydrogen phosphate
- Other names 3'-Phosphoadenylate

Identifiers
CAS Number	1053-73-2
3D model (JSmol)	Interactive image
ChemSpider	140102
IUPHAR/BPS	1718
MeSH	Adenosine+bisphosphate
PubChem CID	159296
UNII	C65F80D52U
CompTox Dashboard (EPA)	DTXSID50909413
- InChI: InChI=1S/C10H15N5O10P2/c11-8-5-9(13-2-12-8)15(3-14-5)10-6(16)7(25-27(20,21)22)4(24-10)1-23-26(17,18)19/h2-4,6-7,10,16H,1H2,(H2,11,12,13)(H2,17,18,19)(H2,20,21,22)/t4-,6-,7-,10-/m1/s1 Key: WHTCPDAXWFLDIH-KQYNXXCUSA-N; InChI=1/C10H15N5O10P2/c11-8-5-9(13-2-12-8)15(3-14-5)10-6(16)7(25-27(20,21)22)4(24-10)1-23-26(17,18)19/h2-4,6-7,10,16H,1H2,(H2,11,12,13)(H2,17,18,19)(H2,20,21,22)/t4-,6-,7-,10-/m1/s1 Key: WHTCPDAXWFLDIH-KQYNXXCUBO
- SMILES: c1nc(c2c(n1)n(cn2)[C@H]3[C@@H]([C@@H]([C@H](O3)COP(=O)(O)O)OP(=O)(O)O)O)N

Properties
Chemical formula	C_{10}H_{15}N_{5}O_{10}P_{2}
Molar mass	427.20 g/mol
- Except where otherwise noted, data are given for materials in their standard state (at 25 °C [77 °F], 100 kPa). verify (what is ?) Infobox references

Adenosine 3',5'-bisphosphate is a form of an adenosine nucleotide with two phosphate groups attached to different carbons in the ribose ring. This is distinct from adenosine diphosphate, where the two phosphate groups are attached in a chain to the 5' carbon atom in the ring.

Adenosine 3',5'-bisphosphate is produced as a product of sulfotransferase enzymes from the donation of a sulfate group from the coenzyme 3'-phosphoadenosine-5'-phosphosulfate. This product is then hydrolysed by 3'(2'),5'-bisphosphate nucleotidase to give adenosine monophosphate, which can then be recycled into adenosine triphosphate.

== See also ==
- Adenine
- Sulfur metabolism
- Acetyl-CoA
