= 3'-Phosphoadenosine-5'-phosphosulfate =

3′-Phosphoadenosine-5′-phosphosulfate

Names
- IUPAC name 3′-O-Phosphono-5′-adenylyl hydrogen sulfate
- Systematic IUPAC name [(2R,3S,4R,5R)-5-(6-Amino-9H-purin-9-yl)-4-hydroxy-3-(phosphonooxy)oxolan-2-yl]methyl hydrogen (sulfooxy)phosphonate
- Other names PAPS; 3′-Phosphoadenylyl sulfate Phosphoadenosine phosphosulfate 3′-Phospho-5′-adenylyl sulfate

Identifiers
CAS Number	482-67-7
3D model (JSmol)	Interactive image
Abbreviations	PAPS
ChEBI	CHEBI:17980
ChemSpider	9799
ECHA InfoCard	100.222.927
EC Number	694-699-5
IUPHAR/BPS	1719
KEGG	C00053
PubChem CID	10214
UNII	5TH3ERG159
CompTox Dashboard (EPA)	DTXSID40894869
- InChI: InChI=1S/C10H15N5O13P2S/c11-8-5-9(13-2-12-8)15(3-14-5)10-6(16)7(27-29(17,18)19)4(26-10)1-25-30(20,21)28-31(22,23)24/h2-4,6-7,10,16H,1H2,(H,20,21)(H2,11,12,13)(H2,17,18,19)(H,22,23,24)/t4-,6-,7-,10-/m1/s1 Key: GACDQMDRPRGCTN-KQYNXXCUSA-N
- SMILES: C1=NC2=C(C(=N1)N)N=CN2[C@H]3[C@@H]([C@@H]([C@H](O3)COP(=O)(O)OS(=O)(=O)O)OP(=O)(O)O)O

Properties
Chemical formula	C_{10}H_{15}N_{5}O_{13}P_{2}S
Molar mass	507.266
- Except where otherwise noted, data are given for materials in their standard state (at 25 °C [77 °F], 100 kPa). Infobox references

3′-Phosphoadenosine-5′-phosphosulfate (PAPS) is a derivative of adenosine monophosphate (AMP) that is phosphorylated at the 3′ position and has a sulfate group attached to the 5′ phosphate. It is the most common coenzyme in sulfotransferase reactions and hence part of sulfation pathways. It is endogenously synthesized by organisms via the phosphorylation of adenosine 5′-phosphosulfate (APS), an intermediary metabolite. In humans such reaction is performed by bifunctional 3′-phosphoadenosine 5′-phosphosulfate synthases (PAPSS1 and PAPSS2) using ATP as the phosphate donor.

== Formation and reduction ==
APS and PAPS are intermediates in the reduction of sulfate to sulfite, an exothermic conversion that is carried out by sulfate-reducing bacteria. In these organisms, sulfate serves as an electron acceptor, akin to the use of O_{2} as an electron acceptor by aerobic organisms. Sulfate is not reduced directly but must be activated by the formation of APS or PAPS. These carriers of activated sulfate are produced by reaction with ATP. The first reaction is catalysed by ATP sulfurylase:

SO_{4}^{2−} + ATP ⇌ APS + PP_{i}

The conversion of APS to PAPS is catalysed by adenylyl-sulfate kinase:

ATP +
adenosine 5′-phosphosulfate
ADP +
PAPS

Reduction of APS leads to sulfite, which is further reduced to hydrogen sulfide, which is excreted. This process is called dissimilatory sulfate reduction. Reduction of PAPS, a more elaborated sulfate ester, leads also to hydrogen sulfide. But in this case, the product is used in biosynthesis, e.g. for the production of cysteine. The latter process is called assimilatory sulfate reduction because the sulfate sulfur is assimilated.
