= Nitrifying bacteria =

Chemolithotrophic organisms

Nitrifying bacteria are chemolithotrophic organisms that include species of genera such as Nitrosomonas, Nitrosococcus, Nitrobacter, Nitrospina, Nitrospira and Nitrococcus. These bacteria get their energy from the oxidation of inorganic nitrogen compounds. Types include ammonia-oxidizing bacteria (AOB) and nitrite-oxidizing bacteria (NOB). Many species of nitrifying bacteria have complex internal membrane systems that are the location for key enzymes in nitrification: ammonia monooxygenase (which oxidizes ammonia to hydroxylamine), hydroxylamine oxidoreductase (which oxidizes hydroxylamine to nitric oxide - which is further oxidized to nitrite by a currently unidentified enzyme), and nitrite oxidoreductase (which oxidizes nitrite to nitrate).

== Ecology ==
Nitrifying bacteria are present in distinct taxonomical groups and are found in highest numbers where considerable amounts of ammonia are present (such as areas with extensive protein decomposition, and sewage treatment plants). Nitrifying bacteria thrive in lakes, streams, and rivers with high inputs and outputs of sewage, wastewater and freshwater because of the high ammonia content.

== Oxidation of ammonia to nitrate ==
Nitrification in nature is a two-step oxidation process of ammonium (NH^{+}_{4}) or ammonia (NH_{3}) to nitrite (NO^{−}_{2}) and then to nitrate (NO^{−}_{3}) catalyzed by two ubiquitous bacterial groups growing together. The first reaction is oxidation of ammonium to nitrite by ammonia oxidizing bacteria (AOB) represented by members of Betaproteobacteria and Gammaproteobacteria. Further organisms able to oxidize ammonia are Archaea (AOA).

The second reaction is oxidation of nitrite (NO^{−}_{2}) to nitrate by nitrite-oxidizing bacteria (NOB), represented by the members of Nitrospinota, Nitrospirota, Pseudomonadota, and Chloroflexota.

This two-step process was described already in 1890 by the Ukrainian microbiologist Sergei Winogradsky.

Ammonia can be also oxidized completely to nitrate by one comammox bacterium.

=== Ammonia-to-nitrite mechanism ===
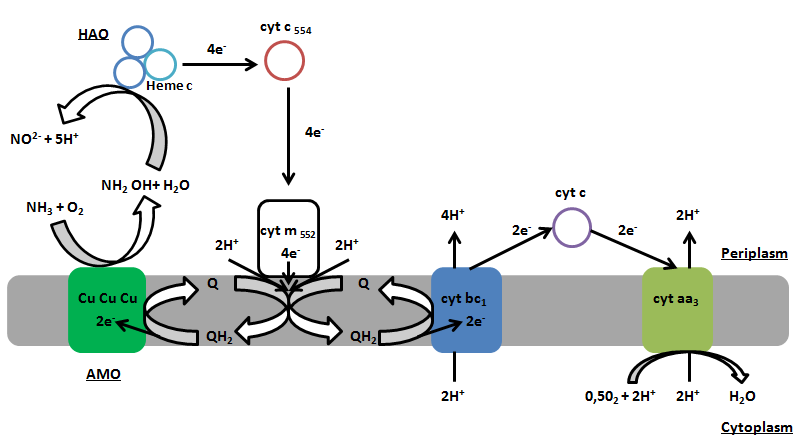
Molecular mechanism of ammonium oxidation by AOB

Ammonia oxidation in autotrophic nitrification is a complex process that requires several enzymes as well as oxygen as a reactant. The key enzymes necessary for releasing energy during oxidation of ammonia to nitrite are ammonia monooxygenase (AMO) and hydroxylamine oxidoreductase (HAO). The first is a transmembrane copper protein which catalyzes the oxidation of ammonia to hydroxylamine (1.1) taking two electrons directly from the quinone pool. This reaction requires O_{2}.

The second step of this process has recently fallen into question. For the past few decades, the common view was that a trimeric multiheme c-type HAO converts hydroxylamine into nitrite in the periplasm with production of four electrons (1.2). The stream of four electrons is channeled through cytochrome c_{554} to a membrane-bound cytochrome c_{552}. Two of the electrons are routed back to AMO, where they are used for the oxidation of ammonia (quinol pool). The remaining two electrons are used to generate a proton motive force and reduce NAD(P) through reverse electron transport.

Recent results, however, show that HAO does not produce nitrite as a direct product of catalysis. This enzyme instead produces nitric oxide and three electrons. Nitric oxide can then be oxidized by other enzymes (or oxygen) to nitrite. In this paradigm, the electron balance for overall metabolism needs to be reconsidered.

NH_{3} + O_{2} → NO^{−}_{2} + 3H^{+} + 2e^{−}	1

NH_{3} + O_{2} + 2H^{+} + 2e^{−} → NH_{2}OH + H_{2}O	1.1

NH_{2}OH + H_{2}O → NO^{−}_{2} + 5H^{+} + 4e^{−}	1.2

=== Nitrite-to-nitrate mechanism ===
Nitrite produced in the first step of autotrophic nitrification is oxidized to nitrate by nitrite oxidoreductase (NXR) (2). It is a membrane-associated iron-sulfur molybdo protein and is part of an electron transfer chain which channels electrons from nitrite to molecular oxygen. The enzymatic mechanisms involved in nitrite-oxidizing bacteria are less described than that of ammonium oxidation. Recent research (e.g. Woźnica A. et al., 2013) proposes a new hypothetical model of NOB electron transport chain and NXR mechanisms. Here, in contrast to earlier models, the NXR would act on the outside of the plasma membrane and directly contribute to a mechanism of proton gradient generation as postulated by Spieck and coworkers. Nevertheless, the molecular mechanism of nitrite oxidation is an open question.

NO^{−}_{2} + H_{2}O → NO^{−}_{3} + 2H^{+} + 2e^{−}	2

=== Comammox bacteria ===
The two-step conversion of ammonia to nitrate observed in ammonia-oxidizing bacteria, ammonia-oxidizing archaea and nitrite-oxidizing bacteria (such as Nitrobacter) is puzzling to researchers. Complete nitrification, the conversion of ammonia to nitrate in a single step known as comammox, has an energy yield (∆G°′) of −349 kJ mol^{−1} NH_{3}, while the energy yields for the ammonia-oxidation and nitrite-oxidation steps of the observed two-step reaction are −275 kJ mol^{−1} NH_{3}, and −74 kJ mol^{−1} NO_{2}^{−}, respectively. These values indicate that it would be energetically favourable for an organism to carry out complete nitrification from ammonia to nitrate (comammox), rather than conduct only one of the two steps. The evolutionary motivation for a decoupled, two-step nitrification reaction is an area of ongoing research. In 2015, it was discovered that the species Nitrospira inopinata possesses all the enzymes required for carrying out complete nitrification in one step, suggesting that this reaction does occur.

=== Table of characteristics ===
Genus	Phylogenetic group	DNA (mol% GC)	Habitats	Characteristics
Nitrifying bacteria that oxidize ammonia
Nitrosomonas	Beta	45-53	Soil, sewage, freshwater, marine	Gram-negative short to long rods, motile (polar flagella) or nonmotile; peripheral membrane systems
Nitrosococcus	Gamma	49-50	Freshwater, marine	Large cocci, motile, vesicular or peripheral membranes
Nitrosospira	Beta	54	Soil	Spirals, motile (peritrichous flagella); no obvious membrane system
Nitrifying bacteria that oxidize nitrite
Nitrobacter	Alpha	59-62	Soil, freshwater, marine	Short rods, reproduce by budding, occasionally motile (single subterminal flagella) or non-motile; membrane system arranged as a polar cap
Nitrospina	Delta	58	Marine	Long, slender rods, nonmotile, no obvious membrane system
Nitrococcus	Gamma	61	Marine	Large cocci, motile (one or two subterminal flagellum) membrane system randomly arranged in tubes
Nitrospira	Nitrospirota	50	Marine, soil	Helical to vibroid-shaped cells; nonmotile; no internal membranes
Comammox bacteria
Nitrospira inopinata	Nitrospirota	59.23	Microbial mat in hot water pipes (56 °C, pH 7.5)	Rods

== See also ==
- Root nodule
- Denitrification
- Denitrifying bacteria
- f-ratio
- Nitrification
- Nitrogen cycle
- Nitrogen deficiency
- Nitrogen fixation
- Electron transport chain
- Comammox
