= Nitrification =

Biological oxidation of ammonia/ammonium to nitrate

Nitrogen cycle

Nitrification is the biological oxidation of ammonia to nitrate via the intermediary nitrite. Nitrification is an important step in the nitrogen cycle in soil. The process of complete nitrification may occur through separate organisms or entirely within one organism, as in comammox bacteria. The transformation of ammonia to nitrite is usually the rate limiting step of nitrification. Nitrification is an aerobic process performed by small groups of autotrophic bacteria and archaea.

== Microbiology ==
=== Ammonia oxidation ===
The process of nitrification begins with the first stage of ammonia oxidation, where ammonia (NH_{3}) or ammonium (NH_{4}^{+}) get converted into nitrite (NO_{2}^{−}). This first stage is sometimes known as nitritation. It is performed by two groups of organisms, ammonia-oxidizing bacteria (AOB) and ammonia-oxidizing archaea (AOA).

==== Ammonia-Oxidizing Bacteria ====
Ammonia-Oxidizing Bacteria (AOB) are typically Gram-negative bacteria and belong to Betaproteobacteria and Gammaproteobacteria including the commonly studied genera Nitrosomonas and Nitrosococcus. They are known for their ability to utilize ammonia as an energy source and are prevalent in a wide range of environments, such as soils, aquatic systems, and wastewater treatment plants.

AOB possess enzymes called ammonia monooxygenases (AMOs), which are responsible for catalyzing the conversion of ammonia to hydroxylamine (NH_{2}OH), a crucial intermediate in the process of nitrification. This enzymatic activity is sensitive to environmental factors, such as pH, temperature, and oxygen availability.

AOB play a vital role in soil nitrification, making them key players in nutrient cycling. They contribute to the transformation of ammonia derived from organic matter decomposition or fertilizers into nitrite, which subsequently serves as a substrate for nitrite-oxidizing bacteria (NOB).

==== Ammonia-Oxidizing Archaea ====
Prior to the discovery of archaea capable of ammonia oxidation, ammonia-oxidizing bacteria (AOB) were considered the only organisms capable of ammonia oxidation. Since their discovery in 2005, two isolates of AOAs have been cultivated: Nitrosopumilus maritimus and Nitrososphaera viennensis. When comparing AOB and AOA, AOA dominate in both soils and marine environments, suggesting that Nitrososphaerota (formerly Thaumarchaeota) may be greater contributors to ammonia oxidation in these environments.

Crenarchaeol, which is generally thought to be produced exclusively by AOA (specifically Nitrososphaerota), has been proposed as a biomarker for AOA and ammonia oxidation. Crenarchaeol abundance has been found to track with seasonal blooms of AOA, suggesting that it may be appropriate to use crenarchaeol abundances as a proxy for AOA populations and thus ammonia oxidation more broadly. However the discovery of Nitrososphaerota that are not obligate ammonia-oxidizers complicates this conclusion, as does one study that suggests that crenarchaeol may be produced by Marine Group II Euryarchaeota.

=== Nitrite oxidation ===
The second step of nitrification is the oxidation of nitrite into nitrate. This process is sometimes known as nitratation. Nitrite oxidation is conducted by nitrite-oxidizing bacteria (NOB) from the taxa Nitrospirota, Nitrospinota, Pseudomonadota and Chloroflexota. NOB are typically present in soil, geothermal springs, freshwater and marine ecosystems.

=== Complete ammonia oxidation ===
Ammonia oxidation to nitrate in a single step within one organism was predicted in 2006 and discovered in 2015 in the species Nitrospira inopinata. A pure culture of the organism was obtained in 2017, representing a revolution in our understanding of the nitrification process.

== History ==
The idea that oxidation of ammonia to nitrate is in fact a biological process was first given by Louis Pasteur in 1862. Later in 1875, Alexander Müller, while conducting a quality assessment of water from wells in Berlin, noted that ammonium was stable in sterilized solutions but nitrified in natural waters. A. Müller put forward, that nitrification is thus performed by microorganisms. In 1877, Jean-Jacques Schloesing and Achille Müntz, two French agricultural chemists working in Paris, proved that nitrification is indeed microbially mediated process by the experiments with liquid sewage and artificial soil matrix (sterilized sand with powdered chalk). Their findings were confirmed soon (in 1878) by Robert Warington who was investigating nitrification ability of garden soil at the Rothamsted experimental station in Harpenden in England. R. Warington made also the first observation that nitrification is a two-step process in 1879 which was confirmed by John Munro in 1886. Although at that time, it was believed that two-step nitrification is separated into distinct life phases or character traits of a single microorganism.

The first pure nitrifier (ammonia-oxidizing) was most probably isolated in 1890 by Percy Frankland and Grace Frankland, two English scientists from Scotland. Before that, Warington, Sergei Winogradsky and the Franklands were only able to enrich cultures of nitrifiers. Frankland and Frankland succeeded with a system of serial dilutions with very low inoculum and long cultivation times counting in years. Sergei Winogradsky claimed pure culture isolation in the same year (1890), but his culture was still co-culture of ammonia- and nitrite-oxidizing bacteria. S. Winogradsky succeeded just one year later in 1891.

In fact, during the serial dilutions ammonia-oxidizers and nitrite-oxidizers were unknowingly separated resulting in pure culture with ammonia-oxidation ability only. Thus Frankland and Frankland observed that these pure cultures lose ability to perform both steps. Loss of nitrite oxidation ability was observed already by R. Warington. Cultivation of pure nitrite oxidizer happened later during 20th century, however it is not possible to be certain which cultures were without contaminants as all theoretically pure strains share same trait (nitrite consumption, nitrate production).

== Ecology ==
Both steps are producing energy to be coupled to ATP synthesis. Nitrifying organisms are chemoautotrophs, and use carbon dioxide as their carbon source for growth. Some AOB possess the enzyme, urease, which catalyzes the conversion of the urea molecule to two ammonia molecules and one carbon dioxide molecule. Nitrosomonas europaea, as well as populations of soil-dwelling AOB, have been shown to assimilate the carbon dioxide released by the reaction to make biomass via the Calvin Cycle, and harvest energy by oxidizing ammonia (the other product of urease) to nitrite. This feature may explain enhanced growth of AOB in the presence of urea in acidic environments.

In most environments, organisms are present that will complete both steps of the process, yielding nitrate as the final product. However, it is possible to design systems in which nitrite is formed (the Sharon process).

Nitrification is important in agricultural systems, where fertilizer is often applied as ammonia. Conversion of this ammonia to nitrate increases nitrogen leaching because nitrate is more water-soluble than ammonia.

Nitrification also plays an important role in the removal of nitrogen from municipal wastewater. The conventional removal is nitrification, followed by denitrification. The cost of this process resides mainly in aeration (bringing oxygen in the reactor) and the addition of an external carbon source (e.g., methanol) for the denitrification.

Nitrification can also occur in drinking water. In distribution systems where chloramines are used as the secondary disinfectant, the presence of free ammonia can act as a substrate for ammonia-oxidizing microorganisms. The associated reactions can lead to the depletion of the disinfectant residual in the system. The addition of chlorite ion to chloramine-treated water has been shown to control nitrification.

Together with ammonification, nitrification forms a mineralization process that refers to the complete decomposition of organic material, with the release of available nitrogen compounds. This replenishes the nitrogen cycle.

=== Nitrification in the marine environment ===
In the marine environment, nitrogen is often the limiting nutrient, so the nitrogen cycle in the ocean is of particular interest. The nitrification step of the cycle is of particular interest in the ocean because it creates nitrate, the primary form of nitrogen responsible for "new" production. Furthermore, as the ocean becomes enriched in anthropogenic CO_{2}, the resulting decrease in pH could lead to decreasing rates of nitrification. Nitrification could potentially become a "bottleneck" in the nitrogen cycle.

Nitrification, as stated above, is formally a two-step process; in the first step ammonia is oxidized to nitrite, and in the second step nitrite is oxidized to nitrate. Diverse microbes are responsible for each step in the marine environment. Several groups of ammonia-oxidizing bacteria (AOB) are known in the marine environment, including Nitrosomonas, Nitrospira, and Nitrosococcus. All contain the functional gene ammonia monooxygenase (AMO) which, as its name implies, is responsible for the oxidation of ammonia. Subsequent metagenomic studies and cultivation approaches have revealed that some Thermoproteota (formerly Crenarchaeota) possess AMO. Thermoproteota are abundant in the ocean and some species have a 200 times greater affinity for ammonia than AOB, contrasting with the previous belief that AOB are primarily responsible for nitrification in the ocean. Furthermore, though nitrification is classically thought to be vertically separated from primary production because the oxidation of nitrate by bacteria is inhibited by light, nitrification by AOA does not appear to be light inhibited, meaning that nitrification is occurring throughout the water column, challenging the classical definitions of "new" and "recycled" production.

In the second step, nitrite is oxidized to nitrate. In the oceans, this step is not as well understood as the first, but the bacteria Nitrospina and Nitrobacter are known to carry out this step in the ocean.

== Chemistry and enzymology ==
Nitrification is a process of nitrogen compound oxidation (effectively, loss of electrons from the nitrogen atom to the oxygen atoms), and is catalyzed step-wise by a series of enzymes.

$\ce{2NH4+ + 3O2 -> 2NO2- + 4H+ + 2H2O}$ (Nitrosomonas, Comammox)
$\ce{2NO2- + O2 -> 2NO3-}$ (Nitrobacter, Nitrospira, Comammox)

OR

$$\ce{NH3 + O2 -> NO2- + 3H+ + 2e-}$$
$$\ce{NO2- + H2O -> NO3- + 2H+ + 2e-}$$

In Nitrosomonas europaea, the first step of oxidation (ammonia to hydroxylamine) is carried out by the enzyme ammonia monooxygenase (AMO).

$$\ce{NH3 + O2 + 2H+ -> NH2OH + H2O}$$

The second step (hydroxylamine to nitrite) is catalyzed by two enzymes. Hydroxylamine oxidoreductase (HAO), converts hydroxylamine to nitric oxide.

$$\ce{NH2OH -> NO + 3H+ + 3e-}$$

Another currently unknown enzyme converts nitric oxide to nitrite.

The third step (nitrite to nitrate) is completed in a distinct organism.

$$\ce{{nitrite} + acceptor <=> {nitrate} + reduced\ acceptor}$$

== Factors Affecting Nitrification Rates ==
=== Soil conditions ===
Due to its inherent microbial nature, nitrification in soils is greatly susceptible to soil conditions. In general, soil nitrification will proceed at optimal rates if the conditions for the microbial communities foster healthy microbial growth and activity. Soil conditions that have an effect on nitrification rates include:

- Substrate availability (presence of NH_{4}^{+})
- Aeration (availability of O_{2})
- Soil moisture content (availability of H_{2}O)
- pH (near neutral)
- Temperature

=== Inhibitors of nitrification ===
Nitrification inhibitors are chemical compounds that slow the nitrification of ammonia, ammonium-containing, or urea-containing fertilizers, which are applied to soil as fertilizers. These inhibitors can help reduce losses of nitrogen in soil that would otherwise be used by crops. Nitrification inhibitors are used widely, being added to approximately 50% of the fall-applied anhydrous ammonia in states in the U.S., like Illinois. They are usually effective in increasing recovery of nitrogen fertilizer in row crops, but the level of effectiveness depends on external conditions and their benefits are most likely to be seen at less than optimal nitrogen rates.

The environmental concerns of nitrification also contribute to interest in the use of nitrification inhibitors: the primary product, nitrate, leaches into groundwater, producing toxicity in both humans and some species of wildlife and contributing to the eutrophication of standing water. Some inhibitors of nitrification also inhibit the production of methane, a greenhouse gas.

The inhibition of the nitrification process is primarily facilitated by the selection and inhibition/destruction of the bacteria that oxidize ammonia compounds. A multitude of compounds inhibit nitrification, which can be divided into the following areas: the active site of ammonia monooxygenase (AMO), mechanistic inhibitors, and the process of N-heterocyclic compounds. The process for the latter of the three is not yet widely understood, but is prominent. The presence of AMO has been confirmed on many substrates that are nitrogen inhibitors such as dicyandiamide, ammonium thiosulfate, and nitrapyrin.

The conversion of ammonia to hydroxylamine is the first step in nitrification, where AH_{2} represents a range of potential electron donors.

NH_{3} + AH_{2} + O_{2} → NH_{2}OH + A + H_{2}O

This reaction is catalyzed by AMO. Inhibitors of this reaction bind to the active site on AMO and prevent or delay the process. The process of oxidation of ammonia by AMO is regarded with importance due to the fact that other processes require the co-oxidation of NH_{3} for a supply of reducing equivalents. This is usually supplied by the compound hydroxylamine oxidoreductase (HAO) which catalyzes the reaction:

NH_{2}OH + H_{2}O → NO_{2}^{−} + 5 H^{+} + 4 e^{−}

The mechanism of inhibition is complicated by this requirement. Kinetic analysis of the inhibition of NH_{3} oxidation has shown that the substrates of AMO have shown kinetics ranging from competitive to noncompetitive. The binding and oxidation can occur on two sites on AMO: in competitive substrates, binding and oxidation occurs at the NH_{3} site, while in noncompetitive substrates it occurs at another site.

Mechanism based inhibitors can be defined as compounds that interrupt the normal reaction catalyzed by an enzyme. This method occurs by the inactivation of the enzyme via covalent modification of the product, which ultimately inhibits nitrification. Through the process, AMO is deactivated and one or more proteins is covalently bonded to the final product. This is found to be most prominent in a broad range of sulfur or acetylenic compounds.

Sulfur-containing compounds, including ammonium thiosulfate (a popular inhibitor) are found to operate by producing volatile compounds with strong inhibitory effects such as carbon disulfide and thiourea.

In particular, thiophosphoryl triamide (S=P(NH_{2})_{3}) has been a notable addition where it has the dual purpose of inhibiting both the production of urease and nitrification. In a study of inhibitory effects of oxidation by the bacteria Nitrosomonas europaea, the use of thioethers resulted in the oxidation of these compounds to sulfoxides, where the S atom is the primary site of oxidation by AMO. This is most strongly correlated to the field of competitive inhibition.

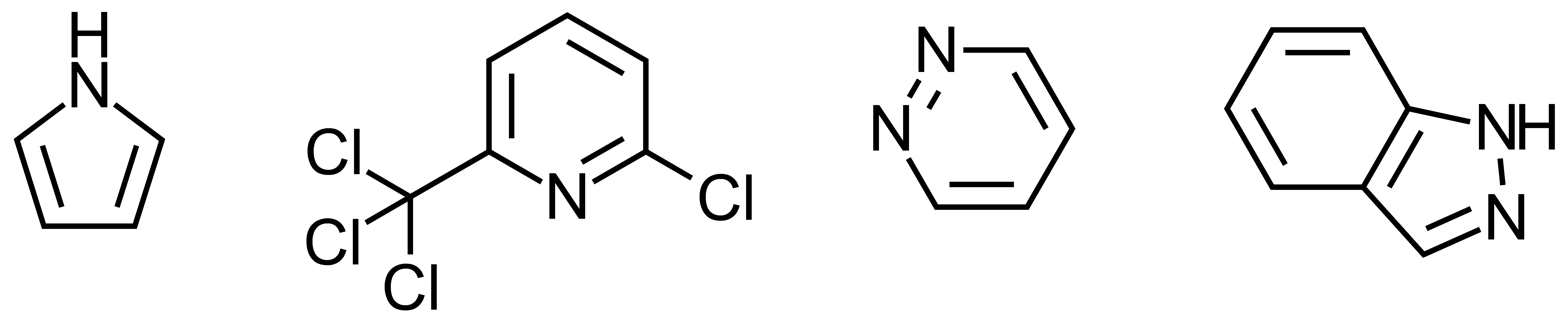
Examples of N-heterocyclic molecules.

N-heterocyclic compounds are also highly effective nitrification inhibitors and are often classified by their ring structure. The mode of action for these compounds is not well understood: while nitrapyrin, a widely used inhibitor and substrate of AMO, is a weak mechanism-based inhibitor of said enzyme, the effects of said mechanism are unable to correlate directly with the compound's ability to inhibit nitrification. It is suggested that nitrapyrin acts against the monooxygenase enzyme within the bacteria, preventing growth and CH_{4}/NH_{4} oxidation. Compounds containing two or three adjacent ring N atoms (pyridazine, pyrazole, indazole) tend to have a significantly higher inhibition effect than compounds containing non-adjacent N atoms or singular ring N atoms (pyridine, pyrrole). This suggests that the presence of ring N atoms is directly correlated with the inhibition effect of this class of compounds.

=== Methane oxidation inhibition ===
Some enzymatic nitrification inhibitors, such as nitrapyrin, can also inhibit the oxidation of methane in methanotrophic bacteria. AMO shows similar kinetic turnover rates to methane monooxygenase (MMO) found in methanotrophs, indicating that MMO is a similar catalyst to AMO for the purpose of methane oxidation. Furthermore, methanotrophic bacteria share many similarities to NH_{3} oxidizers such as Nitrosomonas. The inhibitor profile of particulate forms of MMO (pMMO) shows similarity to the profile of AMO, leading to similarity in properties between MMO in methanotrophs and AMO in autotrophs.

== Environmental concerns ==
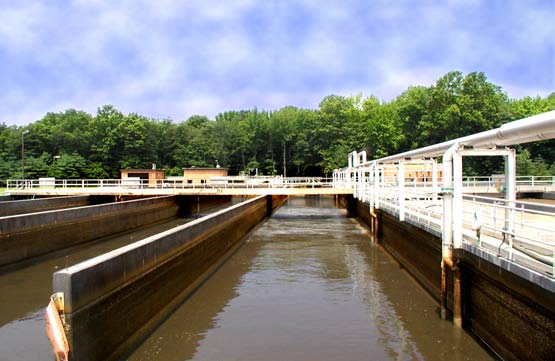
Nitrification process tank at a sewage treatment plant

Nitrification inhibitors are also of interest from an environmental standpoint because of the production of nitrates and nitrous oxide from the nitrification process. Nitrous oxide (N_{2}O), although its atmospheric concentration is much lower than that of CO_{2,} has a global warming potential of about 300 times greater than carbon dioxide and contributes 6% of planetary warming due to greenhouse gases. This compound is also notable for catalyzing the breakup of ozone in the stratosphere. Nitrates, a toxic compound for wildlife and livestock and a product of nitrification, are also of concern.

Soil, consisting of polyanionic clays and silicates, generally has a net anionic charge. Consequently, ammonium (NH_{4}^{+}) binds tightly to the soil, but nitrate ions (NO_{3}^{−}) do not. Because nitrate is more mobile, it leaches into groundwater supplies through agricultural runoff. Nitrates in groundwater can affect surface water concentrations through direct groundwater-surface water interactions (e.g., gaining stream reaches, springs) or from when it is extracted for surface use. For example, much of the drinking water in the United States comes from groundwater, but most wastewater treatment plants discharge to surface water.

Among wildlife, amphibians (tadpoles) and freshwater fish eggs are most sensitive to elevated nitrate levels and experience growth and developmental damage at levels commonly found in U.S. freshwater bodies (<20 mg/l). In contrast, freshwater invertebrates are more tolerant (~90+mg/l), and adult freshwater fish can tolerate very high levels (800 mg+/l). Nitrate levels also contribute to eutrophication, a process in which large algal blooms reduce oxygen levels in bodies of water and lead to death in oxygen-consuming creatures due to anoxia. Nitrification is also thought to contribute to the formation of photochemical smog, ground-level ozone, acid rain, changes in species diversity, and other undesirable processes. In addition, nitrification inhibitors have also been shown to suppress the oxidation of methane (CH_{4}), a potent greenhouse gas, to CO_{2}. Both nitrapyrin and acetylene are shown to be potent suppressors of both processes, although the modes of action distinguishing them are unclear.

== See also ==
- f-ratio
- Haber process
- Nitrifying bacteria
- Nitrogen fixation
- Simultaneous nitrification-denitrification
- Comammox
