= Nitrite reductase =

Class of enzymes

nitrite reductase

Identifiers
- EC no.: 1.7.2.1
- CAS no.: 9027-00-3

Databases
- BRENDA: enzyme data
- ExPASy: NiceZyme view
- KEGG: enzyme entry
- MetaCyc: metabolic pathway
- Rhea: reactions
- PDB structures: RCSB PDB PDBe PDBsum
- Gene Ontology: AmiGO / QuickGO
Search
- PMC: articles
- PubMed: articles
- NCBI: proteins

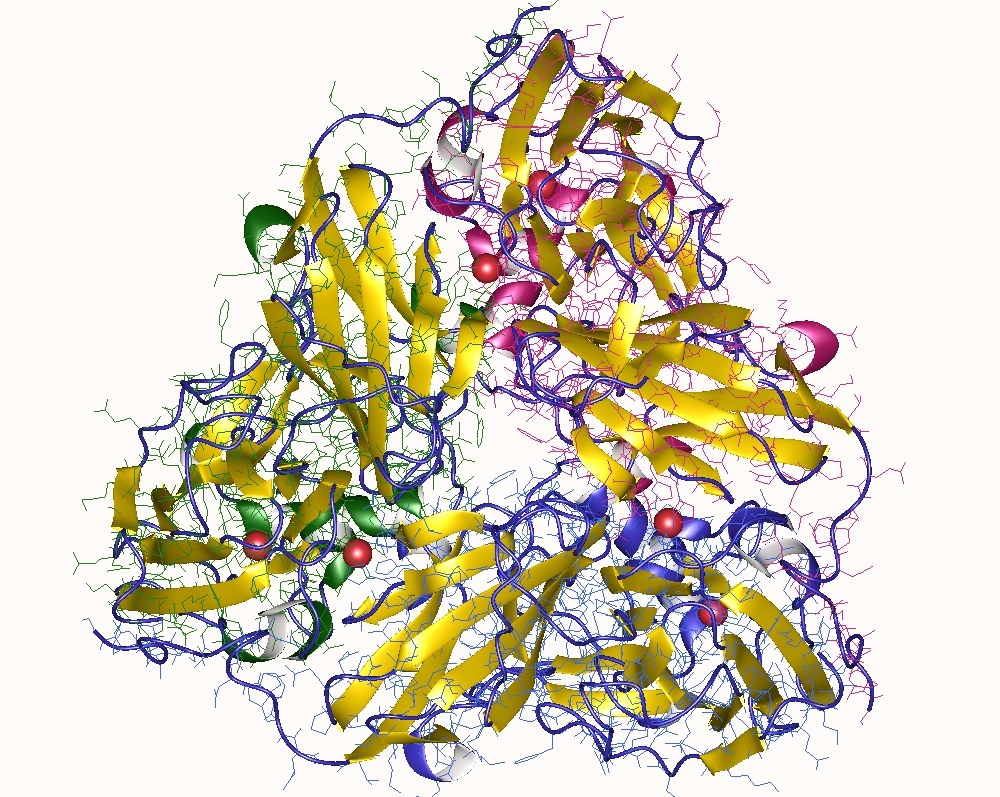
Nitrite reductase trimer + 6 Cu (red), Alcaligenes faecalis

Nitrite reductase refers to any of several classes of enzymes that catalyze the reduction of nitrite. There are two classes of NIRs. A multi heme enzyme reduces NO^{−}_{2} to a variety of products. Copper containing enzymes carry out a single electron transfer to produce nitric oxide.

== Iron based ==
There are several types of iron based enzymes. Cytochrome cd_{1}, or Pseudomonas cytochrome oxidase contains two c and two d type hemes with two polypeptide chains. Different forms of this reductase catalyze the formation of nitric oxide or nitrous oxide. A version of this compound was originally called [Ferrocytochrome c-551:oxidoreductase]. It was initially considered an oxidase. It catalyzes the reduction of NO_{2}^{−} to NO. This tetraheme enzyme has two subunits, each containing a c-type and a d-type heme. The reduced d hemes bind nitrite and convert it to product.

Cytochrome c nitrite reductase (ccNIR) is a multiheme enzyme that converts nitrite to ammonia on each active site. The active site iron is bound to a protoporphyrin IX ring that is covalently linked to the enzyme's proteins.

=== Proposed mechanism ===
The ccNIR protein uses six electrons and seven hydrogens to reduce nitrite to ammonia. The active site of the enzyme contains an iron in a +2 oxidation state. The oxidation level allows nitrite to bond more strongly than to the +3 state due to increased pi backbonding. This electronic effect transfers electron density into the nitrite antibonding orbital between nitrogen and oxygen. The occupation of the LUMO decreases the strength of the N-O bond. A second electronic effect is the hydrogen bonding of both oxygens to nearby amino acids. These acids are often arginine and Histidine. The interactions lengthen the N-O bonds and facilitate cleavage of an oxygen from nitrogen.

The Fe-NO bond is linear and has six shared valence electrons. This is not a stable state for an Fe-NO bond. However, a bent seven electron configuration is too stable to undergo further reaction without considerable energy input. To compensate for this barrier, two rapid, consecutive, single electron reductions form an eight electron complex. The electron transfer occurs before a shift in geometry from a linear to bent geometry.

Two protonations of the nitrogen lead to an increased N-O bond distance. The resulting intermediate is a hydroxylamine. further protonation of the hydroxylamine leads to the breakage of the N-O bond to form water. The oxidation of iron from Fe^{(II)} to Fe^{(III)}, coupled with a further protonation of nitrogen leads to the release of ammonia.

== Copper based ==
To date, there have been several types of Copper Nitrite Reductases discovered. These CuNIR are found in many different fungi and bacteria; for example, the bacterial genera Pseudomonas, Bordetella, Alcaligenes, and Achromobacter all contain CuNIR. What is common to all CuNIR is the presence of at least one type 1 copper center in the protein. These centers are similar to Azurin in their bonding structure. Each type 1 Cu is strongly bonded to a thiolate sulfur from a cysteine, two imidazole nitrogens from different Histidine residues, and a sulfur atom of an axial Methionine ligand. This induces a distorted tetrahedral molecular geometry.

The cysteine ligated to the type 1 Cu center is located directly next to a Histidine in the primary structure of the amino acids. This Histidine is bound to the Type 2 Cu center responsible for binding and reducing nitrite. This Cys-His bridge plays an important role in facilitating rapid electron transfer from the type 1 center to the type 2.

=== Proposed mechanism ===
The type 2 copper center of a copper nitrite reductase is the active site of the enzyme. The Cu is bound by nitrogens of two Histidines from one monomer, and bound by one Histidine from another monomer; the Cys-His bridge to the type 1 Cu. This gives the molecule a distorted tetrahedral geometry. In the resting state, the Cu is also binding a water molecule that is displaced by nitrite.

As nitrite displaces water, Cu is bound by both oxygens in a bidentate fashion. A nearby Aspartic acid residue hydrogen bonds to one of the newly formed oxygen ligands. An incoming electron reduces the Cu from oxidation state (II) to (I). This change facilitates a shift in nitrite binding so that the nitrogen is bound to Cu, and one oxygen has an extended bond length due to hydrogen bonding. A second hydrogen bond forms from Histidine or a nearby water molecule and leads to the cleavage of the N-O bond. The Cu is now five coordinate bonded to nitric oxide and water. Nitric oxide is released as Cu is oxidized to state (II) and returns to the resting configuration.

== Assimilatory ==
ferredoxin-nitrite reductase

Identifiers
- EC no.: 1.7.7.1
- CAS no.: 37256-44-3

Databases
- BRENDA: enzyme data
- ExPASy: NiceZyme view
- KEGG: enzyme entry
- MetaCyc: metabolic pathway
- Rhea: reactions
- PDB structures: RCSB PDB PDBe PDBsum
- Gene Ontology: AmiGO / QuickGO
Search
- PMC: articles
- PubMed: articles
- NCBI: proteins

Assimilatory nitrate reductase is an enzyme of the assimilative metabolism involved in reduction of nitrate to nitrite. The nitrite is immediately reduced to ammonia (probably via hydroxylamine) by the activity of nitrite reductase.

The term assimilatory refers to the fact that the product of the enzymatic activity remains in the organism. In this case, the product is ammonia which has an inhibitive effect on assimilatory nitrate reductase, thus ensuring that the organism produces the ammonia according to its requirements.

== See also ==
- Nitrite oxidoreductase
- Ferredoxin—nitrite reductase (NiR) involved in the assimilation of nitrates by plants
