= Nitrapyrin =

Names
- Preferred IUPAC name 2-Chloro-6-(trichloromethyl)pyridine
- Other names N-serve, 2,2,2,6-Tetrachloro-2-picoline

Identifiers
CAS Number	1929-82-4
3D model (JSmol)	Interactive image
ChEBI	CHEBI:81935
ChemSpider	15205
ECHA InfoCard	100.016.076
PubChem CID	16004
UNII	8PCE86U01W
CompTox Dashboard (EPA)	DTXSID0024216
- InChI: InChI=1S/C6H3Cl4N/c7-5-3-1-2-4(11-5)6(8,9)10/h1-3H Key: DCUJJWWUNKIJPH-UHFFFAOYSA-N; InChI=1/C6H3Cl4N/c7-5-3-1-2-4(11-5)6(8,9)10/h1-3H Key: DCUJJWWUNKIJPH-UHFFFAOYAC
- SMILES: c1cc(nc(c1)Cl)C(Cl)(Cl)Cl

Properties
Chemical formula	C_{6}H_{3}Cl_{4}N
Molar mass	230.907
Appearance	colorless/white crystalline solid
Odor	Sweet
Melting point	63 °C; 145 °F; 336 K
Solubility in water	insoluble
Vapor pressure	0.003 mmHg (22.8°C)

Hazards
- Occupational safety and health (OHS/OSH)
Main hazards	explosive
- NIOSH (US health exposure limits)
PEL (Permissible)	TWA 15 mg/m^{3} (total) TWA 5 mg/m^{3} (resp)
REL (Recommended)	TWA 10 mg/m^{3} (total) ST 20 mg/m^{3} (total) TWA 5 mg/m^{3} (resp)
IDLH (Immediate danger)	N.D.
- Except where otherwise noted, data are given for materials in their standard state (at 25 °C [77 °F], 100 kPa). Infobox references

Nitrapyrin is an organic compound with the formula ClC_{5}H_{3}NCCl_{3}, and is described as a white crystalline solid with a sweet odor. It is used as a nitrification inhibitor and bactericide, which is applied to soils for the growing of agricultural crops since 1974. Nitrapyrin was put up for review by the EPA and deemed safe for use in 2005. Nitrapyrin is an effective nitrification inhibitor to the bacteria Nitrosomonas and has been shown to drastically the reduce the amount of N_{2}O emissions from the soil.

== Synthesis ==
Nitrapyrin is commonly produced by the photochlorination of 2-methylpyridine:

CH_{3}-C_{5}H_{4}N + 4Cl_{2} → CCl_{3}-ClC_{5}H_{3}N + 4 HCl

== Function ==
Nitrapyrin affects the ammonia monooxygenase (AMO) pathway, which is important for NH_{3} oxidation in nitrification; it also functions as an inhibitor of the urease enzyme in the nitrifying bacteria Nitrosomonas, preventing hydrolytic action on urea. It is applied to the region of soil and inhibits nitrification for 8–10 weeks. Urease Inhibition specifically prevents the following reaction:

(NH_{2})_{2}CO + H_{2}O → CO_{2} + 2NH_{3}

Without this capability Nitrosomonas cannot produce nitrite thus inhibiting nitrification:

2NH_{4}^{+} + 3O_{2} → 2NO_{2}^{−} + 2 H_{2}O + 4H^{+}

== Degradation/Decomposition ==
Nitrapyrin decomposes both in soil and in plants. The compound itself tends not to persist in nature. The primary decomposition is the hydrolysis of the trichloromethyl functional group, resulting primarily in 6-chloro-picolinic acid which is the only detected residue in plant metabolisms.

== Effects in Agriculture ==
In an agricultural setting, nitrapyrin is seen to increase nitrogen retention and decrease nitrogen leaching in root zone. Nitrapyrin also has the effect of increasing crop yield and decreasing emissions of N_{2}O gas. Nitrapyrin isn't the only product applied to soils for the growing of crops, when combined with urea and mulch, wheat biomass increased by 33% and overall yield increased by 23%. Total N_{2}O emissions reduced by 66-75% when compared to urea only experiments, suggesting that nitrapyrin affects the ability of ammonia-oxidizing bacteria to engage in nitrification and produce N_{2}O gas.
