= SHARON Wastewater Treatment =

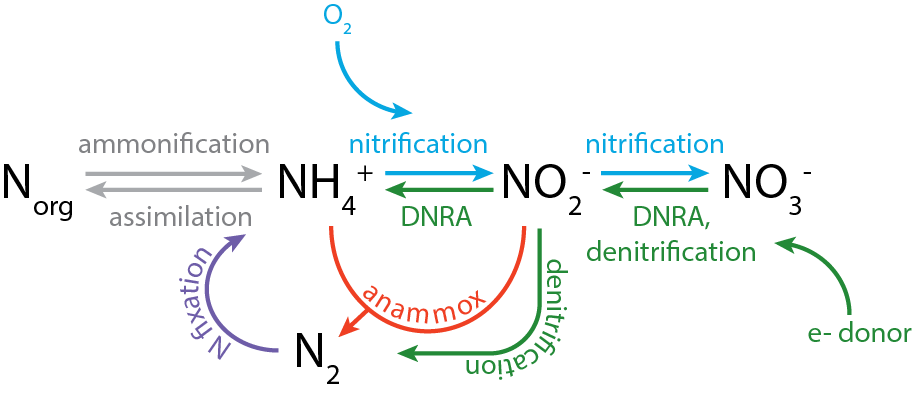
Illustration of the nitrification of ammonia to nitrite and anammox chemical reactions.

SHARON (Single reactor system for High activity Ammonium Removal Over Nitrite) is a sewage treatment process. A partial nitrification process of sewage treatment used for the removal of ammonia and organic nitrogen components from wastewater flow streams. The process results in stable nitrite formation, rather than complete oxidation to nitrate. Nitrate formation by nitrite oxidising bacteria (NOB) (such as Nitrobacter) is prevented by adjusting temperature, pH, and retention time to select for nitrifying ammonia oxidising bacteria (AOB) (such as Nitrosomonas). Denitrification of waste streams utilizing SHARON reactors can proceed with an anoxic reduction, such as anammox.

== Mechanism ==
The SHARON (Single reactor system for High activity Ammonium Removal Over Nitrite) wastewater treatment process is a combination of two already used nitrogen removing reactions. One process utilizes fast growing nitrifiers utilizing nitrification of ammonia to nitrite and Anammox which is the denitrification of nitrite to atmospheric nitrogen using ammonia as an electron donor. The combination of the two processes allows for a more efficient conversion of ammonia and prevents a buildup of nitrate in the water. This combination also provides an improvement to the already established processes by having a much lower energy and COD requirements.

Waste entering this process must first undergo the nitrification of ammonia to nitrite so there is nitrite in high enough concentration for anammox to be fueled. This first step typically needs to convert ~50% of the ammonia in the waste stream before anammox can begin. To obtain this delay a key technique used is to utilize the different growth rates found in ammonia oxidizers and nitrite oxidizers. Ammonia oxidizers have a significantly higher growth rate then Nitrite oxidizers at high temperatures so if utilized properly ammonia oxidizers will reach the log phase and begin the nitrification before the nitrite oxidizers start anammox. Once the Anammox process begins the reactions rates of nitrification vs Anammox must be closely controlled as to completely remove ammonia from the stream. To maintain the balance between these two processes control of the pH is utilized.

In this process works as a chemostat making the SLT(Sludge Retention Time) the same as the HLT(Hydraulic Retention Time). This characteristic makes the process insensitive to suspended solids concentrations in the water.
