= Nitrospira =

Scientific classification
- Domain: Bacteria
- Kingdom: Pseudomonadati
- Phylum: Nitrospirota
- Class: Nitrospira
- Order: Nitrospirales
- Family: Nitrospiraceae
- Genus: Nitrospira; Watson et al. 1986

Type species
- Nitrospira marina Watson et al. 1986

Species
- See text

Genus of bacteria

Nitrospira (from Latin: nitro, meaning "nitrate" and Greek: spira, meaning "spiral") is a genus of bacteria within the monophyletic clade of the Nitrospirota phylum. The first member of this genus was described 1986 by Watson et al., isolated from the Gulf of Maine. The bacterium was named Nitrospira marina. Populations were initially thought to be limited to marine ecosystems, but it was later discovered to be well-suited for numerous habitats, including activated sludge of wastewater treatment systems, natural biological marine settings (such as the Seine River in France and beaches in Cape Cod in the United States), water circulation biofilters in aquarium tanks, terrestrial systems, fresh and salt water ecosystems, agricultural lands and hot springs. Nitrospira is a ubiquitous bacterium that plays a role in the nitrogen cycle by performing nitrite oxidation in the second step of nitrification. Nitrospira live in a wide array of environments including but not limited to, drinking water systems, waste treatment plants, rice paddies, forest soils, geothermal springs, and sponge tissue. Despite being abundant in many natural and engineered ecosystems Nitrospira are difficult to culture, so most knowledge of them is from molecular and genomic data. However, due to their difficulty to be cultivated in laboratory settings, the entire genome was only sequenced in one species, Nitrospira defluvii. In addition, Nitrospira bacteria's 16S rRNA sequences are too dissimilar to use for PCR primers, thus some members go unnoticed. In addition, members of Nitrospira with the capabilities to perform complete nitrification (comammox bacteria) has also been discovered and cultivated.

== Morphology ==
For the following description, Nitrospira moscoviensis will be representative of the Nitrospira genus. Nitrospira is a Gram-negative nitrite-oxidizing organism with a helical to vibroid morphology (0.9–2.2 × 0.2–0.4 micrometres in size). They are non-planktonic organisms that reside as clumps, known as aggregates, in biofilms. Visualization using transmission electron microscopy (TEM) confirms star-like protrusions on the outer membrane (6–8 nm thick). The periplasmic space is exceptionally wide (34–41 nm thick), which provides space to accommodate electron-rich molecules. Electron-deprived structures are located in the cytosol and are believed to be glycogen storage vesicles; polyhydroxybutyrate and polyphosphate granules are also identified in the cytoplasm. DNA analysis determined 56.9 +/- 0.4 mol% of the DNA to be guanine and cytosine base pairs.

== General metabolism ==
Nitrospira are capable of aerobic hydrogen oxidation and nitrite oxidation to obtain electrons, but high concentrations of nitrite have shown to inhibit their growth. The optimal temperature for nitrite oxidation and growth in Nitrospira moscoviensis is 39 °C (can range from 33–44 °C) at a pH range of 7.6–8.0 Despite being commonly classified as obligate chemolithotrophs, some are capable of mixotrophy. For instance, under different environments, Nitrospira can choose to assimilate carbon by carbon fixation or by consuming organic molecules (glycerol, pyruvate, or formate). New studies also show that Nitrospira can use urea as a source of nutrients. Urease encoded within their genome can break urea down to CO_{2} and ammonia. The CO_{2} can be assimilated by anabolism while the ammonia and organic by-product released by Nitrospira allow ammonium oxidizers and other microbes to co-exist in the same microenvironment.

== Nitrification ==
All members of this genus have the nitrite oxidoreductase genes, and thus are all thought to be nitrite-oxidizers. Ever since nitrifying bacteria were discovered it was accepted that nitrification occurred in two steps, although it would be energetically favourable for one organism to do both steps. Recently Nitrospira members with the abilities to perform complete nitrification (comammox bacteria) have also been discovered and cultivated as in the case of Nitrospira inopinata. The discovery of commamox organisms within Nitrospira redefine the way bacteria contribute to the Nitrogen cycle and thus a lot of future studies will be dedicated to it.

With these new findings there's now a possibility to mainly use complete nitrification instead of partial nitrification in engineered systems like wastewater treatment plants because complete nitrification results in lower emissions of the greenhouse gases: nitrous oxide and nitric oxide, into the atmosphere.

== Genome ==
After sequencing and analyzing the DNA of Nitrospira members, researchers discovered both species had genes encoding ammonia monooxygenase (Amo) and hydroxlyamine dehydrogenase (hao), enzymes that ammonia-oxidizing bacteria (AOB) use to convert ammonia into nitrite. The bacteria possess all necessary sub-units for both enzymes as well as the necessary cell membrane associated proteins and transporters to carry out the first step of nitrification. Origins of the Amo gene are debatable as one study found that it is similar to other AOB[3], while another study found the Amo gene to be genetically distinct from other lineages. Current findings indicate that the hao gene is phylogenetically distinct from the hao gene present in other AOB, meaning that they acquired them long ago, likely by horizontal gene transfer.

Nitrospira also carry the genes encoding for all the sub-units of nitrite oxidoreductase (nxr), the enzyme that catalyzes the second step of nitrification.

== Phylogeny ==
The currently accepted taxonomy is based on the List of Prokaryotic names with Standing in Nomenclature (LSPN) and National Center for Biotechnology Information (NCBI). Phylogeny is based on GTDB 09-RS220 by Genome Taxonomy Database

- Nitrospirales
  - UBA8639
    - "Ca. Nitronereus thalassa" Mueller et al. 2023
    - - Nitrospira_E
        - "Ca. Nitrospira allomarina" Mueller et al. 2023
        - "Ca. Nitrospira neomarina" Mueller et al. 2023
  - Nitrospiraceae
    - Nitrospira
      - "N. tepida" Keuter et al. 2023
      - - "N. defluvii" Nowka et al. 2015
        - - "N. japonica" Ushiki et al. 2013
          - - "N. lenta" Nowka et al. 2015
            - - N. moscoviensis Ehrich et al. 1995
              - - "Ca. N. inopinata" Daims et al. 2015
                - - "Ca. N. kreftii" Sakoula et al. 2021
                  - - "Ca. N. nitrificans" van Kessel et al. 2015
                    - "Ca. N. nitrosa" van Kessel et al. 2015

Species incertae sedis:

- "Ca. N. alkalitolerans" Daebeler et al. 2020
- "Ca. N. bockiana" Lebedeva et al. 2008
- "N. calida" Lebedeva et al. 2011
- N. marina Watson et al. 1986
- "Ca. N. salsa" Haaijer et al. 2013

== See also ==
- Nitrogen cycle
- List of bacterial orders
- List of bacteria genera
