= Nitrite oxidoreductase =

Enzyme

Nitrite oxidoreductase (NOR or NXR) is an enzyme involved in nitrification. It is the last step in the process of aerobic ammonia oxidation, which is carried out by two groups of nitrifying bacteria: ammonia oxidizers such as Nitrosospira, Nitrosomonas, and Nitrosococcus convert ammonia to nitrite, while nitrite oxidizers such as Nitrobacter and Nitrospira oxidize nitrite to nitrate. NXR is responsible for producing almost all nitrate found in nature.

NXR belongs to the class of EC numbers 1.7.2- where 1 describes an oxidoreductase, 1.7 describes nitrogen compounds as donors, and 1.7.2- describes cytochromes as acceptors.

== Structure ==
NXR is composed of 2 mainly known subunits; nitrite oxidoreductase α (NxrA), and nitrite oxidoreductase β (NxrB) (sometimes written as NorA and NorB). However, recent studies describe a third and fourth subunit, NxrC and NxrT The enzyme's known active site is on the NxrA subunit. There are two types of NXR; one where the NxrA subunit is located in the periplasmic space of a cell, and the other where NxrA is located in the cytoplasm

The enzyme is bound to the inner cytoplasmic surface of the bacterial membrane and contains iron-sulfur centers and a molybdenum cofactor. The enzyme is relatively abundant, making up 10-30% of the total protein in these bacteria and forms densely packed structures on the membrane surface. To date, little is known about the exact structure of NXR, but has been discovered to form tubule structures that are hundreds of nanometers long.

== Pathway ==
Reaction
$$\ce{{nitrite} + acceptor <=> {nitrate} + reduced\ acceptor}$$

NXR oxidizes nitrite into nitrate in aerobic nitrogen oxidizing bacteria as well as ammonia to nitrite in ammonia oxidizing bacteria or archaea. When it oxidizes nitrite to nitrate, two electrons are shuttled into the respiratory chain. Electrons flow through the subunits of the enzyme through cytochrome c toward the terminal oxidase. This reaction can be reversed to reduce nitrate to nitrite in anaerobic conditions, though the driving force of this reversal is poorly understood.

== Metabolism ==
In periplasmic NXR types, protons are derived from water and contribute to proton motive force, which then contributes to the cell's energy budget. However, cytoplasmic NXR does not contribute to proton motive force. The two electrons that are generated from the nitrite oxidation are then donated to molecular oxygen, which yields energy. The NXR pathway for nitrite oxidation generally has a low energy yield (ΔG’ = -74 kJ/mol NO_{2}).

== See also ==
- Microbial metabolism
- Ferredoxin—nitrite reductase involved in the assimilation of nitrates by plants
