= Dissimilatory nitrate reduction to ammonium =

Anaerobic respiration process by microbes

Dissimilatory nitrate reduction to ammonium (DNRA), also known as nitrate/nitrite ammonification, is the result of anaerobic respiration by chemoorganoheterotrophic microbes using nitrate (NO_{3}^{−}) as an electron acceptor for respiration. In anaerobic conditions microbes which undertake DNRA oxidise organic matter and use nitrate (rather than oxygen) as an electron acceptor, reducing it to nitrite, and then to ammonium (NO_{3}^{−} → NO_{2}^{−} → NH_{4}^{+}).

Dissimilatory nitrate reduction to ammonium is more common in prokaryotes but may also occur in eukaryotic microorganisms. DNRA is a component of the terrestrial and oceanic nitrogen cycle. Unlike denitrification, it acts to conserve bioavailable nitrogen in the system, producing soluble ammonium rather than unreactive nitrogen gas (N_{2}).

== Background and process ==
=== Cellular process ===
Dissimilatory nitrate reduction to ammonium is a two step process, reducing NO_{3}^{−} to NO_{2}^{−} then NO_{2}^{−} to NH_{4}^{+}, though the reaction may begin with NO_{2}^{−} directly. Each step is mediated by a different enzyme, the first step of dissimilatory nitrate reduction to ammonium is usually mediated by a periplasmic nitrate reductase. The second step (respiratory NO_{2}^{−} reduction to NH_{4}^{+}) is mediated by cytochrome c nitrite reductase, occurring at the periplasmic membrane surface. Despite DNRA not producing nitrous oxide (N_{2}O) as an intermediate during nitrate reduction (as denitrification does), N_{2}O may still be released as a byproduct, thus DNRA may also act as a sink of fixed, bioavailable nitrogen. DNRA's production of N_{2}O may be enhanced at higher pH levels.

=== Denitrification ===
Dissimilatory nitrate reduction to ammonium is similar to the process of denitrification, though NO_{2}^{−} is reduced farther to NH_{4}^{+} rather than to N_{2}, transferring eight electrons. Both denitrifiers and nitrate ammonifiers are competing for NO_{3}^{−} in the environment. Despite the redox potential of dissimilatory nitrate reduction to ammonium being lower than denitrification and producing less Gibbs free energy, energy yield of denitrification may not be efficiently conserved in its series of enzymatic reactions and nitrate ammonifiers may achieve higher growth rates and outcompete denitrifiers. This is may be especially pronounced when NO_{3}^{−} is limiting compared to organic carbon, as organic carbon is oxidised more 'efficiently' per NO_{3}^{−} (as each molecule NO_{3}^{−} is reduced farther). The balance of denitrification and DNRA is important to the nitrogen cycle of an environment as both use NO_{3}^{−} but, unlike denitrification, which produces gaseous, non-bioavailable N_{2} (a sink of nitrogen), DNRA produces bioavailable, soluble NH_{4}^{+}.

== Marine context ==
=== Marine microorganisms ===
As dissimilatory nitrate reduction to ammonium is an anaerobic respiration process, marine microorganisms capable of performing DNRA are most commonly found in environments low in O_{2}, such as oxygen minimum zones (OMZs) in the water column, or sediments with steep O_{2} gradients.

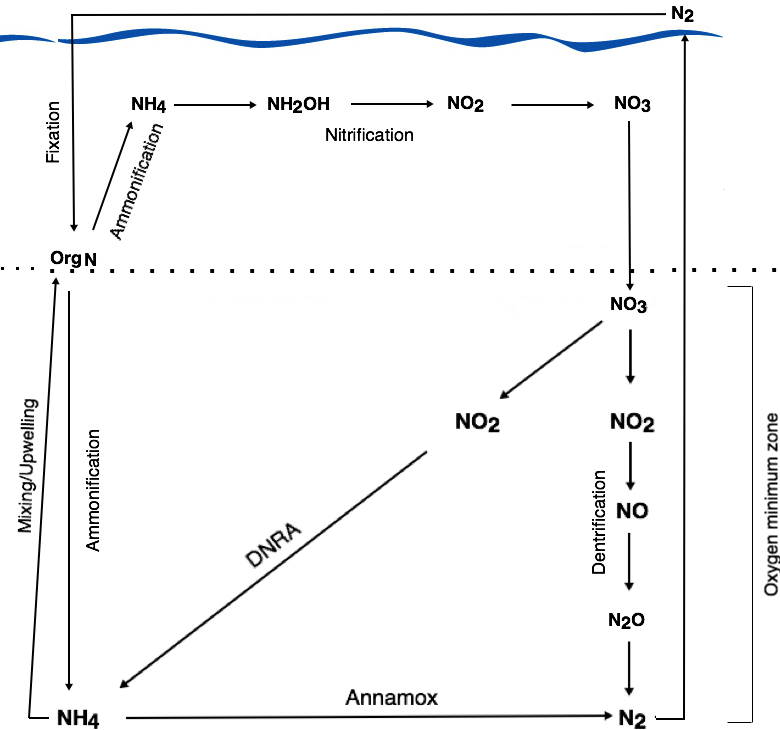
The oceanic nitrogen cycle with the role of DNRA. Blue line represents the ocean surface, with the atmosphere above. Notice how NH_{4} produced by DNRA can be taken up by biota and converted into organic nitrogen, while N_{2} produced by denitrification is removed from the system, and may only re-enter via nitrogen fixation. Organisms undertaking denitrification and DNRA compete for NO_{3} and the balance of the two processes depends on the abiotic and biotic conditions of the ecosystem (see section 'DNRA in the Marine Context', subheading 'Ecological Role').

DNRA has been documented in prokaryotes inhabiting the upper layer of marine sediments. For example, benthic sulfur bacteria in genera such as Beggiatoa and Thioploca inhabit anoxic sediments on continental shelves and obtain energy by oxidizing sulfide via DNRA. These bacteria are able to carry out DNRA using intracellular nitrate stored in vacuoles. The direct reduction of nitrate to ammonium via dissimilatory nitrate reduction, coupled with the direct conversion of ammonium to dinitrogen via Anammox, has been attributed to significant nitrogen loss in certain parts of the ocean; this DNRA-Anammox coupling by DNRA and Anammox bacteria can account for nitrate loss in areas with no detectable denitrification, such as in OMZs off the coast of Chile, Peru, and Namibia, as well as OMZs over the Omani Shelf in the Arabian Sea. While denitrification is more energetically favourable than DNRA, there is evidence that bacteria using DNRA conserve more energy than denitrifiers, allowing them to grow faster. Thus, via DNRA-Anammox coupling, bacteria using DNRA and Anammox may be stronger competitors for substrates than denitrifiers.

While dissimilatory nitrate reduction to ammonium is more commonly associated with prokaryotes, recent research has found increasing evidence of DNRA in various eukaryotic microorganisms. Of the known DNRA-capable fungal species, one is found in marine ecosystems; an isolate of ascomycete Aspergillus terreus from an OMZ of the Arabian Sea has been found to be capable of performing DNRA under anoxic conditions. Evidence of DNRA has also been found in marine foraminifers.

More recently, it has been discovered that using intracellular nitrate stores, diatoms can carry out dissimilatory nitrate reduction to ammonium, likely for short-term survival or for entering resting stages, thereby allowing them to persist in dark and anoxic conditions. However, their metabolism is probably not sustained by DNRA for long-term survival during resting stages, as these resting stages often can be much longer than their intracellular nitrate supply would last. The use of DNRA by diatoms is a possible explanation for how they can survive buried in dark, anoxic sediment layers on the ocean floor, without being able to carry out photosynthesis or aerobic respiration. Currently, DNRA is known to be carried out by the benthic diatom Amphora coffeaeformis, as well as the pelagic diatom Thalassiosira weissflogii. As diatoms are a significant source of oceanic primary production, the ability for diatoms to perform DNRA has major implications on their ecological role, as well as their role in the marine nitrogen cycle.

=== Ecological role ===
Unlike denitrification, which removes reactive nitrogen from the system under gaseous form (as N_{2} or N_{2}O), dissimilatory nitrate reduction to ammonium conserves nitrogen as dissolved species within the system. Since DNRA takes nitrate and converts it into ammonium, it does not produce N_{2} or N_{2}O gases. Consequently, DNRA recycles nitrogen rather than causing gaseous-N loss, which leads to more sustainable primary production and nitrification.

Within an ecosystem, denitrification and DNRA can occur simultaneously. Usually DNRA is about 15% of the total nitrate reduction rate, which includes both DNRA and denitrification. However, the relative importance of each process is influenced by environmental variables. For example, DNRA is found to be three to seven times higher in sediments under fish cages than nearby sediments due to the accumulation of organic carbon.

Conditions where dissimilatory nitrate reduction to ammonium is favoured over denitrification in marine coastal ecosystems include the following:

- High carbon loads and high sulfate reduction rates (e.g. areas of coastal or river runoff)
- Unvegetated subtidal sediment
- Marshes with high temperatures and sulfate reduction rates (producing high levels of sulfides), e.g. mangroves
- High organic matter deposition (e.g. aquacultures)
- Ecosystems where organic matter has a high C/N ratio
- High electron donor (organic carbon) to acceptor (nitrate) ratio
- High summer temperatures and low NO_{3}^{−} concentrations

High sulfide concentration can inhibit the processes of nitrification and denitrification. Meanwhile, it can also enhance dissimilatory nitrate reduction to ammonium since high sulfide concentration provides more electron donors.

Ecosystems where DNRA is dominant have less nitrogen loss, resulting in higher levels of preserved nitrogen in the system. Within sediments, the total dissimilatory nitrate reduction to ammonium rate is higher in spring and summer compared to autumn. Prokaryotes are the major contributors for DNRA during summer, while eukaryotes and prokaryotes contribute similarly to DNRA during spring and autumn.

Potential benefits of using dissimilatory nitrate reduction to ammonium for individual organisms may include the following:

- Detoxification of accumulated nitrite: if an enzyme uses nitrate as an electron acceptor and produces nitrite, it can result in high levels of intracellular nitrite concentrations that can be toxic to the cell. DNRA does not store nitrite within the cell, reducing the level of toxicity.
- DNRA produces an electron sink that can be used for NADH re-oxidation into NAD^{+}: the need for having an electron sink is more apparent when the environment is nitrate-limited.

=== Changes to f-ratio calculation ===
The balance of dissimilatory nitrate reduction to ammonium and denitrification alters the accuracy of f-ratio calculations. The f-ratio is used to quantify the efficiency of the biological pump, which reflects sequestering of carbon from the atmosphere to the deep sea. The f-ratio is calculated using estimates of 'new production' (primary productivity stimulated by nutrients entering the photic zone from outside the photic zone, for example from the deep ocean) and 'regenerated production' (primary productivity stimulated by nutrients already in the photic zone, released by remineralisation). Calculations of the f-ratio use the nitrogen species stimulating primary productivity as a proxy for the type of production occurring; productivity stimulated by NH_{4}^{+} rather than NO_{3}^{−} is 'regenerated production'. DNRA also produces NH_{4}^{+} (in addition to remineralisation) but from organic matter which has been exported from the photic zone; this may be subsequently reintroduced by mixing or upwelling of deeper water back to the surface, thereby, stimulating primary productivity; thus, in areas where high amounts of DNRA is occurring, f-ratio calculations will not be accurate.
