= Nitrospinota =

Scientific classification
- Domain: Bacteria
- Kingdom: Pseudomonadati
- Phylum: Nitrospinota; Lücker et al. 2021

Class
- Nitrospinia

Synonyms
- "Nitrospinota" Park et al. 2020; "Nitrospinae" Lücker et al. 2013

Phylum of bacteria

Nitrospinota is a bacterial phylum. Despite only few described species, members of this phylum are major nitrite-oxidizing bacteria in surface waters in oceans. By oxidation of nitrite to nitrate they are important in the process of nitrification in marine environments.

Although the genus Nitrospina is an aerobic bacterium, it was shown to oxidize nitrite also in oxygen minimum zone of the ocean. Depletion of oxygen in such zones leads to preference of anaerobic processes such as denitrification and nitrogen loss through anammox. Nitrospina thus outweigh nitrogen loss by nitrification also in these oxygen depleted zones.

Among the cultivated isolates within the genus Nitrospina are Nitrospina gracilis and Nitrospina watsonii. Further genomes were resolved by culture-independent metagenome binning. The two Nitrospina species are, however, distantly related to environmentally abundant uncultured Nitrospinota. The two other strains were cultivated in 2020 each in the binary culture with alphaproteobacterial heterotroph. They are called "Candidatus Nitrohelix vancouverensis" and "Candidatus Nitronauta litoralis". "Nitrohelix vancouverensis" is closely related to uncultivated environmentally abundant Nitrospinota clades 1 and 2.

== Taxonomy ==
Phylogeny of Nitrospinota

- - VA‑1
    - "Ca. Nitrohelix vancouverensis"
    - "Ca. Nitromaritima prima"
  - Nitrospinaceae
    - "Ca. Nitronauta litoralis"
    - - Nitrospina
        - N. gracilis
        - "N. watsonii"

The currently accepted taxonomy is based on the List of Prokaryotic names with Standing in Nomenclature (LPSN) and National Center for Biotechnology Information (NCBI).

- Class Nitrospinia Lucker et al. 2022
  - Order Nitrospinales Lücker et al. 2022
    - Family Nitrospinaceae Garrity, Bell & Lilburn 2006
      - Genus "Candidatus Nitrohelix" Mueller et al. 2021
        - "Ca. N. vancouverensis" Mueller et al. 2021
      - Genus "Candidatus Nitromaritima" Ngugi et al. 2016
        - "Ca. N. prima" Ngugi et al. 2016
      - Genus "Candidatus Nitronauta" Mueller et al. 2021
        - "Ca. N. litoralis" Mueller et al. 2021
      - Genus Nitrospina Watson & Waterbury 1971
        - N. gracilis Watson & Waterbury 1971
        - "N. watsonii" Spieck et al. 2014

== See also ==
- List of bacterial orders
- List of bacteria genera
