= Nitrospirota =

Scientific classification
- Domain: Bacteria
- Kingdom: Pseudomonadati
- Phylum: Nitrospirota; Garrity & Holt 2021

Classes and orders
- Nitrospiria; Thermodesulfovibrionia

Synonyms
- "Nitrospirae" Garrity and Holt 2001; "Nitrospiraeota" Oren et al. 2015; "Nitrospirota" Whitman et al. 2018

Phylum of bacteria

The Nitrospirota are a phylum of bacteria. They include multiple genera such as Nitrospira, the largest.

== History of knowledge ==
The first member of this phylum, Nitrospira marina, was discovered in 1985. The second member, Nitrospira moscoviensis, was discovered in 1995. Nitrospira inopinata was discovered in 2015 and cultivated in 2017.

== Metabolism ==
Nitrospirota contains nitrifying taxa which oxidize nitrite to nitrate (nitrite-oxidizing bacteria, NOB) and commamox bacteria: Nitrospira inopinata. Dissulfurispira thermophila (Thermodesulfovibrionia) grows by disproportionation of thiosulfate or elemental sulfur, so far the only known member of Nitrospirota capable of microbial sulfur disproportionation (MSD).

== Phylogeny ==
16S rRNA based LTP_10_2024

- Thermodesulfovibrionia Thermodesulfovibrionales
  - Dissulfurispiraceae
    Dissulfurispira
  - Thermodesulfovibrionaceae
    Thermodesulfovibrio

120 marker proteins based GTDB 10-RS226

- - Nitrospiria
    - "Troglogloeales"
      - "Manganitrophaceae"
        "Ca. Manganitrophus"
    - Nitrospirales
      - UBA8639
        - "Ca. Nitronereus"
        - Nitrospira_E
      - Nitrospiraceae
        Nitrospira
  - Thermodesulfovibrionia Thermodesulfovibrionales
    - - "Sulfobiaceae"
        "Ca. Sulfobium"
    - - - Thermodesulfovibrionaceae
          Thermodesulfovibrio
        - Dissulfurispiraceae
          - Dissulfurispira
          - "Ca. Nitrobium"
      - - "Magnetobacteriaceae"
          - "Ca. Magnetocorallium"
          - - "Ca. Magnetomicrobium"
            - - "Ca. Magnetominusculus"
              - "Ca. Magnetobacterium"

== Taxonomy ==
The currently accepted taxonomy is based on the List of Prokaryotic names with Standing in Nomenclature (LSPN) and National Center for Biotechnology Information (NCBI).

- Genus ?"Candidatus Thermomagnetovibrio" Lefèvre et al. 2010
- Class Nitrospiria Garrity & Holt 2022
  - Order Nitrospirales Garrity & Holt 2022
    - Family UBA8639
      - Genus "Candidatus Nitronereus" Mueller et al. 2023
    - Family Nitrospiraceae Garrity & Holt 2022
      - Genus ?"Candidatus Nitronatura" Singleton et al. 2025
      - Genus ?"Candidatus Nitrosymbion" Glasl et al. 2024
      - Genus ?"Candidatus Porinitrospira" Taylor et al. 2022
      - Genus Nitrospira Watson et al. 1986
  - Order "Troglogloeales" Yu et al. 2022
    - Genus ?"Candidatus Troglogloea" corrig. Kostanjsek et al. 2013
    - Family "Manganitrophaceae" Yu et al. 2022
      - Genus "Candidatus Manganitrophus" Yu & Leadbetter 2020
- Class Thermodesulfovibrionia Umezawa et al. 2021
  - Order "Mariimomonadales" Yoon et al. 2023
    - Family "Mariimomonadaceae" Yoon et al. 2023
      - Genus ?"Candidatus Mariimomonas Yoon et al. 2023
  - Order Thermodesulfovibrionales Umezawa et al. 2023
    - Family "Sulfobiaceae" Pallen, Rodriguez-R & Alikhan 2022 [UBA6898]
      - Genus "Candidatus Sulfobium" Zecchin et al. 2018
    - Family Thermodesulfovibrionaceae Umezawa et al. 2021
      - Genus Thermodesulfovibrio Henry et al. 1994 emend. Sekiguchi et al. 2008
    - Family Dissulfurispiraceae Umezawa et al. 2021
      - Genus Dissulfurispira Umezawa et al. 2021
      - Genus "Candidatus Nitrobium" Arshad et al. 2017
    - Family "Magnetobacteriaceae" Chuvochina et al. 2023
      - Genus "Candidatus Magnetobacterium" Spring et al. 1993
      - Genus "Candidatus Magnetocorallium" Zhao et al. 2023
      - Genus "Candidatus Magnetomicrobium" Zhang et al. 2021
      - Genus "Candidatus Magnetominusculus" Lin et al. 2017
      - Genus ?"Candidatus Magnetovum" corrig. Lefevre et al. 2011

== See also ==
- Comammox
- Nitrate
- Nitrite
- Nitrogen cycle
- Nitrobacter
- Nitrobacteraceae
- Nitrosomonas
- Nitrospira
- List of bacterial orders
- List of bacteria genera
