= Nitrospira moscoviensis =

Scientific classification
- Domain: Bacteria
- Kingdom: Pseudomonadati
- Phylum: Nitrospirota
- Class: Nitrospira
- Order: Nitrospirales
- Family: Nitrospiraceae
- Genus: Nitrospira
- Species: N. moscoviensis

Binomial name
- Nitrospira moscoviensis Garrity et al. 2001

Species of bacterium

Nitrospira moscoviensis was the second bacterium classified under the most diverse nitrite-oxidizing bacteria phylum, Nitrospirae. It is a gram-negative, non-motile, facultative lithoauthotropic bacterium that was discovered in Moscow, Russia in 1995. The genus name, Nitrospira, originates from the prefix "nitro" derived from nitrite, the microbe's electron donor and "spira" meaning coil or spiral derived from the microbe's shape. The species name, moscoviensis, is derived from Moscow, where the species was first discovered. N. moscoviensis could potentially be used in the production of bio-degradable polymers.

== History ==
In 1995, Silke Ehrich discovered Nitrospira moscoviensis in a sample taken from an eroded iron pipe. The pipe was a part of a heating system in Moscow, Russia. The rust was transferred to a culture where cells could be isolated. For optimum growth, Ehrich and her team cultivated the cells on a mineral salt medium at a temperature of 39 °C and at a pH of 7.6-8.0.

== Morphology ==
Nitrospira moscoviensis is classified as being gram-negative, non-motile, and having a curved rod shape. The curved rods are approximately 0.9-2.2 μm long x 0.2-0.4 μm wide. N. moscoviensis can exist in both aquatic and terrestrial habitats and reproduces using binary fission. Defining features of N. moscoviensis is the absence of intra-cytoplasmic membranes and carboxysomes possession of a flatulent periplasmic space.

== Metabolism ==
Nitrospira moscoviensis is a facultative lithoautotroph commonly referred to as a chemolithoautotroph. In aerobic environments, N. moscoviensis obtains energy by oxidizing nitrite to nitrate. Without the element molybdenum, the nitrite-oxidizing system will not function. When N. moscoviensis is in nitrite free environments it can use aerobic hydrogen oxidation. When N. moscoviensis reduces nitrite using hydrogen as an electron donor growth is blocked. A key difference in N. moscoviensis' nitrite-oxidizing system is location; unlike most nitrate oxidizing systems, it is not located in the cytoplasmic membrane. Kirstein and Bock (1993) implied that the location of the nitrite-oxidizing system corresponds directly to N. moscoviensis having an enlarged periplasmic space. By oxidizing nitrate outside of the cytoplasmic membrane, a permease nitrite system is not needed for the proton gradient. The exocytoplasmic oxidation of nitrite also prevents build-up of toxic nitrite within the cytoplasm. Another important metabolism ability for N. moscoviensis is its ability to cleave urea to ammonia and CO_{2}. The ability to use urea comes directly from the presence of urease encoding genes which is interesting because most nitrite-oxidizing bacteria are unable to use ammonia as an energy source. Urease encoding genes function by catalyzing urea hydrolysis to form ammonia and carbamate.

== Ecology ==
Nitrospira moscoviensis grows in temperatures from 33 to 40 °C and pH 7.6-8.0 with an optimal nitrite concentration of 0.35 nM. Nitrospira moscoviensis plays a key role in the two-step Nitrogen Cycle process. The first step of Nitrification requires an ammonia-oxidizing bacterium (AOB) or ammonia-oxidizing archaeon (AOA) followed by a nitrite-oxidizing bacterium (NOB). The unique capability of N. moscoviensis to cleave urea into ammonia and carbon dioxide allows for a symbiotic relationship with ammonia-oxidizing microorganisms (AOM) that lack this urease-production ability also known as negative AOM. A correlation in environment preferences between Nitrospira species with nxrB gene encoding the β-subunit of nitro-oxidoreductase and AOM species with amoA gene further confirmed this relationship. N. moscoviensis provides ammonia via hydrolysis of urea to these ammonia-oxidizing microorganisms which in turn produce nitrite, the primary energy source of N. moscoviensis. The relationship between ureolytic nitrite-oxidizing bacteria and negative AOM is called reciprocal feeding. Thus far, Nitrospira species have been recognized in natural environments as the primary vehicle for nitrite oxidation including soils, activated-sludge, ocean and fresh water, hot springs, and water treatment plants.

== Genomics ==
Following its isolation, N. moscoviensis's genome was sequenced by Dr. Ehrich et al. Its 4.59 Mb genome has a GC content of 56.9+/-0.4 mol% with a predicted 4,863 coding sequences. N. moscoviensis's 16S rRNA gene sequences were found to be 88.9% similar to N. marina's. Despite its relatively low similarity to N. marina, N. moscoviensis was classified within the Nitrospirae phylum primarily due to shared morphological features including the presence of an enlarged periplasmic space.

Nitrospira moscoviensis's fully sequenced genome has provided useful phylogenetic insights beyond the scope of 16S rRNA sequence studies. The discovery of the gene encoding the β-subunit of nitrite-oxidoreductase, nxrB, from N. moscoviensis as a functional genetic marker of Nitrospira, not only confirmed previous 16S rRNA phylogenetic classifications within the phylum, but revealed a new understanding of Nitrospira's richness in terrestrial environments. The phylum has expanded from two bacteria, N. marina and N. moscoviensis, to a 6-branched genera composed of a characteristically diverse group of nitrite-oxidizing bacteria with N. moscoviensis positioned in lineage II.

== Biotechnology ==
The cytoplasm of Nitrospira moscoviensis contains polyhydroxybutyrate (PHB) granules.
