= Lithoautotroph =

Microbe which derives energy from minerals

A lithoautotroph is an organism that derives energy from reactions of reduced compounds of mineral (inorganic) origin. Two types of lithoautotrophs are distinguished by their energy source; photolithoautotrophs derive their energy from light, while chemolithoautotrophs (chemolithotrophs or chemoautotrophs) derive their energy from chemical reactions. Chemolithoautotrophs are exclusively microbes. Photolithoautotrophs include macroflora such as plants; these do not possess the ability to use mineral sources of reduced compounds for energy. Most chemolithoautotrophs belong to the domain Bacteria, while some belong to the domain Archaea. Lithoautotrophic bacteria can only use inorganic molecules as substrates in their energy-releasing reactions. The term "lithotroph" is from Greek lithos (λίθος) meaning "rock" and trōphos (τροφοσ) meaning "consumer"; literally, it may be read "eaters of rock." The "lithotroph" part of the name refers to the fact that these organisms use inorganic elements/compounds as their electron source, while the "autotroph" part of the name refers to their carbon source being CO_{2}. Many lithoautotrophs are extremophiles, but this is not universally so, and some can be found to be the cause of acid mine drainage.

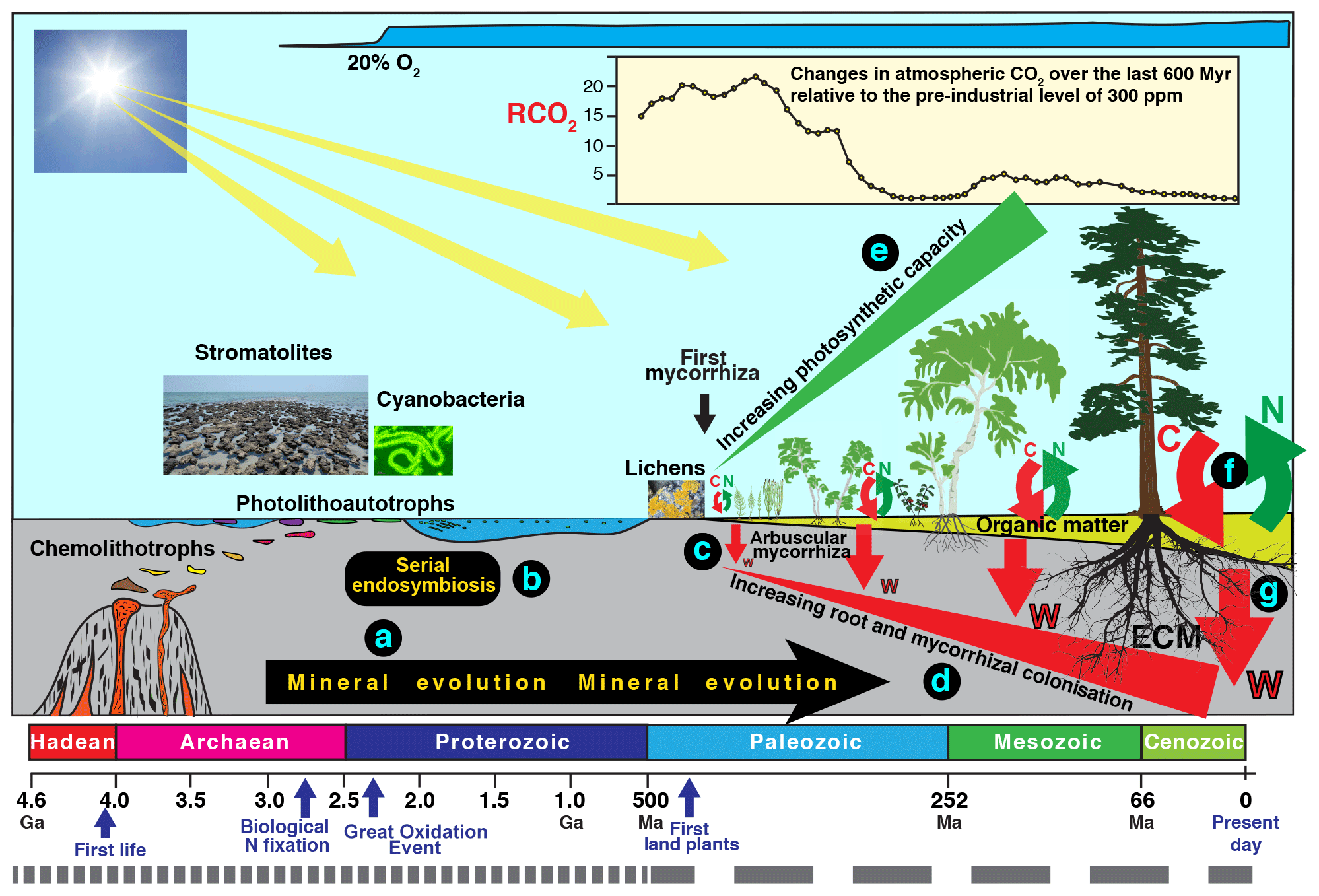
The different types of organisms involved in biological weathering of the Earth's crust and a timescale for their evolution.

Lithoautotrophs are extremely specific in their source of reduced compounds. Thus, despite the diversity in using inorganic compounds that lithoautotrophs exhibit as a group, one particular lithoautotroph would use only one type of inorganic molecule to get its energy. A chemolithotrophic example is anaerobic ammonia oxidizing bacteria (anammox), which uses ammonia and nitrite to produce dinitrogen (N_{2}). Additionally, in July 2020, researchers reported the discovery of chemolithoautotrophic bacterial cultures that feed on the metal manganese after performing unrelated experiments and named their bacterial species Candidatus Manganitrophus noduliformans and Ramlibacter lithotrophicus.

== Metabolism ==
Some chemolithotrophs use redox half-reactions with low reduction potentials for their metabolisms, meaning that they do not harvest a lot of energy compared to organisms that use organotrophic pathways. This leads some chemolithotrophs, such as Nitrosomonas, to be unable to reduce NAD^{+} directly; therefore, these organisms rely on reverse electron transport to reduce NAD^{+} and form NADH and H^{+}.

== Geological processes ==
Lithoautotrophs participate in many geological processes, such as the weathering of parent material (bedrock) to form soil, as well as biogeochemical cycling of sulfur, potassium, and other elements. The existence of undiscovered strains of microbial lithoautotrophs is theorized based on some of these cycles, as they are needed to explain phenomena like the conversion of ammonium in iron-reducing environments. Lithoautotrophs may be present in the deep terrestrial subsurface (they have been found well over 3 km below the surface of the planet), in soils, and in endolith communities. As they are responsible for the liberation of many crucial nutrients, and participate in the formation of soil, lithoautotrophs play a crucial role in the maintenance of life on Earth. For example, the nitrogen cycle is influenced by the activity of ammonium-oxidizing archaea, anammox bacteria, and complete ammonium-oxidizing (comammox) bacteria of the genus Nitrospira.

Several environmental hazards, such as ammonium (NH_{4}^{+}), hydrogen sulfide (H_{2}S), and the greenhouse gas methane (CH_{4}), may be converted by chemolithoautotrophs into forms that are less environmentally harmful, such as N_{2}, SO_{4}^{2-}, and CO_{2}. Although it was long believed that these organisms required oxygen to make these conversions, recent literature suggests that anaerobic oxidation also exists for these systems.

== Acid mine drainage ==
Lithoautotrophic microbial consortia are responsible for the phenomenon known as acid mine drainage, whereby pyrite present in mine tailing heaps and in exposed rock faces is metabolized, using oxygen, to produce sulfites, which form potentially corrosive sulfuric acid when dissolved in water and exposed to aerial oxygen. Acid mine drainage drastically alters the acidity and chemistry of groundwater and streams and may endanger plant and animal populations. Activity similar to acid mine drainage, but on a much lower scale, is also found in natural conditions such as the rocky beds of glaciers, in soil and talus, and in the deep subsurface.

== See also ==
- Sulfur cycle - pathways sulfur travels on Earth
- Redox - reactions governing much of energy metabolism and other chemical processes on Earth
