= Nitrous-oxide reductase =

Class of enzymes

nitrous oxide reductase
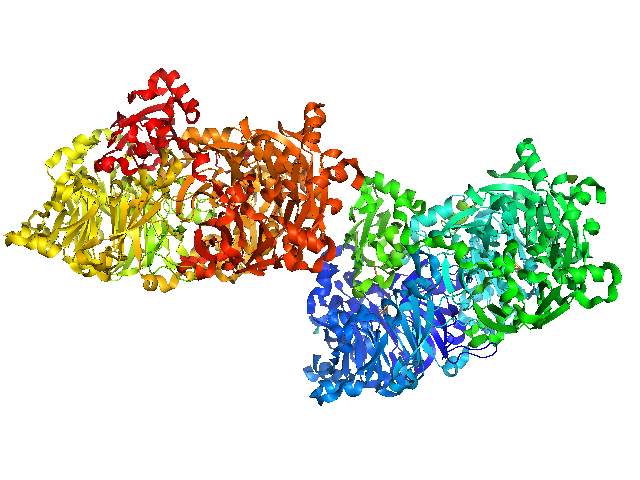

Identifiers
- EC no.: 1.7.2.4
- CAS no.: 55576-44-8

Databases
- BRENDA: enzyme data
- ExPASy: NiceZyme view
- KEGG: enzyme entry
- MetaCyc: metabolic pathway
- Rhea: reactions
- PDB structures: RCSB PDB PDBe PDBsum
- Gene Ontology: AmiGO / QuickGO
Search
- PMC: articles
- PubMed: articles
- NCBI: proteins

In enzymology, a nitrous oxide reductase also known as nitrogen:acceptor oxidoreductase (N_{2}O-forming) is an enzyme that catalyzes the final step in bacterial denitrification, the reduction of nitrous oxide to dinitrogen.

N_{2}O + 2 reduced cytochome c ⇌ N_{2} + H_{2}O + 2 cytochrome c

It plays a critical role in preventing release of a potent greenhouse gas into the atmosphere.

== Function ==
N_{2}O is an inorganic metabolite of the prokaryotic cell during denitrification. Thus, denitrifiers comprise the principal group of N_{2}O producers, with roles played also by nitrifiers, methanotrophic bacteria, and fungi. Among them, only denitrifying prokaryotes have the ability to convert N_{2}O to N_{2}. Conversion of N_{2}O into N_{2} is the last step of a complete nitrate denitrification process and is an autonomous form of respiration. N_{2}O is generated in the denitrifying cell by the activity of respiratory NO reductase. Some microbial communities only have the capability of N_{2}O reduction to N_{2} and do not possess the other denitrification pathways. Such communities are known as nitrous oxide reducers. Some denitrifiers do not have complete denitrification with end product N_{2}O

== Structure ==
Nitrous-oxide reductase is a homodimer that is located in the bacterial periplasm. X-ray structures of the enzymes from Pseudomonas nautica and Paracoccus denitrificans have revealed that each subunit (MW=65 kDa) is organized into two domains. One cupredoxin-like domain contains a binuclear copper protein known as Cu_{A}.

The second domain comprises a 7-bladed propeller of β-sheets that contains the catalytic site called Cu_{Z}, which is a tetranuclear copper-sulfide cluster. The distance between the Cu_{A} and Cu_{Z} centers within a single subunit is greater than 30Å, a distance that precludes physiologically relevant rates of intra-subunit electron transfer. However, the two subunits are orientated "head to tail" such that the Cu_{A} center in one subunit lies only 10 Å from the Cu_{Z} center in the second ensuring that pairs of redox centers in opposite subunits form the catalytically competent unit. The Cu_{A} center can undergo a one-electron redox change and hence has a function similar to that in the well-known aa_{3}-type cytochrome c oxidases (EC 1.9.3.1) where it serves to receive an electron from soluble cytochromes c.

== Inhibitors ==
Acetylene is the most specific inhibitor of nitrous-oxide reductase. Other inhibitors include azide anion, thiocyanate, carbon monoxide, iodide, and cyanide.
