= Moscoviensis =

Moscoviensis may refer to:

- Mordella moscoviensis, species of beetle
- Nitrospira moscoviensis, species of bacteria
