= Simultaneous nitrification–denitrification =

Simultaneous nitrification–denitrification (SNdN) is a wastewater treatment process. Microbial simultaneous nitrification-denitrification is the conversion of the ammonium ion to nitrogen gas in a single bioreactor. The process is dependent on floc characteristics, reaction kinetics, mass loading of readily biodegradable chemical oxygen demand {rbCOD}, and the dissolved oxygen {DO} concentration.

== Microbiology ==
The oxidation of the ammonium to nitrogen gas has been achieved with attached growth and suspended growth wastewater treatment processes. The most common bacteria responsible for the two step conversion are the autotrophic organisms, Nitrosomonas and Nitrobacter, and many different heterotrophs. The former obtain energy from the oxidation of ammonia, obtain carbon from CO_{2}, and use oxygen as the electron acceptor. They are termed autotrophic because of their carbon source and termed aerobes because of their aerobic environment. The heterotrophic organisms are responsible for denitrification or the reduction of nitrate, NO_{3}^{−}, to nitrogen gas, N_{2}. They use carbon from complex organic compounds, prefer low to zero dissolved oxygen, and use nitrate as the electron acceptor.

== Systems Design ==
The most common design uses two different basins: one catering to the autotrophic bacteria and the second to the heterotrophic bacteria. However, SNdN accommodates to both in one basin with strict control of DO. This has been done in two common approaches. One is to develop an oxygen gradient by adding oxygen in one location in the basin. Near the O2 injection point, a high DO concentration is maintained allowing for nitrification and oxidation of other organic compounds. Oxygen is the electron acceptor and is depleted. The DO level in localized environments decreases with increasing distance from the injection point. In these low DO locations, the heterotrophic bacteria complete the nitrogen removal. The Orbal process is a technology in practice today using this method. The other method is to produce an oxygen gradient within the bio floc. The DO concentration remains high in the outside rings of the floc where nitrification occurs but low in the inner rings of the floc where denitrification occurs. This method is dependent on the floc size and characteristics; however controlling flocs is not well understood and is an active field of study

Typically, SNdN has slower ammonia and nitrate utilization rates as compared to separate basin designs because only a fraction of the total biomass is participating in either the nitrification or the denitrification steps. The SNdN limitation due to partial active biomass has led to research in novel bacteria and system designs. Huang achieved significant ammonia removal in an attached growth process with ciliated columns packed with granular sulfur where the denitrifying bacteria used the sulfur as the electron donor and nitrate as the electron acceptor. Another well established pathway is via autotrophic denitrifying bacteria in the process termed the Anammox process. It is typically used for high ammonia strength wastewater.
