= Denitrifying bacteria =

Bacteria using nitrate and nitrite as a terminal electron acceptor

Denitrifying bacteria are a diverse group of bacteria that encompass many different phyla. This group of bacteria, together with denitrifying fungi and archaea, is capable of performing denitrification as part of the nitrogen cycle. Denitrification is performed by a variety of denitrifying bacteria that are widely distributed in soils and sediments and that use oxidized nitrogen compounds such as nitrate and nitrite in the absence of oxygen as a terminal electron acceptor. They metabolize nitrogenous compounds using various enzymes, including nitrate reductase (NAR), nitrite reductase (NIR), nitric oxide reductase (NOR) and nitrous oxide reductase (NOS), turning nitrogen oxides back to nitrogen gas (N_{2}) or nitrous oxide (N_{2}O). The reducing power can be supplied by organic carbon compounds (termed "heterotrophic denitrification") or inorganic substances such as hydrogen, reduced iron, or sulfur species (termed "autotrophic denitrification"). Some microbes can use either organic or inorganic sources of reducing power (termed "mixotrophs").

== Diversity of denitrifying bacteria ==
There is a great diversity in biological traits. Denitrifying bacteria have been identified in over 50 genera with over 125 different species and are estimated to represent 10-15% of bacteria population in water, soil and sediment.

Denitrifying include for example several species of Pseudomonas, Alcaligenes, Bacillus and others.

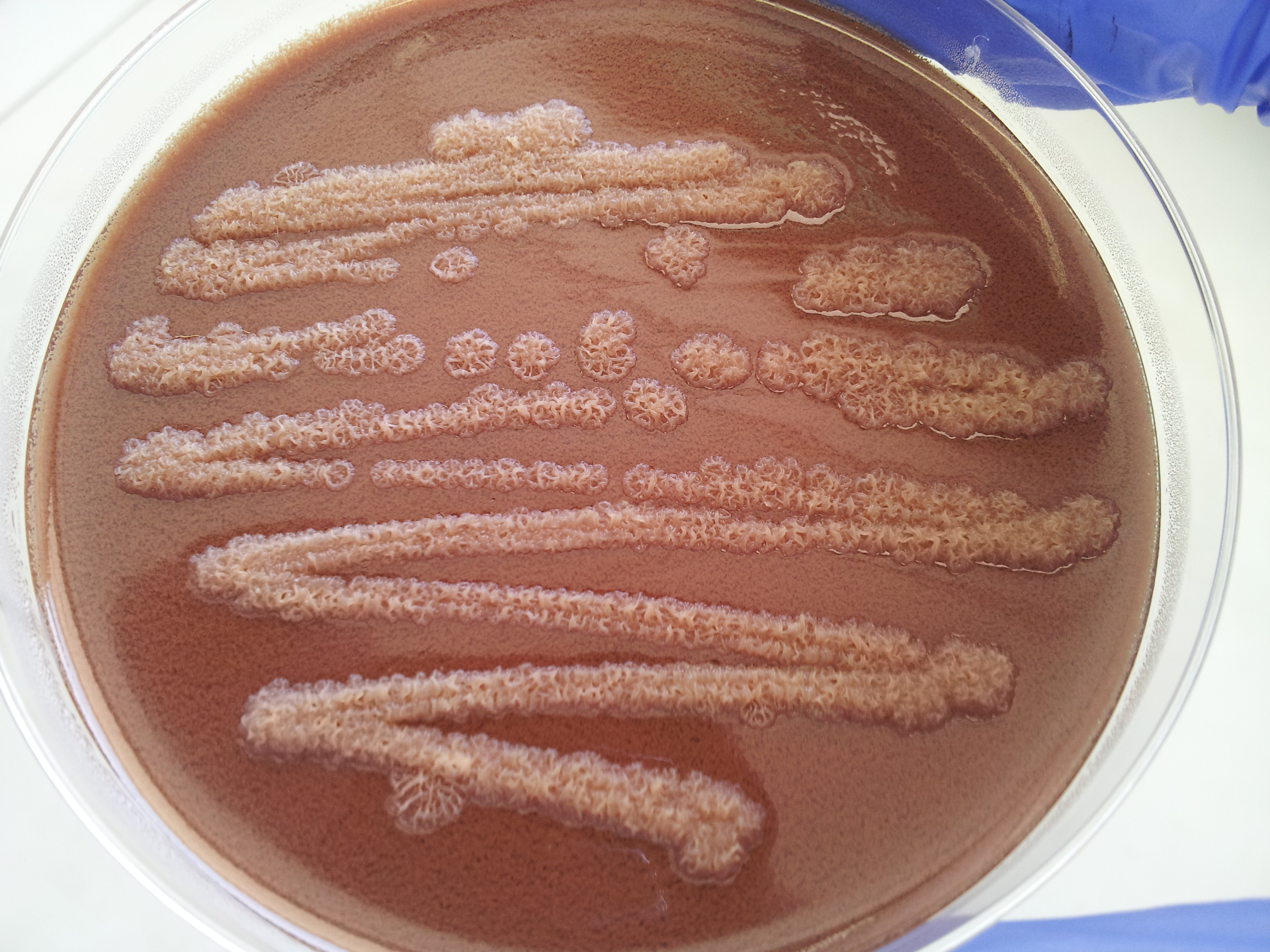
Pseudomonas stutzeri, a species of denitrifying bacteria

The majority of denitrifying bacteria are facultative aerobic heterotrophs that switch from aerobic respiration to denitrification when oxygen as an available terminal electron acceptor (TEA) runs out. This forces the organism to use nitrate to be used as a TEA. Because the diversity of denitrifying bacteria is so large, this group can thrive in a wide range of habitats including some extreme environments such as environments that are highly saline and high in temperature. Aerobic denitrifiers can conduct an aerobic respiratory process in which nitrate is converted gradually to N_{2} (NO_{3}^{−} → NO_{2}^{−} → NO → N_{2}O → N_{2} ), using nitrate reductase (Nar or Nap), nitrite reductase (Nir), nitric oxide reductase (Nor), and nitrous oxide reductase (Nos). Phylogenetic analysis revealed that aerobic denitrifiers mainly belong to α-, β- and γ-Proteobacteria.

== Denitrification mechanism ==
Denitrifying bacteria use denitrification to generate ATP.

The most common denitrification process is outlined below, with the nitrogen oxides being converted back to gaseous nitrogen:

2 NO_{3}^{−} + 10 e^{−} + 12 H^{+} → N_{2} + 6 H_{2}O

The result is one molecule of nitrogen and six molecules of water. Denitrifying bacteria are a part of the N cycle, and consists of sending the N back into the atmosphere. The reaction above is the overall half reaction of the process of denitrification. The reaction can be further divided into different half reactions each requiring a specific enzyme. The transformation from nitrate to nitrite is performed by nitrate reductase (Nar)

NO_{3}^{−} + 2 H^{+} + 2 e^{−} → NO_{2}^{−} + H_{2}O

Nitrite reductase (Nir) then converts nitrite into nitric oxide

2 NO_{2}^{−} + 4 H^{+} + 2 e^{−} → 2 NO + 2 H_{2}O

Nitric oxide reductase (Nor) then converts nitric oxide into nitrous oxide

2 NO + 2 H^{+} + 2 e^{−} → N_{2}O + H_{2}O

Nitrous oxide reductase (Nos) terminates the reaction by converting nitrous oxide into dinitrogen

N_{2}O + 2 H^{+} + 2 e^{−} → N_{2} + H_{2}O

Any of the products produced at any step can be exchanged with the soil environment.

== Oxidation of methane and denitrification ==
=== Anaerobic oxidation of methane coupled to denitrification ===
Anaerobic denitrification coupled to methane oxidation was first observed in 2008, with the isolation of a methane-oxidizing bacterial strain found to oxidize methane independently. This process uses the excess electrons from methane oxidation to reduce nitrates, effectively removing both fixed nitrogen and methane from aquatic systems in habitats ranging from sediment to peat bogs to stratified water columns.

The process of anaerobic denitrification may contribute significantly to the global methane and nitrogen cycles, especially in light of the recent influx of both due to anthropogenic changes. The extent to which anthropogenic methane affects the atmosphere is known to be a significant driver of climate change, and considering it is multiple times more potent than carbon dioxide. Removing methane is widely considered to be beneficial to the environment, although the extent of the role that denitrification plays in the global flux of methane is not well understood. Anaerobic denitrification as a mechanism has been shown to be capable of removing the excess nitrate caused by fertilizer runoff, even in hypoxic conditions.

Additionally, microorganisms which employ this type of metabolism may be employed in bioremediation, as shown by a 2006 study of hydrocarbon contamination in the Antarctic, as well as a 2016 study which successfully increased the rates of denitrification by altering the environment housing the bacteria. Denitrifying bacteria are said to be high quality bioremediators because of their adaptability to a variety of different environments, as well as the lacking any toxic or undesirable leftovers, as are left by other metabolisms.

=== Role of denitrifying bacteria as a methane sink ===
Denitrifying bacteria have been found to play a significant role in the oxidation of methane (CH_{4}) (where methane is converted to CO_{2}, water, and energy) in deep freshwater bodies of water. This is important because methane is the second most significant anthropogenic greenhouse gas, with a global warming potential 25 times more potent than that of carbon dioxide, and freshwaters are a major contributor of global methane emissions.

A study conducted on Europe's Lake Constance found that anaerobic methane oxidation coupled to denitrification – also referred to as nitrate/nitrite-dependent anaerobic methane oxidation (n-damo) – is a dominant sink of methane in deep lakes. For a long time, it was considered that the mitigation of methane emissions was only due to aerobic methanotrophic bacteria. However, methane oxidation also takes place in anoxic, or oxygen depleted zones, of freshwater bodies. In the case of Lake Constance, this is carried out by M. oxyfera-like bacteria. M. oxyfera-like bacteria are bacteria similar to Candidatus Methylomirabilis oxyfera, which is a species of bacteria that acts as a denitrifying methanotroph.

The results from the study on Lake Constance found that nitrate was depleted in the water at the same depth as methane, which suggests that methane oxidation was coupled to denitrification. It could be inferred that it was M. oxyfera-like bacteria carrying out the methane oxidation because their abundance peaked at the same depth where the methane and nitrate profiles met. This n-damo process is significant because it aids in decreasing methane emissions from deep freshwater bodies and it aids in turning nitrates into nitrogen gas, reducing excess nitrates.

== Denitrifying bacteria and the environment ==
=== Denitrification effects on limiting plant productivity and producing by-products ===
The process of denitrification can lower the fertility of soil as nitrogen, a growth-limiting factor, is removed from the soil and lost to the atmosphere. This loss of nitrogen to the atmosphere can eventually be regained via introduced nutrients, as part of the nitrogen cycle. Some nitrogen may also be fixated by species of nitrifying bacteria and the cyanobacteria. Another important environmental issue concerning denitrification is the fact that the process tends to produce large amounts of by-products. Examples of by-products are nitric oxide (NO) and nitrous oxide (N_{2}O). NO is an ozone depleting species and N_{2}O is a potent greenhouse gas which can contribute to global warming.

=== Denitrifying bacteria use in wastewater treatment ===
Denitrifying bacteria are an essential component in treating wastewater. Wastewater often contains large amounts of nitrogen (in the form of ammonium or nitrate), which could be damaging to ecological processes if left untreated. Many physical, chemical, and biological methods have been used to remove the nitrogenous compounds and purify wastewaters. The process and methods vary, but it generally involves converting ammonium to nitrate via the nitrification process with ammonium oxidizing bacteria (AOB, NH_{4}^{+} → NO_{2}^{–}) and nitrite oxidizing bacteria (NOB, NO_{2}^{–} → NO_{3}^{–}), and finally to nitrogen gas via denitrification. One example of this is ammonia-oxidizing bacteria which have a metabolic feature that, in combination with other nitrogen-cycling metabolic activities, such as nitrite oxidation and denitrification, remove nitrogen from wastewater in activated sludge. Since denitrifying bacteria are heterotrophic, an organic carbon source is supplied to the bacteria in an anoxic basin. With no available oxygen, denitrifying bacteria use the redox of nitrate to oxidize the carbon. This leads to the creation of nitrogen gas from nitrate, which then bubbles up out of the wastewater.

== See also ==
- Nitrifying bacteria
- Nitrogen Cycle
