= Nitrospira inopinata =

Scientific classification
- Domain: Bacteria
- Kingdom: Pseudomonadati
- Phylum: Nitrospirota
- Class: Nitrospira
- Order: Nitrospirales
- Family: Nitrospiraceae
- Genus: Nitrospira
- Species: N. inopinata

Binomial name
- Nitrospira inopinata Daims et al. 2015

Species of bacterium

Nitrospira inopinata is a bacterium from the phylum Nitrospirota. This phylum contains nitrite-oxidizing bacteria playing role in nitrification. However N. inopinata was shown to perform complete ammonia oxidation to nitrate thus being the first comammox bacterium to be discovered.

N. inopinata was cultivated in enrichment culture. Initial inoculum was obtained in 2011 from microbial biofilm growing on metal surface of the pipe covered by hot water (56 °C, pH 7.5), which was raised from 1 200m deep oil exploration well. The well was located in Aushiger, North Caucasus, Russia. The growth in pure culture was achieved in 2017.

Genome of N. inopinata was released in 2015 represented by 3.3 Mbp, with 3 116 genes and 59.2% GC content. NCBI accession number is LN885086.
