= Hydroxylamine oxidoreductase =

Identifiers
- EC no.: 1.7.3.4
- CAS no.: 9075-43-8

Databases
- BRENDA: enzyme data
- ExPASy: NiceZyme view
- KEGG: enzyme entry
- MetaCyc: metabolic pathway
- Rhea: reactions
- PDB structures: RCSB PDB PDBe PDBsum
- Gene Ontology: AmiGO / QuickGO
Search
- PMC: articles
- PubMed: articles
- NCBI: proteins

Hydroxylamine oxidoreductase (HAO) is an enzyme found in the prokaryotic genus Nitrosomonas. It plays a critically important role in the biogeochemical nitrogen cycle as part of the metabolism of ammonia-oxidizing bacteria.

The substrate is hydroxylamine ($\ce{NH2OH}$), a chemical produced biologically by the enzyme Ammonia monooxygenase. The products of the catalyzed reaction are debated, but recent work shows compelling evidence for the production of nitric oxide.

== Structural studies ==
Crystallographic methods show that HAO (PDB code: PDB: 1FGJ) is a cross-linked trimer of polypeptides containing 24 heme cofactors.

== Reactivity ==
For many decades the enzyme was thought to catalyze the following reaction:

$$\ce{NH2OH + H2O -> NO2^- + 5 H+ + 4e^-}$$

Recent work in the field, however, reveals that this enzyme catalyzes an entirely different reaction:

$$\ce{NH2OH -> NO + 3H+ + 3e^-}$$

Subsequent oxidation of the nitric oxide to nitrite caused by reaction with oxygen accounts for the reactivity previous described by Hooper et al.

== Environmental impact ==
Nitric oxide, the product of HAO catalysis, is a potent greenhouse gas. Additionally, the oxidized product of nitric oxide in the presence of oxygen is nitrite - a common pollutant in agricultural run-off.
