= Comammox =

Comammox (COMplete AMMonia OXidation) is the name attributed to an organism that can convert ammonia into nitrite and then into nitrate through the process of nitrification. Nitrification has traditionally been thought to be a two-step process, where ammonia-oxidizing bacteria and archaea oxidize ammonia to nitrite and then nitrite-oxidizing bacteria convert to nitrate. Complete conversion of ammonia into nitrate by a single microorganism was first predicted in 2006. In 2015 the presence of microorganisms that could carry out both conversion processes was discovered within the genus Nitrospira, and the nitrogen cycle was updated. Within the genus Nitrospira, the major ecosystems comammox are primarily found in are natural aquifers and engineered ecosystems.

Complete nitrification step yield more energy (∆G°′ = −349 kJ mol^{−1} NH_{3}) than either single oxidation alone (∆G°′ = −275 kJ mol^{−1} NH_{3} for ammonia oxidation to nitrite and ∆G°′ = −74 kJ mol^{−1} NO_{2}^{−} for nitrite oxidation to nitrate).

== Comammox Nitrospira bacteria ==
Complete nitrification of oxidizing ammonia to nitrate is energetically advantageous for Nitrospira. Due to the previous research done on Nitrospira, it was thought that all Nitrospira use nitrite as their energy source. Therefore, comammox Nitrospira were not discovered until 2015. All discovered nitrifiers belong to sublineage II of the genus Nitrospira. The genome of the nitrifying chemolithoautotrophic bacterium from the genus Nitrospira encodes for both ammonia and nitrite oxidation. The genes associated with the growth by ammonia oxidation to nitrate are ammonia monooxygenase and hydroxylamine dehydrogenases genes (e.g. amoA gene and hao cluster). This shows that complete nitrifying Nitrospira serve as cornerstones of the nitrogen-cycling microbial communities found in the environment. Nearly two years after the discovery of comammox organisms, Nitrospira inopinata was the first complete nitrifier to be isolated in pure culture. Kinetic and physiological analysis of Nitrospira inopinata demonstrated that this complete nitrifier has a high affinity for ammonia, slow growth rate, low maximum rate of ammonia oxidation, and high yield. The discovery of comammox Nitrospira provides a view into the modular evolution of the nitrogen cycle and expands upon the complexity of the evolutionary history of nitrification.

== Ecosystem of comammox ==
Comammox have been identified in many ecosystems, including natural freshwater and terrestrial ecosystems. Notably commamox genes were not found to be abundant in oceans. Additionally, the use of engineered ecosystems for comammox could be used for ammonium removal during water and wastewater treatment. Comammox have been found in many engineered systems including aquaculture biofiltration units, drinking water treatment and distribution systems, and wastewater treatment plants. The growth of comammox in these engineered ecosystems co-occur with ammonia-oxidizing bacteria and/or archaea, and in some cases outnumber other ammonia-oxidizing prokaryotes. The ecosystem of comammox is currently unknown in terms of biogeography, including their distribution and abundance, due to the influences of process configuration and chemical composition of the treated wastewater. Following these findings, it was determined that comammox may out-select canonical nitrite oxidizing bacteria in the genus Nitrospira in some engineered environments, suggesting the potentially important role for comammox in efficient biological nitrogen removal in wastewater treatment processes.

== See also ==
- Anammox
