= Pseudomonas mandelii =

Scientific classification
- Domain: Bacteria
- Kingdom: Pseudomonadati
- Phylum: Pseudomonadota
- Class: Gammaproteobacteria
- Order: Pseudomonadales
- Family: Pseudomonadaceae
- Genus: Pseudomonas
- Species: P. mandelii

Binomial name
- Pseudomonas mandelii Verhille et al., 1999

Type strain
- ATCC 700871 CCUG 42058; CFML 95-303; CIP 105273; JCM 21619

Species of bacterium

Pseudomonas mandelii is a fluorescent, Gram-negative, rod-shaped bacterium isolated from natural spring waters in France. Based on 16S rRNA analysis, P. mandelii has been placed in the P. fluorescens group.
