= Cytochrome c nitrite reductase =

Class of enzymes

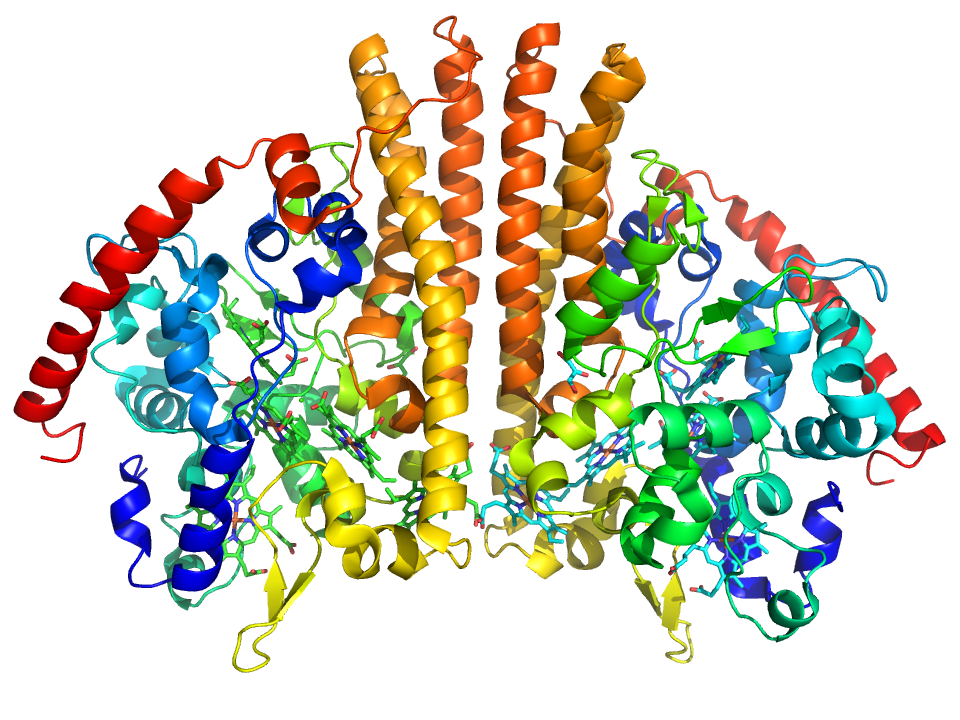
- Crystallographic structure of a homodimer of the cytochrome c nitrite reductase from Escherichia coli (rainbow colored cartoon, blue = N-terminus, red = C-terminus) complexed with heme C (sticks).

Identifiers
- EC no.: 1.7.2.2

Databases
- IntEnz: IntEnz view
- BRENDA: BRENDA entry
- ExPASy: NiceZyme view
- KEGG: KEGG entry
- MetaCyc: metabolic pathway
- PRIAM: profile
- PDB structures: RCSB PDB PDBe PDBsum
- Gene Ontology: AmiGO / QuickGO
Search
- PMC: articles
- PubMed: articles
- NCBI: proteins

Cytochrome c nitrite reductase (ccNiR) (EC 1.7.2.2) is a bacterial enzyme that catalyzes the six electron reduction of nitrite to ammonia; an important step in the biological nitrogen cycle. The enzyme catalyses the second step in the two step conversion of nitrate to ammonia, which allows certain bacteria to use nitrite as a terminal electron acceptor, rather than oxygen, during anaerobic conditions. During this process, ccNiR draws electrons from the quinol pool, which are ultimately provided by a dehydrogenase such as formate dehydrogenase or hydrogenase. These dehydrogenases are responsible for generating a proton motive force.

Cytochrome c Nitrite Reductase is a homodimer which contains five c-type heme cofactors per monomer. Four of the heme centers are bis-histidine ligated and presumably serve to shuttle electrons to the active site. The active site heme, however, is uniquely ligated by a single lysine residue.

This enzyme belongs to the family of oxidoreductases, specifically those acting on other nitrogenous compounds as donors with a cytochrome as acceptor. The systematic name of this enzyme class is ammonia:ferricytochrome-c oxidoreductase.

Cytochrom_NNT

Identifiers
- Symbol: Cytochrom_NNT
- Pfam: PF03264
- Pfam clan: CL0317
- InterPro: IPR005126
- OPM superfamily: 175
- OPM protein: 2j7a
Available protein structures:
- Pfam: structures / ECOD
- PDB: RCSB PDB; PDBe; PDBj
- PDBsum: structure summary
