= Ferredoxin—nitrite reductase =

Class of enzymes

ferredoxin—nitrite reductase

Identifiers
- EC no.: 1.7.7.1
- CAS no.: 37256-44-3

Databases
- IntEnz: IntEnz view
- BRENDA: BRENDA entry
- ExPASy: NiceZyme view
- KEGG: KEGG entry
- MetaCyc: metabolic pathway
- PRIAM: profile
- PDB structures: RCSB PDB PDBe PDBsum
- Gene Ontology: AmiGO / QuickGO
Search
- PMC: articles
- PubMed: articles
- NCBI: proteins

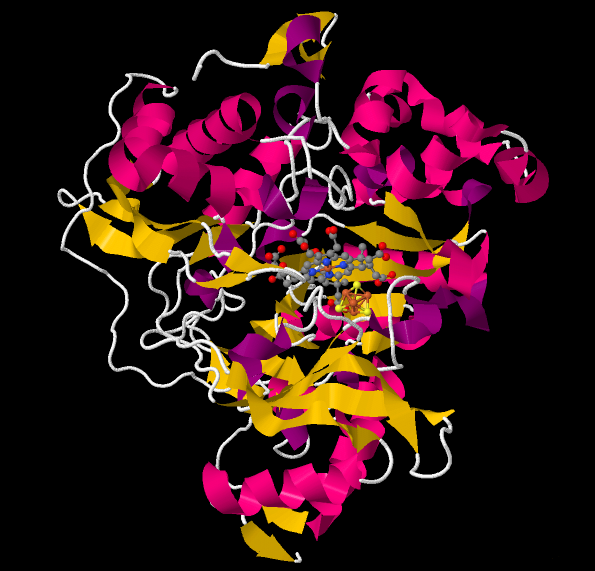
Structure of spinach nitrite reductase Protein chains are colored from the N-terminal to the C-terminal using a rainbow (spectral) color gradient. Made with Jmol. Rendering based on 2AKJ.

In enzymology, a ferredoxin—nitrite reductase (EC 1.7.7.1) is an enzyme that catalyzes the chemical reaction

NH_{3} + 2 H_{2}O + 6 oxidized ferredoxin $\rightleftharpoons$ nitrite + 6 reduced ferredoxin + 7 H^{+}

The 3 substrates of this enzyme are NH_{3}, H_{2}O, and oxidized ferredoxin, whereas its 3 products are nitrite, reduced ferredoxin, and H^{+}.

This enzyme belongs to the family of oxidoreductases, specifically those acting on other nitrogenous compounds as donors with an iron-sulfur protein as acceptor. The systematic name of this enzyme class is ammonia:ferredoxin oxidoreductase. This enzyme participates in nitrogen metabolism and nitrogen assimilation. It has 3 cofactors: iron, Siroheme, and Iron-sulfur.

This enzyme can use many different isoforms of ferredoxin. In photosynthesizing tissues, it uses ferredoxin that is reduced by PSI and in the root it uses a form of ferredoxin (FdIII) that has a less negative midpoint potential and can be reduced easily by NADPH.

== Structural studies ==
As of late 2007, 3 structures have been solved for this class of enzymes, with PDB accession codes 1ZJ8, 1ZJ9, and 2AKJ.

== Literature ==
- Joy KW, Hageman RH (1966). "The purification and properties of nitrite reductase from higher plants, and its dependence on ferredoxin". Biochem. J. 100 (1): 263–73. doi:10.1042/bj1000263. PMC 1265119. PMID 4381617.
- Ramirez JM, Del Campo FF, Paneque A, Losada M (1966). "Ferredoxin-nitrite reductase from spinach". Biochim. Biophys. Acta. 118 (1): 58–71. doi:10.1016/s0926-6593(66)80144-3. PMID 5954064.
- Zumft WG, Paneque A, Aparicio PJ, Losada M (1969). "Mechanism of nitrate reduction in Chlorella". Biochem. Biophys. Res. Commun. 36 (6): 980–6. Bibcode:1969BBRC...36..980Z. doi:10.1016/0006-291X(69)90300-3. PMID 4390523.
