= Hydroxylamine dehydrogenase =

Enzyme

Identifiers
- EC no.: 1.7.2.6
- CAS no.: 9075-43-8

Databases
- IntEnz: IntEnz view
- BRENDA: BRENDA entry
- ExPASy: NiceZyme view
- KEGG: KEGG entry
- MetaCyc: metabolic pathway
- PRIAM: profile
- PDB structures: RCSB PDB PDBe PDBsum
Search
- PMC: articles
- PubMed: articles
- NCBI: proteins

Hydroxylamine dehydrogenase (EC 1.7.2.6, HAO (ambiguous)) is an enzyme with systematic name hydroxylamine:ferricytochrome-c oxidoreductase. This enzyme catalyses the following chemical reaction

(1) hydroxylamine + H_{2}O + 2 ferricytochrome c $\rightleftharpoons$ nitrite + 2 ferrocytochrome c + 5 H^{+}
(2) hydroxylamine + ferricytochrome c $\rightleftharpoons$ nitric oxide + ferrocytochrome c + 3 H^{+}

The enzymes from the nitrifying bacterium Nitrosomonas europaea and the methylotrophic bacterium Methylococcus capsulatus are hemoproteins.
