= Nitrosococcus =

Scientific classification
- Domain: Bacteria
- Kingdom: Pseudomonadati
- Phylum: Pseudomonadota
- Class: Gammaproteobacteria
- Order: Chromatiales
- Family: Chromatiaceae
- Genus: Nitrosococcus; Winogradsky 1892 (Approved Lists 1980)

Type species
- Nitrosococcus nitrosus (Migula 1900) Buchanan 1925 (Approved Lists 1980)

Species
- "Nitrosococcus halophilus" Campbell et al. 2011; "Nitrosococcus mobilis" Koops et al. 1976; Nitrosococcus nitrosus (Migula 1900) Buchanan 1925 (Approved Lists 1980); Nitrosococcus oceani corrig. (Watson 1965) Watson 1971 (Approved Lists 1980); "Nitrosococcus wardiae" Wang et al. 2016; "Nitrosococcus watsonii" Campbell et al. 2011

Synonyms
- "Nitrosocystis Watson 1965

Genus of bacteria

Nitrosococcus is a genus of Gram-negative bacteria. It is an ammonia-oxidizing bacterium which oxidizes ammonia into nitrite. Nitrosococcus can be found in marine environments and salt lakes.
