= Denitrification =

Reduction of nitrate as a form of anaerobic respiration

Nitrogen cycle.

Denitrification is a microbially facilitated process where nitrate (NO_{3}^{−}) is reduced and ultimately produces molecular nitrogen (N_{2}) through a series of intermediate gaseous nitrogen oxide products. Facultative anaerobic bacteria perform denitrification as a type of respiration that reduces oxidized forms of nitrogen in response to the oxidation of an electron donor such as organic matter. The preferred nitrogen electron acceptors in order of most to least thermodynamically favorable include nitrate (NO_{3}^{−}), nitrite (NO_{2}^{−}), nitric oxide (NO), nitrous oxide (N_{2}O), finally resulting in the production of N_{2}, completing the nitrogen cycle. They use hydrogen gas, or reduced sulfur. Denitrification can leak N_{2}O, which is an ozone-depleting substance.

The process is primarily made up of heterotrophic bacteria (such as Paracoccus denitrificans and various pseudomonads), although autotrophic denitrifiers have also been identified (e.g., Thiobacillus denitrificans). Denitrifiers are represented in all main phylogenetic groups. Generally, several species of bacteria are involved in the complete reduction of NO_{3}^{−} to N_{2}, and more than one enzymatic pathway has been identified in the reduction process. The denitrification process does not only provide energy to the organism performing nitrate reduction to dinitrogen gas, but also some anaerobic ciliates can use denitrifying endosymbionts to gain energy similar to the use of mitochondria in oxygen respiring organisms.

Direct reduction from nitrate to ammonium, a process known as dissimilatory nitrate reduction to ammonium or DNRA, is also possible for organisms that have the nrf-gene. This is less common than denitrification in most ecosystems as a means of nitrate reduction. Other genes known in microorganisms which denitrify include nir (nitrite reductase) and nos (nitrous oxide reductase) among others; organisms identified as having these genes include Alcaligenes faecalis, Alcaligenes xylosoxidans, many in the genus Pseudomonas, Bradyrhizobium japonicum, and Blastobacter denitrificans.

== Overview ==
=== Half reactions ===
Denitrification generally proceeds through some combination of the following half reactions, with the enzyme catalyzing the reaction in parentheses:

- NO_{3}^{−} + 2 H^{+} + 2 e^{−} → NO_{2}^{−} + H_{2}O (Nitrate reductase)
- NO_{2}^{−} + 2 H^{+} + e^{−} → NO + H_{2}O (Nitrite reductase)
- 2 NO + 2 H^{+} + 2 e^{−} → N_{2}O + H_{2}O (Nitric-oxide reductase)
- N_{2}O + 2 H^{+} + 2 e^{−} → N_{2} + H_{2}O (Nitrous-oxide reductase)

The complete process can be expressed as a net balanced redox reaction, where nitrate (NO_{3}^{−}) gets fully reduced to dinitrogen (N_{2}):

- 2 NO_{3}^{−} + 10 e^{−} + 12 H^{+} → N_{2} + 6 H_{2}O

=== Conditions of denitrification ===
In nature, denitrification can take place in both terrestrial and marine ecosystems. Typically, denitrification occurs in anoxic environments, where the concentration of dissolved and freely available oxygen is depleted. In these areas, nitrate (NO_{3}^{−}) or nitrite (NO_{2}^{−}) can be used as a substitute terminal electron acceptor instead of oxygen (O_{2}), a more energetically favourable electron acceptor. Terminal electron acceptor is a compound that gets reduced in the reaction by receiving electrons. Examples of anoxic environments can include soils, groundwater, wetlands, oil reservoirs, poorly ventilated corners of the ocean and seafloor sediments.

Furthermore, denitrification can occur in oxic environments as well. High activity of denitrifiers can be observed in the intertidal zones, where the tidal cycles cause fluctuations of oxygen concentration in sandy coastal sediments. For example, the bacterial species Paracoccus denitrificans engages in denitrification under both oxic and anoxic conditions simultaneously. Upon oxygen exposure, the bacteria is able to utilize nitrous oxide reductase, an enzyme that catalyzes the last step of denitrification. Aerobic denitrifiers are mainly Gram-negative bacteria in the phylum Proteobacteria. Enzymes NapAB, NirS, NirK and NosZ are located in the periplasm, a wide space bordered by the cytoplasmic and the outer membrane in Gram-negative bacteria.

A variety of environmental factors can influence the rate of denitrification on an ecosystem-wide scale. For example, temperature and pH have been observed to impact denitrification rates. In the bacterial species, Pseudomonas mandelii, expression of denitrifying genes was reduced at temperatures below 30 °C and a pH below 5, while activity was largely unaffected between a pH of 6–8. Organic carbon as an electron donor is a common limiting nutrient for denitrification as observed in benthic sediments and wetlands. Nitrate and oxygen can also be potential limiting factors for denitrification, although the latter only has an observed limiting effect in wet soils. Oxygen likely affects denitrification in multiple ways—because most denitrifiers are facultative, oxygen can inhibit rates, but it can also stimulate denitrification by facilitating nitrification and the production of nitrate. In wetlands as well as deserts, moisture is an environmental limitation to rates of denitrification.

Additionally, environmental factors can also influence whether denitrification proceeds to completion, characterized by the complete reduction of NO_{3}^{−} to N_{2} rather than releasing N_{2}O as an end product. Soil pH and texture are both factors that can moderate denitrification, with higher pH levels driving the reaction more to completion. Nutrient composition, particularly the ratio of carbon to nitrogen, is a strong contributor to complete denitrification, with a 2:1 ratio of C:N being able to facilitate full nitrate reduction regardless of temperature or carbon source. Copper, as a co-factor for nitrite reductase and nitrous-oxide reductase, also promoted complete denitrification when added as a supplement. Besides nutrients and terrain, microbial community composition can also affect the ratio of complete denitrification, with prokaryotic phyla Actinomycetota and Thermoproteota being responsible for greater release of N_{2} than N_{2}O compared to other prokaryotes.

Denitrification can lead to a condition called isotopic fractionation in the soil environment. The two stable isotopes of nitrogen, ^{14}N and ^{15}N are both found in the sediment profiles. The lighter isotope of nitrogen, ^{14}N, is preferred during denitrification, leaving the heavier nitrogen isotope, ^{15}N, in the residual matter. This selectivity leads to the enrichment of ^{14}N in the biomass compared to ^{15}N. Moreover, the relative abundance of ^{14}N can be analyzed to distinguish denitrification apart from other processes in nature.

== Use in wastewater treatment ==
Denitrification is commonly used to remove nitrogen from sewage and municipal wastewater. It is also an instrumental process in constructed wetlands and riparian zones for the prevention of groundwater pollution with nitrate resulting from excessive agricultural or residential fertilizer usage. Wood chip bioreactors have been studied since the 2000s and are effective in removing nitrate from agricultural run off and even manure.

Reduction under anoxic conditions can also occur through process called anaerobic ammonium oxidation (anammox):

NH_{4}^{+} + NO_{2}^{−} → N_{2} + 2 H_{2}O

In some wastewater treatment plants, compounds such as methanol, ethanol, acetate, glycerin, or proprietary products are added to the wastewater to provide a carbon and electron source for denitrifying bacteria. The microbial ecology of such engineered denitrification processes is determined by the nature of the electron donor and the process operating conditions. Denitrification processes are also used in the treatment of industrial wastewater. Many denitrifying bioreactor types and designs are available commercially for the industrial applications, including Electro-Biochemical Reactors (EBRs), membrane bioreactors (MBRs), and moving bed bioreactors (MBBRs).

Aerobic denitrification, conducted by aerobic denitrifiers, may offer the potential to eliminate the need for separate tanks and reduce sludge yield. There are less stringent alkalinity requirements because alkalinity generated during denitrification can partly compensate for the alkalinity consumption in nitrification.

== Non-biological denitrification ==
A variety of non-biological methods can remove nitrate. These include methods that can destroy nitrogen compounds, such as chemical and electrochemical methods, and those that selectively transfer nitrate to a concentrated waste stream, such as ion exchange or reverse osmosis. Chemical removal of nitrate can occur through advanced oxidation processes, although it may produce hazardous byproducts. Electrochemical methods can remove nitrate by via a voltage applied across electrodes, with degradation usually occurring at the cathode. Effective cathode materials include transition metals, post transition metals, and semi-conductors like TiO_{2}. Electrochemical methods can often avoid requiring costly chemical additives, but their effectiveness can be constrained by the pH and ions present. Reverse osmosis is highly effective in removing small charged solutes like nitrate, but it may also remove desirable nutrients, create large volumes of wastewater, and require increased pumping pressures. Ion exchange can selectively remove nitrate from water without large waste streams, but do require regeneration and may face challenges with absorption of undesired ions.

== See also ==
- Aerobic denitrification
- Anaerobic respiration
- Bioremediation
- Climate change
- Hypoxia (environmental)
- Nitrogen fixation
- Simultaneous nitrification-denitrification
