= Ammonia monooxygenase =

Identifiers
- EC no.: 1.14.99.39

Databases
- BRENDA: enzyme data
- ExPASy: NiceZyme view
- KEGG: enzyme entry
- MetaCyc: metabolic pathway
- Rhea: reactions
- PDB structures: RCSB PDB PDBe PDBsum
Search
- PMC: articles
- PubMed: articles
- NCBI: proteins

Ammonia monooxygenase (EC 1.14.99.39, AMO) is an enzyme, which catalyses the following chemical reaction:

NH_{3} + AH_{2} + O_{2} $\rightleftharpoons$ NH_{2}OH + A + H_{2}O

Ammonia monooxygenase contains copper and possibly nonheme iron. AMO is the first enzyme in ammonia oxidation. Aerobic oxidation of ammonia to hydroxylamine via AMO is an endergonic reaction. So, all aerobic ammonia oxidizing organisms conserve energy by further oxidizing hydroxylamine. It was believed that aerobic ammonia-oxidizing bacteria oxidize hydroxylamine to nitrite using octahaem hydroxylamine oxidoreductase (HAO). Recently, it was shown that the product of HAO is not nitrite but nitric oxide, which is further oxidized to nitrite by an unknown enzyme.
