= Nitrite =

The anion form of nitrogen dioxide

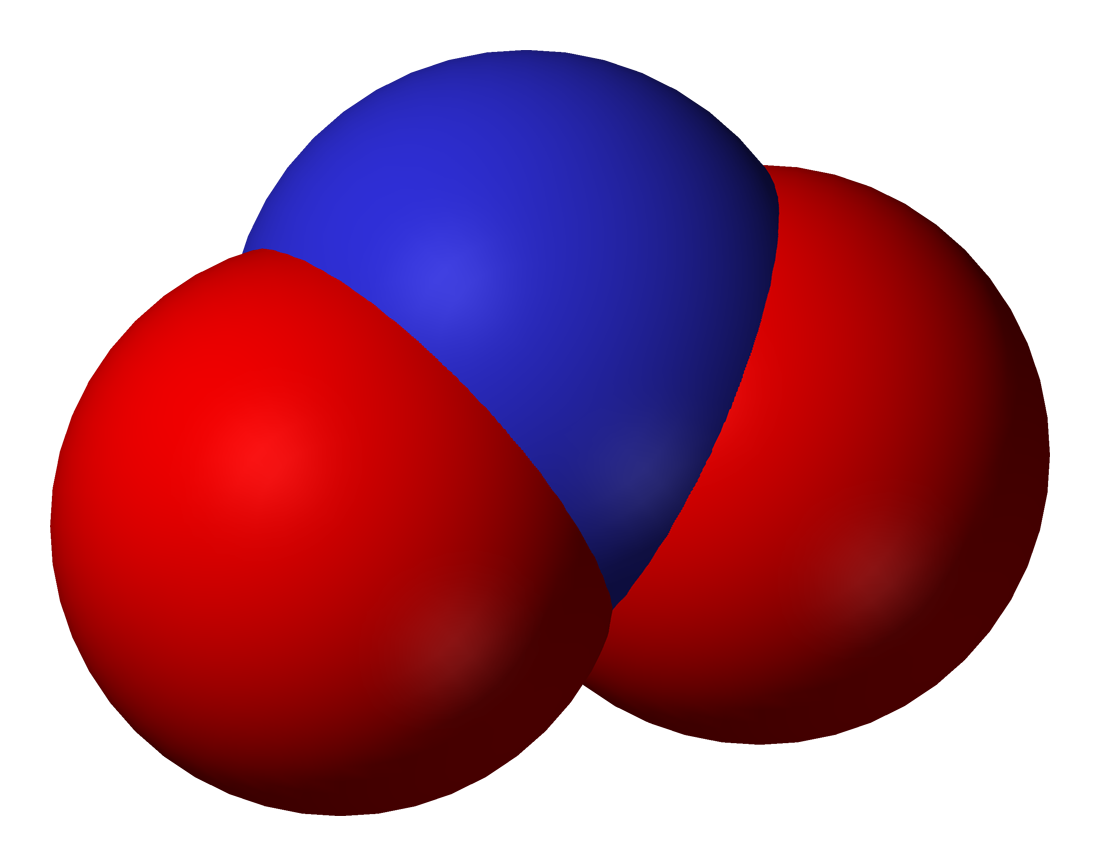

Names
- IUPAC name Nitrite
- Systematic IUPAC name dioxidonitrate(1−)

Identifiers
CAS Number	14797-65-0
3D model (JSmol)	Interactive image
ChEBI	CHEBI:16301
ChemSpider	921
EC Number	233-272-6
PubChem CID	946
UNII	J39976L608
- InChI: InChI=1S/HNO2/c2-1-3/h(H,2,3)/p-1 Key: IOVCWXUNBOPUCH-UHFFFAOYSA-M; InChI=1/HNO2/c2-1-3/h(H,2,3)/p-1 Key: IOVCWXUNBOPUCH-REWHXWOFAR
- SMILES: N(=O)[O-]

Properties
Chemical formula	NO_{2}^{–}
Molar mass	46.005 g·mol^{−1}
Conjugate acid	Nitrous acid
- Except where otherwise noted, data are given for materials in their standard state (at 25 °C [77 °F], 100 kPa). Infobox references

The nitrite ion has the chemical formula NO_{2}^{–}. Nitrite (mostly sodium nitrite) is widely used throughout chemical and pharmaceutical industries. The nitrite anion is a pervasive intermediate in the nitrogen cycle in nature. The name nitrite also refers to organic compounds having the –ONO group, which are esters of nitrous acid.

== Production ==
Sodium nitrite is made industrially by passing a mixture of nitrogen oxides into aqueous sodium hydroxide or sodium carbonate solution:

NO + NO_{2} + 2 NaOH → 2 NaNO_{2} + H_{2}O
NO + NO_{2} + Na_{2}CO_{3} → 2 NaNO_{2} + CO_{2}

The product is purified by recrystallization. Alkali metal nitrites are thermally stable up to and beyond their melting point (441 °C (826 °F) for KNO_{2}). Ammonium nitrite can be made from dinitrogen trioxide, N_{2}O_{3}, which is formally the anhydride of nitrous acid:

2 NH_{3} + H_{2}O + N_{2}O_{3} → 2 NH_{4}NO_{2}

== Structure ==
The two canonical structures of NO_{2}^{–}, which contribute to the resonance hybrid for the nitrite ion

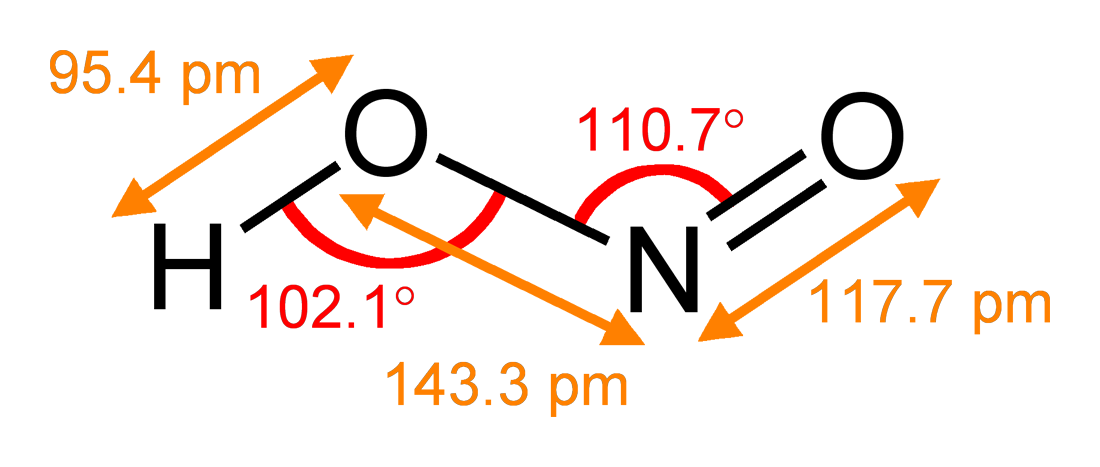
Dimensions of trans-HONO (from the microwave spectrum)

The nitrite ion has a symmetrical structure (C_{2v}) symmetry), with both N–O bonds having equal length and a bond angle of about 115°. In valence bond theory, it is described as a resonance hybrid with equal contributions from two canonical forms that are mirror images of each other. In molecular orbital theory, there is a sigma bond between each oxygen atom and the nitrogen atom, and a delocalized pi bond made from the p orbitals on nitrogen and oxygen atoms, which is perpendicular to the plane of the molecule. The negative charge of the ion is equally distributed on the two oxygen atoms. Both nitrogen and oxygen atoms carry a lone pair of electrons. Therefore, the nitrite ion is a Lewis base.

In the gas phase, it exists predominantly as a trans-planar molecule.

== Reactions ==
=== Acid-base properties ===
Nitrite is the conjugate base of the weak acid nitrous acid:

HNO_{2} ⇌ H^{+} + NO_{2}^{–}; pK_{a} ≈ 3.16 at 25 °C (77 °F)

Nitrous acid is also highly unstable, tending to disproportionate:

3 HNO_{2}(aq) ⇌ H_{3}O^{+} + 2 NO + NO_{3}^{–}

This reaction is slow at 0 °C (32 °F). Addition of acid to a solution of a nitrite in the presence of a reducing agent, such as iron(II), is a way to make nitric oxide (NO) in the laboratory.

=== Oxidation and reduction ===
The formal oxidation state of the nitrogen atom in nitrite is +3. This means it can be either oxidized to oxidation states +4 and +5 or reduced to as low as −3. Standard reduction potentials for reactions directly involving nitrous acid are shown in the table below:

Half-reaction	E^{0} (V)
NO_{3}^{–} + 3 H^{+} + 2 e^{−} ⇌ HNO_{2} + H_{2}O	+0.94
2 HNO_{2} + 4 H^{+} + 4 e^{−} ⇌ H_{2}N_{2}O_{2} + 2 H_{2}O	+0.86
N_{2}O_{4} + 2 H^{+} + 2 e^{−} ⇌ 2 HNO_{2}	+1.065
2 HNO_{2} + 4 H^{+} + 4 e^{−} ⇌ N_{2}O + 3 H_{2}O	+1.29

The data can be extended to include products in lower oxidation states. For example:

H_{2}N_{2}O_{2} + 2 H^{+} + 2 e^{−} ⇌ N_{2} + 2 H_{2}O; E^{0} = +2.65 V

Oxidation reactions usually result in the formation of the nitrate ion, with nitrogen in oxidation state +5. For example, oxidation with permanganate ion can be used for quantitative analysis of nitrite (by titration):

5 NO_{2}^{–} + 2 MnO_{4}^{–} + 6 H^{+} → 2 Mn^{2+} + 3 H_{2}O + 5 NO_{3}^{–}

The products of reduction reactions with the nitrite ion vary depending on the reducing agent used and its strength. With sulfur dioxide, the products are NO and N_{2}O; with tin(II) (Sn^{2+}) the product is hyponitrous acid (H_{2}N_{2}O_{2}); reduction all the way to ammonia (NH_{3}) occurs with hydrogen sulfide. With the hydrazinium cation (N_{2}H_{5}^{+}) the product of nitrite reduction is hydrazoic acid (HN_{3}), an unstable and explosive compound:

N_{2}H_{5}^{+} + HNO_{2} → HN_{3} + H_{2}O + H_{3}O^{+}

which can also further react with nitrite:

HNO_{2} + HN_{3} → N_{2}O + N_{2} + H_{2}O

This reaction is unusual in that it involves compounds with nitrogen in four different oxidation states.

=== Analysis of nitrite ===
Nitrite is detected and analyzed by the Griess Reaction, involving the formation of a deep red-colored azo dye upon treatment of a NO_{2}^{–}-containing sample with sulfanilic acid and naphthyl-1-amine in the presence of acid.

=== Coordination complexes ===
Nitrite is an ambidentate ligand and can form a wide variety of coordination complexes by binding to metal ions in several ways. For example, the red nitrito pentaamminecobalt complex [Co(NH_{3})_{5}(ONO)]^{2+} is metastable, isomerizing to the yellow nitro complex [Co(NH_{3})_{5}(NO_{2})]^{2+}.

Nitrite is processed by several enzymes, all of which utilize coordination complexes.

=== Hazardous reactions ===
When heated with cyanides or thiosulfates, nitrites violently explode.

== Biochemistry ==
A schematic representation of the microbial nitrogen cycle. ANAMMOX is anaerobic ammonium oxidation, DNRA is dissimilatory nitrate reduction to ammonium, and COMMAMOX is complete ammonium oxidation.

In nitrification, ammonium is converted to nitrite. Important species include Nitrosomonas. Other bacterial species, such as Nitrobacter, are responsible for oxidizing nitrite to nitrate.

Nitrite can be reduced to nitric oxide or ammonia by many species of bacteria. Under hypoxic conditions, nitrite may release nitric oxide, which causes potent vasodilation. Several mechanisms for nitrite conversion to NO have been described, including enzymatic reduction by xanthine oxidoreductase, nitrite reductase, and NO synthase (NOS), as well as nonenzymatic acidic disproportionation reactions.

== Uses ==
=== Chemical precursor ===
Azo dyes and other colorants are prepared by the process called diazotization, which requires nitrite.

=== Meat processing and cancer risk ===
The addition of nitrites and nitrates to processed meats, such as ham, bacon, and sausages, enhances the curing of meat, improves texture, imparts an attractive colour, inhibits growth of microbes and toxins, and extends shelf-life. Nitrite reacts with meat myoglobin by attaching to the heme iron atom during cooking, forming reddish-brown nitrosomyoglobin and the characteristic pink "fresh" color of N-nitroso compounds, which can damage colon cells, potentially leading to bowel cancer. Smoking, curing, salting, fermenting or adding preservatives to meats can initiate the formation of cancer-causing substances.

Cured-meat products may be manufactured without nitrate or nitrite, such as Parma ham, which was reported in 2018 as a safe product without toxin contamination. Other manufacturing processes do not assure reduction of nitrite results in toxin production.

=== Antidote for cyanide poisoning ===
Nitrites in the form of sodium nitrite and amyl nitrite are components of many cyanide antidote kits. Both of these compounds bind to hemoglobin and oxidize the Fe^{2+} ions to Fe^{3+} ions forming methemoglobin. Methemoglobin, in turn, binds to cyanide (CN), creating cyanmethemoglobin, effectively removing cyanide from the complex IV of the electron transport chain (ETC) in mitochondria, which is the primary site of disruption caused by cyanide. Another mechanism by which nitrites help treat cyanide toxicity is the generation of nitric oxide, which displaces the CN from the cytochrome c oxidase (ETC complex IV), making it available for methemoglobin to bind.

== Organic nitrites ==
A nitrite ester

In organic chemistry, alkyl nitrites are esters of nitrous acid and contain the nitrosoxy functional group. Nitro compounds contain the C−NO_{2} group. Nitrites have the general formula RONO, where R is an aryl or alkyl group. Amyl nitrite and other alkyl nitrites have a vasodilating action and must be handled in the laboratory with caution. They are sometimes used in medicine to treat heart disease. A classic named reaction for the synthesis of alkyl nitrites is the Meyer synthesis in which alkyl halides react with metallic nitrites to a mixture of nitroalkanes and nitrites.

== Safety ==
Large doses of nitrites cause acute poisoning in the form of methemoglobinemia, which can lead to death.

== See also ==
- Curing (food preservation)
- Alkyl nitrites
