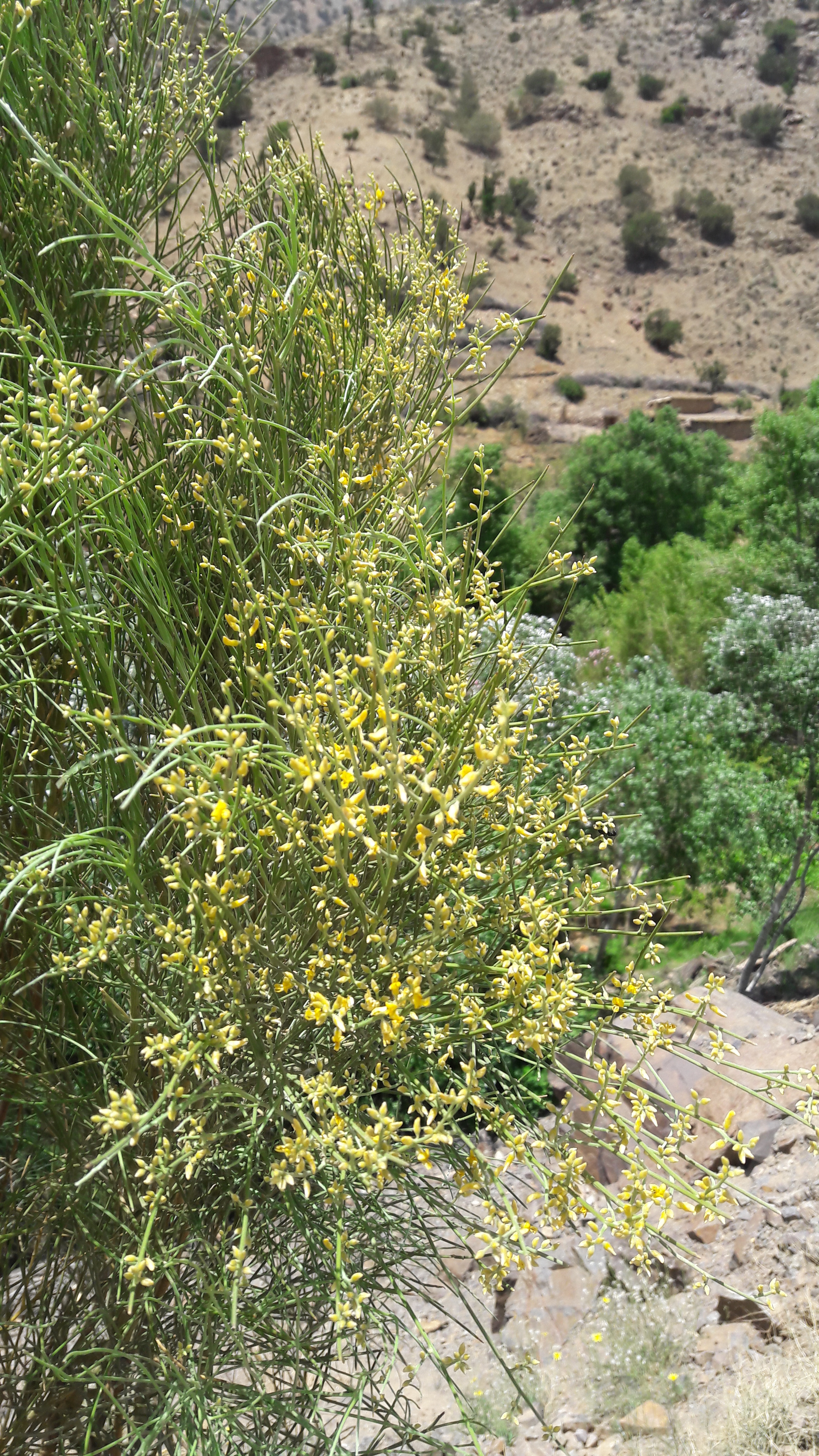

Scientific classification
- Kingdom: Plantae
- Clade: Tracheophytes
- Clade: Angiosperms
- Clade: Eudicots
- Clade: Rosids
- Order: Fabales
- Family: Fabaceae
- Subfamily: Faboideae
- Genus: Retama
- Species: R. dasycarpa

Binomial name
- Retama dasycarpa (L.) Boiss.

Synonyms
- Lygos dasycarpa (Coss.) Jäger; Genista dasycarpa Ball

= Retama dasycarpa =

Species of flowering plant

Retama dasycarpa is a flowering bush species in the genus Retama, endemic to Morocco. It is locally known as "R'tem" or "Algu".

== Taxonomy ==
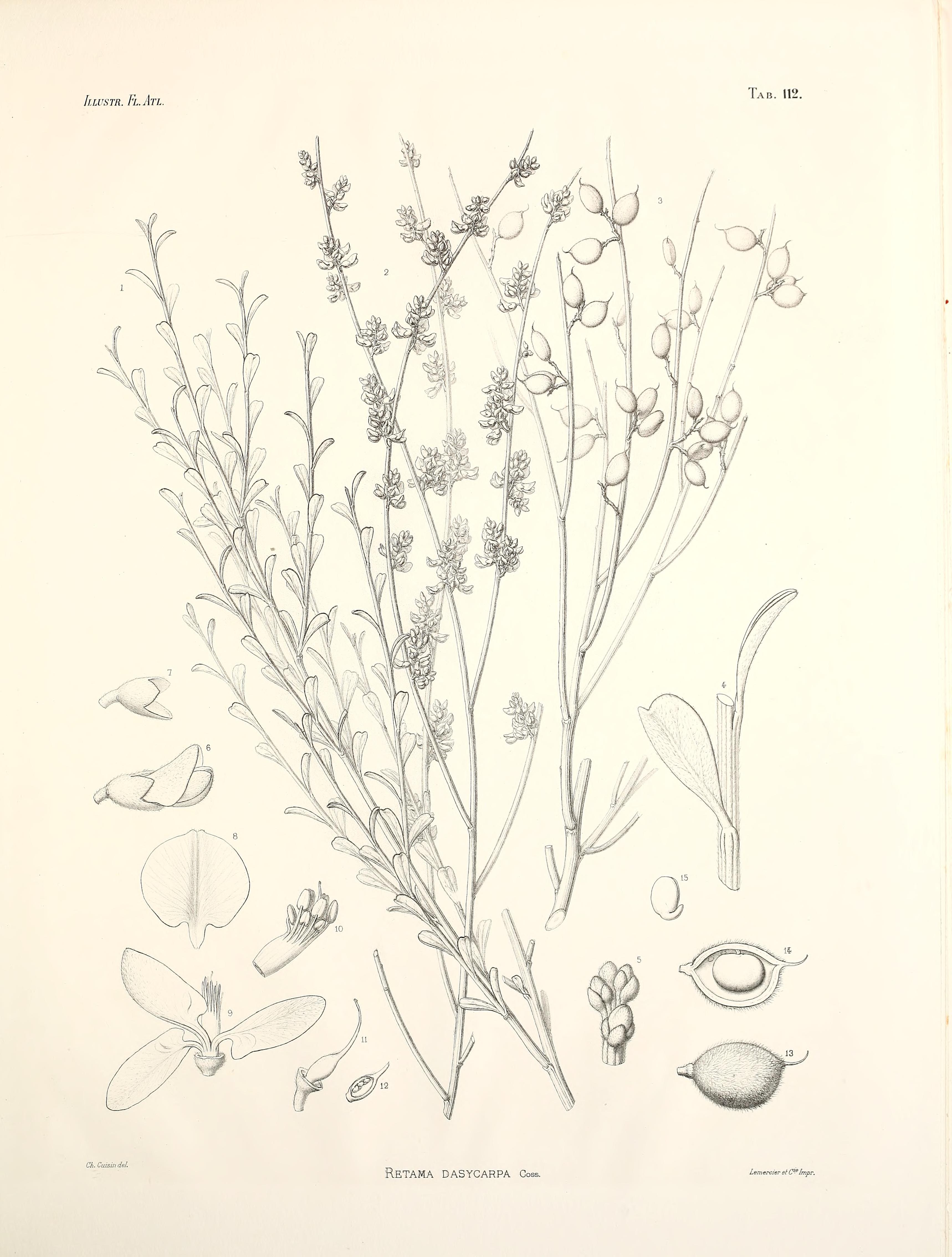
Illustration showing details of plant.

This species was first described in 1878 by John Ball as Genista dasycarpa and was later renamed as Retama dasycarpa in an 1892 publication by Ernest Cosson.

== Ethnopharmacology ==
Seeds of R. dasycarpa are traditionally used against urological and nephrological diseases (via oral ingestion) by Tashelhit speaking communities in the High Atlas.

== Symbiosis ==
Like most other legumes, R. dasycarpa forms nitrogen-fixing symbiosis with soil Bacteria known as rhizobia, specifically with members of the genus Bradyrhizobium. Plants studied in the High Atlas contained strains most closely related to B. lupini, B. frederickii, B. valentinum, and B. retamae. Plants studied in the Al-Maamora Forest contained strains most closely related to B. lupini, B. cytisi, and B. canariense plus one putative new species. Certain strains of Bradyrhizobium were shown to enhance the resilience to drought in R. dasycarpa.
