= Afipia =

Scientific classification
- Domain: Bacteria
- Kingdom: Pseudomonadati
- Phylum: Pseudomonadota
- Class: Alphaproteobacteria
- Order: Hyphomicrobiales
- Family: Nitrobacteraceae
- Genus: Afipia; Brenner et al. 1992

Type species
- Afipia felis Brenner et al. 1992

Species
- "Candidatus Afipia apatlaconensis" corrig. Sánchez-Reyes et al. 2020; Afipia birgiae La Scola et al. 2002; Afipia broomeae Brenner et al. 1992; Afipia carboxidovorans (Meyer et al. 1994) Hördt et al. 2020; Afipia carboxydohydrogena (Meyer et al. 1980 ex Sanjieva and Zavarzin 1971) Fatahi-Bafghi 2025; "Afipia cberi" Lo et al. 2013; Afipia clevelandensis Brenner et al. 1992; Afipia dichlorophenoxyacetatis Sawada et al. 2025; Afipia felis Brenner et al. 1992; Afipia massiliensis La Scola et al. 2002; "Afipia septicemium" Lo et al. 2013

Synonyms
- Oligotropha Meyer et al. 1994

Genus of bacteria

Afipia is a genus of bacteria in the family Nitrobacteraceae.

== Phylogeny ==
The currently accepted taxonomy is based on the List of Prokaryotic names with Standing in Nomenclature (LPSN). The phylogeny is based on whole-genome analysis.

- - Afipia
    - - Afipia felis
      - Afipia carboxidovorans
    - - Afipia birgiae
      - - Afipia clevelandensis
        - Afipia broomeae
  - outgroups
    - Nitrobacter
    - - Rhodopseudomonas
      - Bradyrhizobium
