= R. elegans =

R. elegans may refer to:

- Rallus elegans, the king rail, a waterbird species found in North America
- Ramodatodes elegans, a beetle species
- Raphitoma elegans, a sea snail species
- Rasbora elegans, the twospot rasbora, a ray-finned fish species
- Restrepia elegans, an orchid species
- Rhabdoderma elegans, an extinct genus of coelacanth fish that lived in the Carboniferous
- Rivetina elegans, a praying mantis species
- Rhodoplanes elegans, a bacterial species
- Rhopalomyces elegans, a common species of zygomycete fungus
- Rondeletia elegans, a flowering plant species
