= Bradyrhizobium erythrophlei =

Scientific classification
- Domain: Bacteria
- Kingdom: Pseudomonadati
- Phylum: Pseudomonadota
- Class: Alphaproteobacteria
- Order: Hyphomicrobiales
- Family: Nitrobacteraceae
- Genus: Bradyrhizobium
- Species: B. erythrophlei

Binomial name
- Bradyrhizobium erythrophlei Yao et al. 2015

Type strain
- CCBAU 53266, CCBAU 53267, CCBAU 53325, CGMCC 1.1300, HAMBI 3614, LMG 28425

Species of bacterium

Bradyrhizobium erythrophlei is a bacterium from the genus of Bradyrhizobium which has been isolated from the nodules of the tree Erythrophleum fordii.
