= Bradyrhizobium elkanii =

Scientific classification
- Domain: Bacteria
- Kingdom: Pseudomonadati
- Phylum: Pseudomonadota
- Class: Alphaproteobacteria
- Order: Hyphomicrobiales
- Family: Nitrobacteraceae
- Genus: Bradyrhizobium
- Species: B. elkanii

Binomial name
- Bradyrhizobium elkanii Kuykendall et al., 1993

Species of bacterium

Bradyrhizobium elkanii is a species of legume-root nodulating, microsymbiotic nitrogen-fixing bacterium originally identified as DNA homology group II strains of B. japonicum . In 1988, it was discovered that only DNA homology group II strains caused a destructive bleaching of leaves, termed scientifically "microsymbiont-induced foliar chlorosis", which was widespread in soybean production fields of the southern United States . Whole cell fatty acid content together with antibiotic resistance profiles were major phenotypic differences that helped establish DNA homology group II strains as a new species, Bradyrhizobium elkanii .
