= Bradyrhizobium ferriligni =

Scientific classification
- Domain: Bacteria
- Kingdom: Pseudomonadati
- Phylum: Pseudomonadota
- Class: Alphaproteobacteria
- Order: Hyphomicrobiales
- Family: Nitrobacteraceae
- Genus: Bradyrhizobium
- Species: B. ferriligni

Binomial name
- Bradyrhizobium ferriligni Yao et al. 2015

Type strain
- CCBAU 51502, CCBAU 51502, CGMCC 1.13001, HAMBI 3613

Species of bacterium

Bradyrhizobium ferriligni is a bacterium from the genus of Bradyrhizobium which has been isolated from the nodules of the tree Erythrophleum fordii.
