= Restrepia royi =

Scientific classification
- Kingdom: Plantae
- Clade: Embryophytes
- Clade: Tracheophytes
- Clade: Spermatophytes
- Clade: Angiosperms
- Clade: Monocots
- Order: Asparagales
- Family: Orchidaceae
- Subfamily: Epidendroideae
- Genus: Restrepia
- Species: R. royi

Binomial name
- Restrepia royi K.W.Holcomb & Driessen

Species of flowering plant

Restrepia royi is a species of flowering plant in the family Orchidaceae. It is an epiphyte with a yellow and red lip, a white dorsal sepal, and white petals. The species is native to Peru, and has been recognised by the American Orchid Society.

Restrepia royi was named after Roy Driessen in 2023.

== Taxonomy ==
Restrepia royi was described by Kevin W. Holcomb and Wiel Driessen in 2023. Prior to its formal description, the species was reportedly present in the horticultural trade under the name Restrepia elegans.

== Distribution ==
Restrepia royi is native to the wet tropical biome of Peru.

== Description ==
Restrepia royi is a small epiphyte with slender roots. The stem is up to 6 centimetres (2.4 in) long, and covered with five loose sheaths. The leaves are ovate, leathery, around 6 centimetres (2.4 in) long, and around 4 centimetres (1.6 in) wide.

The inflorescence is a single flower around 3.45 centimetres (1.36 in) long. The flower stem is thin, and around 4.3 centimetres (1.7 in) long. The lip is oblong in shape, around 8 millimetres (0.31 in) long, and around 2.5 millimetres (0.098 in) wide. The lip is yellow, mottled with red. The hypochile is convex, and the disc has a pair of low keels. The epichile has papillose edges, and has been compared to a chaise longue.

The dorsal sepal is around 19 millimetres (0.75 in) long, and around 2.5 millimetres (0.098 in) wide. It is membranous, translucent, and white, with three red veins. The synsepal is lightly concave, around 15.5 millimetres (0.61 in) long, and around 2.5 millimetres (0.098 in) wide. The lamina of the synsepal is elliptical, and orange with red markings.

The petals are narrowly linear-ovate, around 13 millimetres (0.51 in) long, and around 1.5 millimetres (0.059 in) wide. The petals are membranous, translucent, white, and have red margins and veins. The column is white, slender, around 4 millimetres (0.16 in) long, and around 1 millimetre (0.039 in) wide.

Restrepia royi is similar to Restrepia vasquezii, though the former has shorter stems and flowers, and a differently coloured synsepal.

== Etymology ==
Restrepia royi is named after Roy Driessen. Roy Driessen was the son of Wiel Driessen, one of the authors who described the species, and Renie Beurskens.

== Horticulture ==
In 2024, Restrepia royi was awarded a Certificate of Botanical Recognition by the American Orchid Society.
