= Tardiphaga robiniae =

Scientific classification
- Domain: Bacteria
- Kingdom: Pseudomonadati
- Phylum: Pseudomonadota
- Class: Alphaproteobacteria
- Order: Hyphomicrobiales
- Family: Nitrobacteraceae
- Genus: Tardiphaga
- Species: T. robiniae

Binomial name
- Tardiphaga robiniae Cai et al. 2011

Species of bacterium

Tardiphaga robiniae is a Gram-negative and rod-shaped bacteria from the genus of Tardiphaga which has been isolated from Robinia pseudoacacia root nodules.
