= Rhodoplanes pokkaliisoli =

Scientific classification
- Domain: Bacteria
- Kingdom: Pseudomonadati
- Phylum: Pseudomonadota
- Class: Alphaproteobacteria
- Order: Hyphomicrobiales
- Family: Nitrobacteraceae
- Genus: Rhodoplanes
- Species: R. pokkaliisoli

Binomial name
- Rhodoplanes pokkaliisoli Lakshmi et al. 2009

Type strain
- KCTC 5711, NBRC 104972, JA415T

Species of bacterium

Rhodoplanes pokkaliisoli is a Gram-negative, rod-shaped, non-sulfur bacterium from the genus Rhodoplanes which has been isolated from mud of a rice field on the Vypeen Island in India.
