= Rhodoplanes roseus =

Scientific classification
- Domain: Bacteria
- Kingdom: Pseudomonadati
- Phylum: Pseudomonadota
- Class: Alphaproteobacteria
- Order: Hyphomicrobiales
- Family: Nitrobacteraceae
- Genus: Rhodoplanes
- Species: R. roseus

Binomial name
- Rhodoplanes roseus (Janssen and Harfoot 1991) Hiraishi and Ueda 1994

Type strain
- ATCC 49724, DSM 5909, Janssen and Harfoot 941, NCIMB 13363

Synonyms
- Rhodopseudomonas rosea

Species of bacterium

Rhodoplanes roseus is a phototrophic bacterium from the genus Rhodoplanes which has been isolated from a duck pond in Cambridge in New Zealand.
