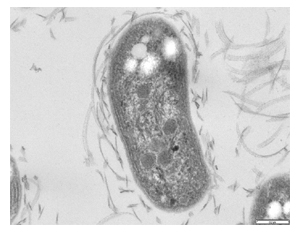
- TEM image of Nitrobacter winogradskyi strain Nb-255

Scientific classification
- Domain: Bacteria
- Kingdom: Pseudomonadati
- Phylum: Pseudomonadota
- Class: Alphaproteobacteria
- Order: Hyphomicrobiales
- Family: Nitrobacteraceae
- Genus: Nitrobacter
- Species: N. winogradskyi

Binomial name
- Nitrobacter winogradskyi Winslow et al. 1917

Synonyms
- Bacillus nirobakter, Bacterium nitrobacter, Nitrobacter winogradskii

= Nitrobacter winogradskyi =

Species of bacterium

Nitrobacter winogradskyi is a gram-negative nitrite-oxidizing bacteria from the genus of Nitrobacter. It is a chemolithoautotroph that derives energy by oxidation of nitrite. Nitrobacter winogradskyi is rod-shaped and is involved in the biological nitrification process that occurs within the nitrogen cycle.
