= Afipia birgiae =

Scientific classification
- Domain: Bacteria
- Kingdom: Pseudomonadati
- Phylum: Pseudomonadota
- Class: Alphaproteobacteria
- Order: Hyphomicrobiales
- Family: Nitrobacteraceae
- Genus: Afipia
- Species: A. birgiae

Binomial name
- Afipia birgiae La Scola et al. 2002

Species of bacterium

Afipia birgiae is a species in the Afipia bacterial genus. It is a gram-negative, oxidase-positive rod in the alpha-2 subgroup of the class Proteobacteria. It is motile by means of a single flagellum. Its type strain is 34632^{T} (=CIP 106344^{T} =CCUG 43108^{T}).

Afipia birgiae is a fastidious bacteria isolated from a hospital water supply in co-culture with amoebae. It is hypothesized that this group of bacteria are a potential cause of nosocomial infections.
