= Nitrobacter hamburgensis =

Scientific classification
- Domain: Bacteria
- Kingdom: Pseudomonadati
- Phylum: Pseudomonadota
- Class: Alphaproteobacteria
- Order: Hyphomicrobiales
- Family: Nitrobacteraceae
- Genus: Nitrobacter
- Species: N. hamburgensis

Binomial name
- Nitrobacter hamburgensis Bock et al. 2001

Species of bacterium

Nitrobacter hamburgensis is a gram-negative bacterium from the genus of Nitrobacter.
