= Photorhizobium thompsonianum =

Scientific classification
- Domain: Bacteria
- Phylum: Pseudomonadota
- Class: Alphaproteobacteria
- Order: Hyphomicrobiales
- Family: Nitrobacteraceae
- Genus: Photorhizobium
- Species: P. thompsonianum

Binomial name
- Photorhizobium thompsonianum Eaglesham et al. 1990

Species of bacterium

Photorhizobium thompsonianum is a bacterium from the genus Photorhizobium.
