= Bradyrhizobium paxllaeri =

Scientific classification
- Domain: Bacteria
- Kingdom: Pseudomonadati
- Phylum: Pseudomonadota
- Class: Alphaproteobacteria
- Order: Hyphomicrobiales
- Family: Nitrobacteraceae
- Genus: Bradyrhizobium
- Species: B. paxllaeri

Binomial name
- Bradyrhizobium paxllaeri Durán et al. 2014

Type strain
- CCBAU 23086, HAMBI 3052, LMG 25572

Species of bacterium

Bradyrhizobium paxllaeri is a bacterium from the genus of Bradyrhizobium.
