= Nitrobacter alkalicus =

Scientific classification
- Domain: Bacteria
- Kingdom: Pseudomonadati
- Phylum: Pseudomonadota
- Class: Alphaproteobacteria
- Order: Hyphomicrobiales
- Family: Nitrobacteraceae
- Genus: Nitrobacter
- Species: N. alkalicus

Binomial name
- Nitrobacter alkalicus Sorokin et al. 1999

Type strain
- AN1, LMD 97.163

Species of bacterium

Nitrobacter alkalicus is a nitrite-oxidizing bacteria from the genus of Nitrobacter.
