= Bradyrhizobium huanghuaihaiense =

Scientific classification
- Domain: Bacteria
- Kingdom: Pseudomonadati
- Phylum: Pseudomonadota
- Class: Alphaproteobacteria
- Order: Hyphomicrobiales
- Family: Nitrobacteraceae
- Genus: Bradyrhizobium
- Species: B. huanghuaihaiense

Binomial name
- Bradyrhizobium huanghuaihaiense Zhang et al. 2012

Type strain
- CCBAU 23303, CGMCC 1.10948, HAMBI 3180, LMG 26136, strain A4228

Species of bacterium

Bradyrhizobium huanghuaihaiense is a bacterium from the genus of Bradyrhizobium.
