= Bradyrhizobium lablabi =

Scientific classification
- Domain: Bacteria
- Kingdom: Pseudomonadati
- Phylum: Pseudomonadota
- Class: Alphaproteobacteria
- Order: Hyphomicrobiales
- Family: Nitrobacteraceae
- Genus: Bradyrhizobium
- Species: B. lablabi

Binomial name
- Bradyrhizobium lablabi Chang et al. 2011

Type strain
- CCBAU 23086, HAMBI 3052, LMG 25572

Species of bacterium

Bradyrhizobium lablabi is a Gram-negative, aerobic, non-spore-forming bacteria from the genus of Bradyrhizobium. which was isolated from Lablab purpureus in the Anhui province in China.
