= Rhodopseudomonas parapalustris =

Scientific classification
- Domain: Bacteria
- Kingdom: Pseudomonadati
- Phylum: Pseudomonadota
- Class: Alphaproteobacteria
- Order: Hyphomicrobiales
- Family: Nitrobacteraceae
- Genus: Rhodopseudomonas
- Species: R. parapalustris

Binomial name
- Rhodopseudomonas parapalustris Venkata Ramana et al. 2012

Type strain
- KCTC 5839, NBRC 106083, JA310

Synonyms
- Rhodopseudomonas pangongensis

Species of bacterium

Rhodopseudomonas parapalustris is a species of gram-negative, rod-shaped, budding phototrophic and motile bacterium from the genus of Rhodopseudomonas which has been isolated from soil and freshwater sediments in India.
