= Rhodopseudomonas faecalis =

Scientific classification
- Domain: Bacteria
- Kingdom: Pseudomonadati
- Phylum: Pseudomonadota
- Class: Alphaproteobacteria
- Order: Hyphomicrobiales
- Family: Nitrobacteraceae
- Genus: Rhodopseudomonas
- Species: R. faecalis

Binomial name
- Rhodopseudomonas faecalis Zhang et al. 2002

Species of bacterium

Rhodopseudomonas faecalis is a gram-negative, anaerobic, phototroph bacteria from the genus of Rhodopseudomonas with a polar flagella which was isolated from chicken faeces.
