= Bradyrhizobium embrapense =

Scientific classification
- Domain: Bacteria
- Kingdom: Pseudomonadati
- Phylum: Pseudomonadota
- Class: Alphaproteobacteria
- Order: Hyphomicrobiales
- Family: Nitrobacteraceae
- Genus: Bradyrhizobium
- Species: B. embrapense

Binomial name
- Bradyrhizobium embrapense Delamuta et al. 2015

Type strain
- BR 2212, SEMIA 6208, CIAT 2372, LMG 2987, SEMIA 6208, U674, CNPSo 2833

Species of bacterium

Bradyrhizobium embrapense is a nitrogen-fixing bacterium from the genus of Bradyrhizobium.
