= Nitrobacter vulgaris =

Scientific classification
- Domain: Bacteria
- Kingdom: Pseudomonadati
- Phylum: Pseudomonadota
- Class: Alphaproteobacteria
- Order: Hyphomicrobiales
- Family: Nitrobacteraceae
- Genus: Nitrobacter
- Species: N. vulgaris

Binomial name
- Nitrobacter vulgaris Bock et al. 2001

Species of bacterium

Nitrobacter vulgaris is a rod-shaped, Gram-negative, and a chemoautotrophic bacterium. It plays an important role in the nitrogen cycle by oxidizing nitrite into nitrate in soil. It cannot tolerate highly alkaline (NH_{4}+) conditions.

NO_{2}- + 1/2O_{2} -> NO_{3}-

== Genomics ==
- Nitrobacter Genome Projects (from Genomes OnLine Database)
- Comparative Analysis of Nitrobacter Genomes (at DOE's IMG system)
