= Bradyrhizobium subterraneum =

Scientific classification
- Domain: Bacteria
- Kingdom: Pseudomonadati
- Phylum: Pseudomonadota
- Class: Alphaproteobacteria
- Order: Hyphomicrobiales
- Family: Nitrobacteraceae
- Genus: Bradyrhizobium
- Species: B. subterraneum

Binomial name
- Bradyrhizobium subterraneum Gronemeyer et al. 2015

Type strain
- 54-1-1, 54-2-1, 57-2-1

Species of bacterium

Bradyrhizobium subterraneum is a nitrogen-fixing bacterium from the genus of Bradyrhizobium which has been isolated from the effective nodules of the peanut Arachis hypogaea.
