= Bradyrhizobium arachidis =

Scientific classification
- Domain: Bacteria
- Kingdom: Pseudomonadati
- Phylum: Pseudomonadota
- Class: Alphaproteobacteria
- Order: Hyphomicrobiales
- Family: Nitrobacteraceae
- Genus: Bradyrhizobium
- Species: B. arachidis

Binomial name
- Bradyrhizobium arachidis Wang et al. 2013

Species of bacterium

Bradyrhizobium arachidis is a species of legume-root nodulating, microsymbiotic nitrogen-fixing bacterium. It was first isolated from Arachis hypogaea root nodules in China. Its type strain is CCBAU 051107T (=CGMCC 1.12100T = HAMBI 3281T = LMG 26795T).
