= Afipia carboxidovorans =

Scientific classification
- Domain: Bacteria
- Kingdom: Pseudomonadati
- Phylum: Pseudomonadota
- Class: Alphaproteobacteria
- Order: Hyphomicrobiales
- Family: Nitrobacteraceae
- Genus: Afipia
- Species: A. carboxidovorans

Binomial name
- Afipia carboxidovorans (Meyer et al. 1994) Hördt et al. 2020

Synonyms
- Oligotropha carboxidovorans (ex Meyer and Schlegel 1978) Meyer et al. 1994; Pseudomonas carboxydovorans Meyer and Schlegel 1978

Species of bacterium

Afipia carboxidovorans is a Gram-negative soil bacterium. It is aerobic, the cells are rod-shaped.
