= Bradyrhizobium jicamae =

Scientific classification
- Domain: Bacteria
- Kingdom: Pseudomonadati
- Phylum: Pseudomonadota
- Class: Alphaproteobacteria
- Order: Hyphomicrobiales
- Family: Nitrobacteraceae
- Genus: Bradyrhizobium
- Species: B. jicamae

Binomial name
- Bradyrhizobium jicamae Ramírez-Bahena et al. 2009

Species of bacterium

Bradyrhizobium jicamae is a Gram-negative, strictly aerobic bacteria from the genus Bradyrhizobium.
