= Pseudolabrys taiwanensis =

Scientific classification
- Domain: Bacteria
- Kingdom: Pseudomonadati
- Phylum: Pseudomonadota
- Class: Alphaproteobacteria
- Order: Hyphomicrobiales
- Family: Nitrobacteraceae
- Genus: Pseudolabrys
- Species: P. taiwanensis

Binomial name
- Pseudolabrys taiwanensis Kämpfer et al. 2006

Type strain
- CCUG 51779, CIP 108932, CC-BB4

Species of bacterium

Pseudolabrys taiwanensis is a Gram-negative, rod-shaped bacterium from the family of Nitrobacteraceae which has been isolated from soil from Sinshe in Taichung County in Taiwan.
