= Bradyrhizobium ingae =

Scientific classification
- Domain: Bacteria
- Kingdom: Pseudomonadati
- Phylum: Pseudomonadota
- Class: Alphaproteobacteria
- Order: Hyphomicrobiales
- Family: Nitrobacteraceae
- Genus: Bradyrhizobium
- Species: B. ingae

Binomial name
- Bradyrhizobium ingae Da Silva et al. 2014

Type strain
- BR 10248, BR 10249, BR 10250, BR 10251, BR 10252, BR 10253, HAMBI 3600

Species of bacterium

Bradyrhizobium ingae is a bacterium from the genus of Bradyrhizobium which has been isolated from the nodules of the tree Inga laurina in Cerrado in Brazil.
