= Afipia broomeae =

Scientific classification
- Domain: Bacteria
- Kingdom: Pseudomonadati
- Phylum: Pseudomonadota
- Class: Alphaproteobacteria
- Order: Hyphomicrobiales
- Family: Nitrobacteraceae
- Genus: Afipia
- Species: A. broomeae

Binomial name
- Afipia broomeae Brenner al. 1991

Species of bacterium

Afipia broomeae is a species of the Afipia bacterial genus. It is a gram-negative, oxidase-positive, non-fermentative rod in the alpha-2 subgroup of the class Proteobacteria. It is motile by means of a single flagellum.
