= Bradyrhizobium betae =

Scientific classification
- Domain: Bacteria
- Kingdom: Pseudomonadati
- Phylum: Pseudomonadota
- Class: Alphaproteobacteria
- Order: Hyphomicrobiales
- Family: Nitrobacteraceae
- Genus: Bradyrhizobium
- Species: B. betae

Binomial name
- Bradyrhizobium betae Rivas et al. 2004

Species of bacterium

Bradyrhizobium betae is a species of legume-root nodulating, microsymbiotic nitrogen-fixing bacterium first isolated from the roots of Beta vulgaris, hence its name. It is slow-growing an endophytic. The type strain is PL7HG1^{T} (=LMG 21987^{T} =CEC^{T} 5829^{T}).
