= Bradyrhizobium neotropicale =

Scientific classification
- Domain: Bacteria
- Kingdom: Pseudomonadati
- Phylum: Pseudomonadota
- Class: Alphaproteobacteria
- Order: Hyphomicrobiales
- Family: Nitrobacteraceae
- Genus: Bradyrhizobium
- Species: B. neotropicale

Binomial name
- Bradyrhizobium neotropicale Zilli et al. 2014

Type strain
- BR 10247, BR10247, BR10296, BR10297

Species of bacterium

Bradyrhizobium neotropicale is a bacterium from the genus of Bradyrhizobium which has been isolated from the nodules of the tree Centrolobium paraense from the Amazon rainforest in Brazil.
