= Bradyrhizobium oligotrophicum =

Scientific classification
- Domain: Bacteria
- Kingdom: Pseudomonadati
- Phylum: Pseudomonadota
- Class: Alphaproteobacteria
- Order: Hyphomicrobiales
- Family: Nitrobacteraceae
- Genus: Bradyrhizobium
- Species: B. oligotrophicum

Binomial name
- Bradyrhizobium oligotrophicum Ramírez-Bahena et al. 2013

Type strain
- ATCC 43045, DSM 12412, Hattori strain S58, JCM 1494, LMG 10732, NCIMB 12151

Synonyms
- Agromonas oligotrophica

Species of bacterium

Bradyrhizobium oligotrophicum is a nitrogen-fixing bacteria from the genus of Bradyrhizobium which was isolated from rice paddy soil in Miyagi Prefecture in Japan.
