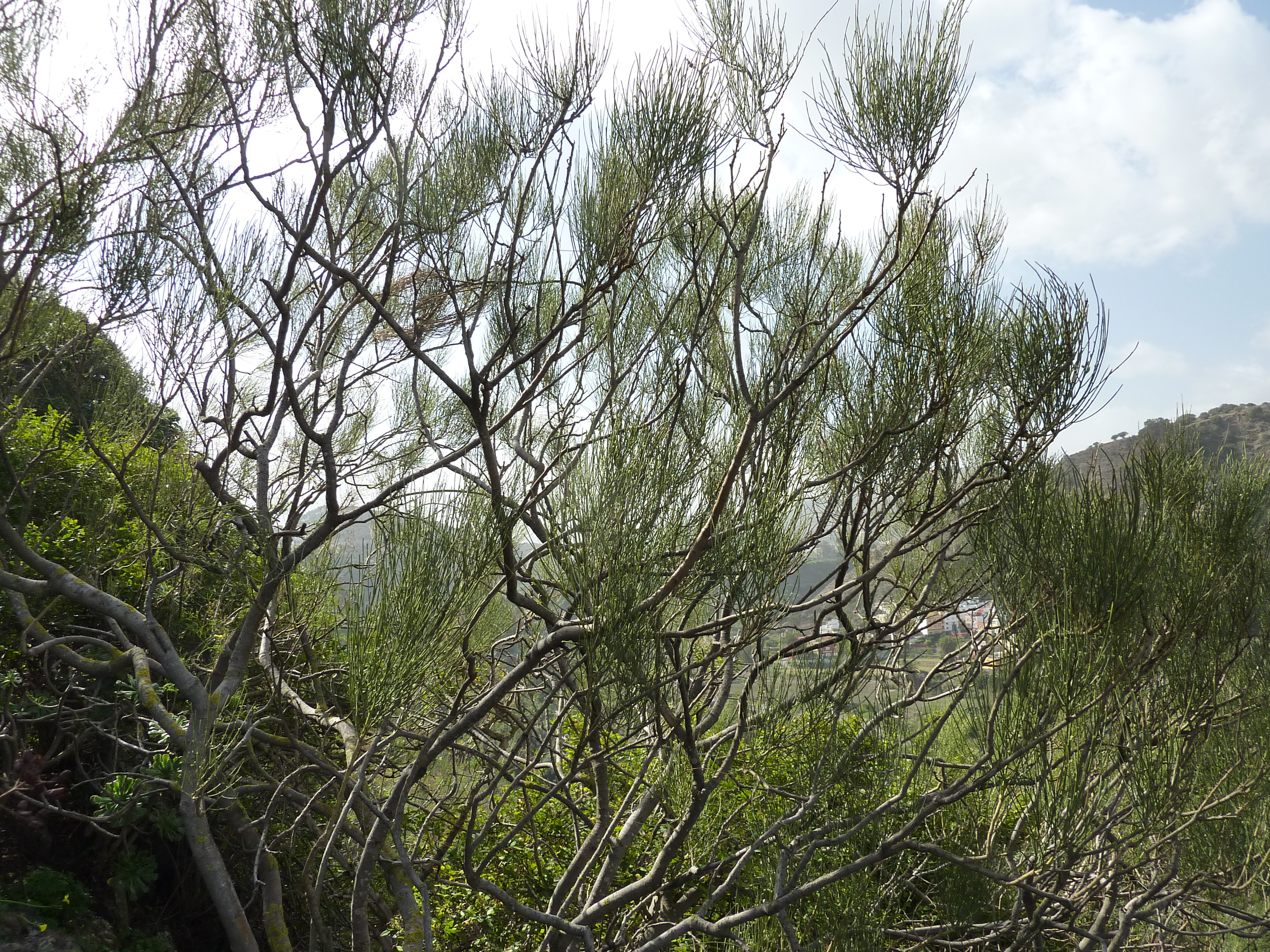

Scientific classification
- Kingdom: Plantae
- Clade: Tracheophytes
- Clade: Angiosperms
- Clade: Eudicots
- Clade: Rosids
- Order: Fabales
- Family: Fabaceae
- Subfamily: Faboideae
- Genus: Retama
- Species: R. rhodorhizoides

Binomial name
- Retama rhodorhizoides (Webb & Berthel.) Webb & Berthel.

Synonyms
- Genista rhodorhizoides Webb & Berthel.; Retama microcarpa Webb; Retama recutita Webb ex Bolle

= Retama rhodorhizoides =

Species of legume

Retama rhodorhizoides is a species or subspecies of flowering plant in the family Fabaceae, endemic to the Canary Islands.

== Taxonomy ==
Retama rhodorhizoides was first described by Philip Barker-Webb and Sabin Berthelot in a work dated to 1836–1850 that was initially published in parts. An illustration of the species, first published in 1837, was labelled Genista rhodorhizoides. When the authors published a Latin description in 1842, they transferred the species to Retama.

The species is included in Retama monosperma by some sources, and, according to the African Plants Database, has been incorrectly identified as Retama raetam by others. Retama rhodorhizoides is restricted to the Canary Islands.
