= Rhodopseudomonas harwoodiae =

Scientific classification
- Domain: Bacteria
- Kingdom: Pseudomonadati
- Phylum: Pseudomonadota
- Class: Alphaproteobacteria
- Order: Hyphomicrobiales
- Family: Nitrobacteraceae
- Genus: Rhodopseudomonas
- Species: R. harwoodiae

Binomial name
- Rhodopseudomonas harwoodiae Venkata Ramana et al. 2012

Species of bacterium

Rhodopseudomonas harwoodiae is a species of gram-negative bacterium from the genus of Rhodopseudomonas.
