= Bradyrhizobium liaoningense =

Scientific classification
- Domain: Bacteria
- Kingdom: Pseudomonadati
- Phylum: Pseudomonadota
- Class: Alphaproteobacteria
- Order: Hyphomicrobiales
- Family: Nitrobacteraceae
- Genus: Bradyrhizobium
- Species: B. liaoningense

Binomial name
- Bradyrhizobium liaoningense Xu et al. 1995

Species of bacterium

Bradyrhizobium liaoningense is a species of legume-root nodulating, microsymbiotic nitrogen-fixing bacterium. It was first isolated from Glycine soja and Glycine max root nodules in China. Its type strain is strain 2281.
