= Variibacter gotjawalensis =

Scientific classification
- Domain: Bacteria
- Kingdom: Pseudomonadati
- Phylum: Pseudomonadota
- Class: Alphaproteobacteria
- Order: Hyphomicrobiales
- Family: Nitrobacteraceae
- Genus: Variibacter
- Species: V. gotjawalensis

Binomial name
- Variibacter gotjawalensis Kim et al. 2014

Synonyms
- Gotjawalia aewolensis; Gotjawalibacter aewolensis

Species of bacterium

Variibacter gotjawalensis is a Gram-negative and non-motile bacteria from the genus Variibacter which has been isolated from soil from the Gotjawal forest on Korea.
