= Bradyrhizobium kavangense =

Scientific classification
- Domain: Bacteria
- Kingdom: Pseudomonadati
- Phylum: Pseudomonadota
- Class: Alphaproteobacteria
- Order: Hyphomicrobiales
- Family: Nitrobacteraceae
- Genus: Bradyrhizobium
- Species: B. kavangense

Binomial name
- Bradyrhizobium kavangense Lasse gronemeyer et al. 2015

Type strain
- 1BT 1-1

Synonyms
- Bradyrhizobium kavangi

Species of bacterium

Bradyrhizobium kavangense is a nitrogen-fixing bacterium from the genus Bradyrhizobium which has been isolated from the nodules of the cowpea Vigna unguiculata in the Kavango region in Namibia.
