= Rhodopseudomonas julia =

Scientific classification
- Domain: Bacteria
- Kingdom: Pseudomonadati
- Phylum: Pseudomonadota
- Class: Alphaproteobacteria
- Order: Hyphomicrobiales
- Family: Nitrobacteraceae
- Genus: Rhodopseudomonas
- Species: R. julia

Binomial name
- Rhodopseudomonas julia Kompantseva 1993

Type strain
- ATCC 51105, DSM 11549, KR-11-67

Species of bacterium

Rhodopseudomonas julia is a species of gram-negative bacterium from the genus of Rhodopseudomonas which was isolated from a sulfur spring from the Golovin Volcano on the Kunashir Island in Russia.
