= Bradyrhizobium rifense =

Scientific classification
- Domain: Bacteria
- Kingdom: Pseudomonadati
- Phylum: Pseudomonadota
- Class: Alphaproteobacteria
- Order: Hyphomicrobiales
- Family: Nitrobacteraceae
- Genus: Bradyrhizobium
- Species: B. rifense

Binomial name
- Bradyrhizobium rifense Chahboune et al. 2012

Species of bacterium

Bradyrhizobium rifense is a bacterium that was isolated from nodules of Cytisus villosus from the Moroccan Rif.
