= Blastobacter henricii =

Scientific classification
- Domain: Bacteria
- Kingdom: Pseudomonadati
- Phylum: Pseudomonadota
- Class: Alphaproteobacteria
- Order: Hyphomicrobiales
- Family: Nitrobacteraceae
- Genus: Blastobacter
- Species: B. henricii

Binomial name
- Blastobacter henricii Zavarzin 1961

Species of bacterium

Blastobacter henricii is a bacterium from the genus of Blastobacter.
