= Bradyrhizobium ganzhouense =

Scientific classification
- Domain: Bacteria
- Kingdom: Pseudomonadati
- Phylum: Pseudomonadota
- Class: Alphaproteobacteria
- Order: Hyphomicrobiales
- Family: Nitrobacteraceae
- Genus: Bradyrhizobium
- Species: B. ganzhouense

Binomial name
- Bradyrhizobium ganzhouense Lu et al. 2014

Species of bacterium

Bradyrhizobium ganzhouense is a bacterium from the genus of Bradyrhizobium which was isolated from Acacia melanoxylon.
