= Bradyrhizobium tropiciagri =

Scientific classification
- Domain: Bacteria
- Kingdom: Pseudomonadati
- Phylum: Pseudomonadota
- Class: Alphaproteobacteria
- Order: Hyphomicrobiales
- Family: Nitrobacteraceae
- Genus: Bradyrhizobium
- Species: B. tropiciagri

Binomial name
- Bradyrhizobium tropiciagri Delamuta et al. 2015

Type strain
- BR 1009, SEMIA 6148, LMG 28867, SMS 303, CNPSo 1112

Species of bacterium

Bradyrhizobium tropiciagri is a nitrogen-fixing bacterium from the genus of Bradyrhizobium.
