= Restrepia vasquezii =

Conservation status
- CITES Appendix II

Scientific classification
- Kingdom: Plantae
- Clade: Tracheophytes
- Clade: Angiosperms
- Clade: Monocots
- Order: Asparagales
- Family: Orchidaceae
- Subfamily: Epidendroideae
- Genus: Restrepia
- Species: R. vasquezii

Binomial name
- Restrepia vasquezii Luer

Species of flowering plant

Restrepia vasquezii is a species of flowering plant in the family Orchidaceae. It is an epiphyte with a yellow synsepal, and is native to Bolivia. The species was described in 1996, and is listed in Appendix II of CITES.

== Taxonomy ==
The species was described by Carlyle A. Luer in 1996.

== Distribution ==
Restrepia vasquezii is native to the wet tropical biome of La Paz, Bolivia.

== Description ==
Restrepia vasquezii is an epiphyte. The stem is up to 12 centimetres (4.7 in) long. The flowers are around 46 millimetres (1.8 in) long. The synsepal is yellow, and evenly covered with purple spots.

Restrepia vasquezii is similar to Restrepia royi, though the former is larger.

== Conservation ==
Restrepia vasquezii is listed in Appendix II of CITES. There are no quotas or suspensions in place for the species.
