= Bradyrhizobium yuanmingense =

Scientific classification
- Domain: Bacteria
- Kingdom: Pseudomonadati
- Phylum: Pseudomonadota
- Class: Alphaproteobacteria
- Order: Hyphomicrobiales
- Family: Nitrobacteraceae
- Genus: Bradyrhizobium
- Species: B. yuanmingense

Binomial name
- Bradyrhizobium yuanmingense Yao et al. 2002

Species of bacterium

Bradyrhizobium yuanmingense is a species of legume-root nodulating, endosymbiont nitrogen-fixing bacterium, associated with Lespedeza and Vigna species. Its type strain is CCBAU 10071(T) (= CFNEB 101(T)).
