= Bradyrhizobium manausense =

Scientific classification
- Domain: Bacteria
- Kingdom: Pseudomonadati
- Phylum: Pseudomonadota
- Class: Alphaproteobacteria
- Order: Hyphomicrobiales
- Family: Nitrobacteraceae
- Genus: Bradyrhizobium
- Species: B. manausense

Binomial name
- Bradyrhizobium manausense Silva et al. 2014

Type strain
- BR 3307, BR 3310, BR 3315, BR 3323

Species of bacterium

Bradyrhizobium manausense is a bacterium from the genus of Bradyrhizobium which has been isolated from the nodules from the plant Vigna unguiculata from the Amazon rainforest.
