= Rhodoplanes oryzae =

Scientific classification
- Domain: Bacteria
- Kingdom: Pseudomonadati
- Phylum: Pseudomonadota
- Class: Alphaproteobacteria
- Order: Hyphomicrobiales
- Family: Nitrobacteraceae
- Genus: Rhodoplanes
- Species: R. oryzae

Binomial name
- Rhodoplanes oryzae Srinivas et al. 2014

Type strain
- KCTC 15260, NBRC 109406, JA793

Species of bacterium

Rhodoplanes oryzae is a Gram-negative, rod-shaped, phototrophic bacterium from the genus Rhodoplanes.
