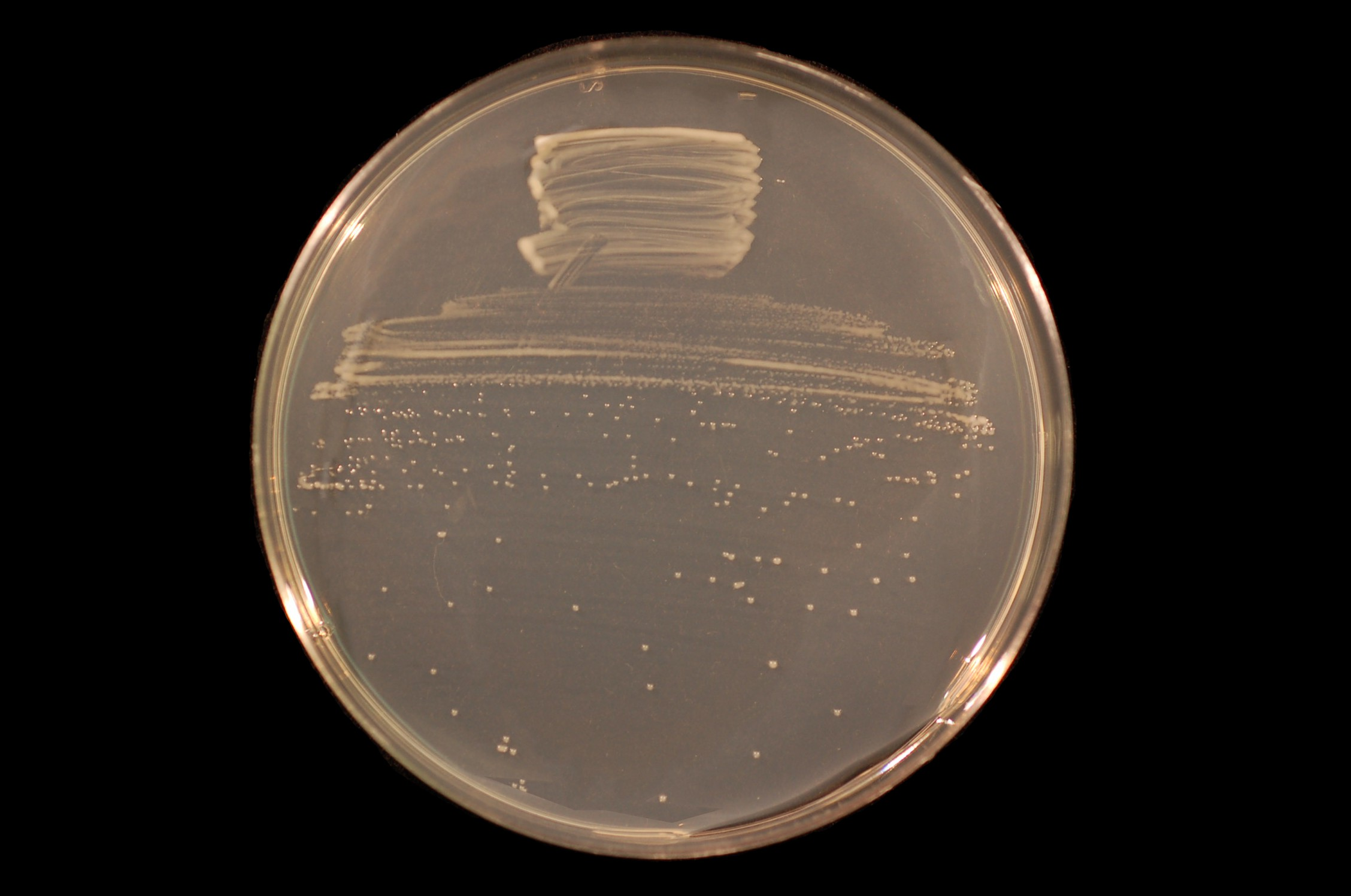
- Bradyrhizobium diazoefficiens strain USDA 110 on an agar plate

Scientific classification
- Domain: Bacteria
- Kingdom: Pseudomonadati
- Phylum: Pseudomonadota
- Class: Alphaproteobacteria
- Order: Hyphomicrobiales
- Family: Nitrobacteraceae
- Genus: Bradyrhizobium
- Species: B. diazoefficiens

Binomial name
- Bradyrhizobium diazoefficiens Delamuta et al. 2013

Type strain
- 3I1B110, ACCC 15034, BCRC 13528, CCRC 13528, CCT 4249, CNPSo 46, IAM 13628, IFO 14792, JCM 10833, NBRC 14792, NIFTAL 102, NRRL B-4361, NRRL B-4450, R-12974, SEMIA 5032, TAL 102, TISTR 339, USDA 110

= Bradyrhizobium diazoefficiens =

Species of bacterium

Bradyrhizobium diazoefficiens is a species of bacteria from the genus of Bradyrhizobium.
