= Bradyrhizobium stylosanthis =

Scientific classification
- Domain: Bacteria
- Kingdom: Pseudomonadati
- Phylum: Pseudomonadota
- Class: Alphaproteobacteria
- Order: Hyphomicrobiales
- Family: Nitrobacteraceae
- Genus: Bradyrhizobium
- Species: B. stylosanthis

Binomial name
- Bradyrhizobium stylosanthis Delamuta et al. 2016

Type strain
- BR 446, BR 510, BR 511, CNPSo 2823, HAMBI 3668

Species of bacterium

Bradyrhizobium stylosanthis is a nitrogen-fixing bacterium from the genus Bradyrhizobium which has been isolated from the nodules of the plant Stylosanthes guianensis.
