= Afipia massiliensis =

Scientific classification
- Domain: Bacteria
- Kingdom: Pseudomonadati
- Phylum: Pseudomonadota
- Class: Alphaproteobacteria
- Order: Hyphomicrobiales
- Family: Nitrobacteraceae
- Genus: Afipia
- Species: A. massiliensis

Binomial name
- Afipia massiliensis La Scola et al. 2002

Species of bacterium

Afipia massiliensis is a species of the Afipia bacterial genus. It is a gram-negative, oxidase-positive rod in the alpha-2 subgroup of the class Proteobacteria. It is motile by means of a single flagellum. Its type strain is 34633^{T} (=CIP 107022^{T} =CCUG 45153^{T}).
