= Bradyrhizobium iriomotense =

Scientific classification
- Domain: Bacteria
- Kingdom: Pseudomonadati
- Phylum: Pseudomonadota
- Class: Alphaproteobacteria
- Order: Hyphomicrobiales
- Family: Nitrobacteraceae
- Genus: Bradyrhizobium
- Species: B. iriomotense

Binomial name
- Bradyrhizobium iriomotense Islam et al. 2010

Species of bacterium

Bradyrhizobium iriomotense is a species of legume-root nodulating, endosymbiont nitrogen-fixing bacterium, first isolated from Entada koshunensis. The type strain is EK05^{T} (= NBRC 102520^{T} = LMG 24129^{T}).
