= Bradyrhizobium viridifuturi =

Scientific classification
- Domain: Bacteria
- Kingdom: Pseudomonadati
- Phylum: Pseudomonadota
- Class: Alphaproteobacteria
- Order: Hyphomicrobiales
- Family: Nitrobacteraceae
- Genus: Bradyrhizobium
- Species: B. viridifuturi

Binomial name
- Bradyrhizobium viridifuturi Helene et al. 2015

Type strain
- CMVU02, CMVU30, SEMIA 6387, SEMIA 6428

Species of bacterium

Bradyrhizobium viridifuturi is a nitrogen-fixing bacterium from the genus of Bradyrhizobium.
