= Rhodoplanes serenus =

Scientific classification
- Domain: Bacteria
- Kingdom: Pseudomonadati
- Phylum: Pseudomonadota
- Class: Alphaproteobacteria
- Order: Hyphomicrobiales
- Family: Nitrobacteraceae
- Genus: Rhodoplanes
- Species: R. serenus

Binomial name
- Rhodoplanes serenus Rhodoplanes serenus Okamura et al. 2009

Type strain
- DSM 18633, NBRC 102049, HA17, TUT3530

Synonyms
- Rhodoplanes mangalorensis; Rhodoplanes piscinae Chakravarthy et al. 2012

Species of bacterium

Rhodoplanes serenus is a Gram-negative, phototrophic, non-sulfur, motile bacterium from the genus Rhodoplanes which has been isolated from pond water from the Sanshiro-ike pond near the University of Tokyo in Japan.
