= Afipia carboxydohydrogena =

Scientific classification
- Domain: Bacteria
- Kingdom: Pseudomonadati
- Phylum: Pseudomonadota
- Class: Alphaproteobacteria
- Order: Hyphomicrobiales
- Family: Nitrobacteraceae
- Genus: Afipia
- Species: A. carboxydohydrogena

Binomial name
- Afipia carboxydohydrogena (Meyer et al. 1980 ex Sanjieva and Zavarzin 1971) Fatahi-Bafghi 2025

Synonyms
- Pseudomonas carboxydohydrogena (ex Sanjieva and Zavarzin 1971) Meyer et al. 1980; Seliberia carboxydohydrogena Sanjieva and Zavarzin 1971

Species of bacterium

Afipia carboxydohydrogena is a species of Gram-negative bacteria. Following 16S rRNA phylogenetic analysis, it was determined that A. carboxydohydrogena belonged in the Bradyrhizobium rRNA lineage.
