= Bradyrhizobium pachyrhizi =

Scientific classification
- Domain: Bacteria
- Kingdom: Pseudomonadati
- Phylum: Pseudomonadota
- Class: Alphaproteobacteria
- Order: Hyphomicrobiales
- Family: Nitrobacteraceae
- Genus: Bradyrhizobium
- Species: B. pachyrhizi

Binomial name
- Bradyrhizobium pachyrhizi Ramírez-Bahena et al. 2009

Type strain
- CECT 7396, DSM 19631, LMG 24246, PAC48, strain PAC48, Velazquez PAC48

Species of bacterium

Bradyrhizobium pachyrhizi is a bacterium from the genus of Bradyrhizobium which was isolated from nodules of Pachyrhizus erosus in Guanacaste in Costa Rica.
