= Bradyrhizobium daqingense =

Scientific classification
- Domain: Bacteria
- Kingdom: Pseudomonadati
- Phylum: Pseudomonadota
- Class: Alphaproteobacteria
- Order: Hyphomicrobiales
- Family: Nitrobacteraceae
- Genus: Bradyrhizobium
- Species: B. daqingense

Binomial name
- Bradyrhizobium daqingense Wang et al. 2013

Type strain
- CCBAU 15774, CGMCC 1.10947, HAMBI 3184, LMG 26137

Species of bacterium

Bradyrhizobium daqingense is a bacterium from the genus Bradyrhizobium.
