= Rhodoplanes azumiensis =

Scientific classification
- Domain: Bacteria
- Kingdom: Pseudomonadati
- Phylum: Pseudomonadota
- Class: Alphaproteobacteria
- Order: Hyphomicrobiales
- Family: Nitrobacteraceae
- Genus: Rhodoplanes
- Species: R. azumiensis

Binomial name
- Rhodoplanes azumiensis Hiraishi 2017

Species of bacterium

Rhodoplanes azumiensis is a thermotolerant bacterium isolated from sediment mud and cyanobacterial mats located in Nakanoyu hot springs, located in the Azumi district, Matsumoto, Nagano Prefecture, Japan. R. azumiensis is a photoheterotroph that is capable of using many organic materials as its carbon source. Colonies and liquid cultures exhibit a brownish red color when grown phototrophically, and are colorless when grown aerobically in darkness.

== Isolation ==
Samples were taken from sediment mud and cyanobacterial mats located in Nakanoyu hot springs in Japan. The samples were then introduced to 20 mL screw-capped test tubes containing 10-mL of Rhodoplanes (RPL) medium and were incubated at 42°C. Pink cultures occurred and were plated on RPL agar plates and incubated aerobically at 42°C. Isolation streaking was conducted multiple times until 2 novel species were isolated.

== DNA sequencing and confirmation of novelty ==
20 strains of Rhodoplanes were isolated in the method outlined above, of those, 18 had 100% similarity levels of 16S rRNA to previously outlined and published 16S rRNA Rhodoplanes species. The two novel species isolated demonstrated a 96.9-98.7% similarity to previously isolated Rhodoplanes species. DNA-DNA hybridization was then conducted to determine whether or not these two isolated species were novel. Rhodoplanes azumiensis hybridized between 48 and 52% with previously isolated Rhodoplanes species allowing the researchers to determine it was indeed a novel strain.

== Characteristics ==
Rhodoplanes azumiensis are gram-negative rods 1 μm wide and 2-4 μm long. They are capable of motility by a singular polar flagella. R. azumiensis uses budding to multiply, and form rosette-like clusters in older cultures. Colonies and liquid cultures are brownish red when grown phototrophically and colorless when grown aerobically in darkness. Their major carotenoid components are rhodopin, spirilloxanthin, anhydrorhodovibrin, rhodovibrin, and lycopene allowing them to utilize absorption maxima at 376, 498, 529, 594, 800, 859 and 892 nm. R. azumiensis 16S rRNA GC content is 70.4%. The optimal growth is 40° C, the optimum pH is between 6.8 and 7.2, and they are able to use pyruvate, citrate, malate, acetate, lactate, succinate, fumarate, and malonate as carbon sources.
