= Bradyrhizobium guangdongense =

Scientific classification
- Domain: Bacteria
- Kingdom: Pseudomonadati
- Phylum: Pseudomonadota
- Class: Alphaproteobacteria
- Order: Hyphomicrobiales
- Family: Nitrobacteraceae
- Genus: Bradyrhizobium
- Species: B. guangdongense

Binomial name
- Bradyrhizobium guangdongense Li et al. 2015

Type strain
- CCBAU 51649, CCBAU 51650, CCBAU 51658, CCBAU 51773, CGMCC 1.15034, LMG 28620

Species of bacterium

Bradyrhizobium guangdongense is a bacterium from the genus of Bradyrhizobium which has been isolated from the effective nodules of a peanut plant (Arachis hypogaea).
