= Bradyrhizobium ottawaense =

Scientific classification
- Domain: Bacteria
- Kingdom: Pseudomonadati
- Phylum: Pseudomonadota
- Class: Alphaproteobacteria
- Order: Hyphomicrobiales
- Family: Nitrobacteraceae
- Genus: Bradyrhizobium
- Species: B. ottawaense

Binomial name
- Bradyrhizobium ottawaense Yu et al. 2014

Type strain
- HAMBI 3284, LMG 26739, OO99

Species of bacterium

Bradyrhizobium ottawaense is a nitrogen fixing bacterium from the genus of Bradyrhizobium which has been isolated from the nodules of soybeans in Ottawa in Canada.
