= Ramodatodes nigripes =

Scientific classification
- Kingdom: Animalia
- Phylum: Arthropoda
- Clade: Pancrustacea
- Class: Insecta
- Order: Coleoptera
- Suborder: Polyphaga
- Infraorder: Cucujiformia
- Family: Cerambycidae
- Genus: Ramodatodes
- Species: R. nigripes

Binomial name
- Ramodatodes nigripes Villiers, 1982

Species of beetle

Ramodatodes nigripes is a species of beetle in the family Cerambycidae. It was described by Villiers in 1982.
