= Ramodatodes =

Scientific classification
- Kingdom: Animalia
- Phylum: Arthropoda
- Class: Insecta
- Order: Coleoptera
- Suborder: Polyphaga
- Infraorder: Cucujiformia
- Family: Cerambycidae
- Subfamily: Apatophyseinae
- Tribe: Apatophyseini
- Genus: Ramodatodes; Villiers, 1982

Genus of beetles

Ramodatodes is a genus in the longhorn beetle family Cerambycidae. There are about five described species in Ramodatodes, found in Madagascar.

== Species ==
These five species belong to the genus Ramodatodes:

- Ramodatodes armicollis (Fairmaire, 1902)
- Ramodatodes elegans Villiers, 1982
- Ramodatodes nigripes Villiers, 1982
- Ramodatodes rufovelutinum (Fairmaire, 1902)
- Ramodatodes sericeum Villiers, 1982
