= Phyllonorycter spartocytisi =

Scientific classification
- Domain: Eukaryota
- Kingdom: Animalia
- Phylum: Arthropoda
- Class: Insecta
- Order: Lepidoptera
- Family: Gracillariidae
- Genus: Phyllonorycter
- Species: P. spartocytisi

Binomial name
- Phyllonorycter spartocytisi (M. Hering, 1927)

Synonyms
- Lithocolletis spartocytisi M. Hering, 1927

Species of moth

Phyllonorycter spartocytisi is a moth of the family Gracillariidae. It is known from Spain and the Canary Islands.

The larvae feed on Retama monosperma, Retama recutita and Cytisus filipes. They mine the leaves of their host plant.
