= Bradyrhizobium denitrificans =

Scientific classification
- Domain: Bacteria
- Kingdom: Pseudomonadati
- Phylum: Pseudomonadota
- Class: Alphaproteobacteria
- Order: Hyphomicrobiales
- Family: Nitrobacteraceae
- Genus: Bradyrhizobium
- Species: B. denitrificans

Binomial name
- Bradyrhizobium denitrificans van Berkum et al. 2011

Type strain
- ATCC 43295, DSM 1113, HAMBI 2266, IAM 1005, IFAM 1005, LMG 26303, LMG 8443,, Müller 222, NCIMB 12292, USDA 4967, VKM B-2062]

Synonyms
- Blastobacter denitrificans Hirsch and Müller 1986

Species of bacterium

Bradyrhizobium denitrificans is a bacterium from the genus Bradyrhizobium which was isolated from surface lake water in Germany.
