= Bradyrhizobium retamae =

Scientific classification
- Domain: Bacteria
- Kingdom: Pseudomonadati
- Phylum: Pseudomonadota
- Class: Alphaproteobacteria
- Order: Hyphomicrobiales
- Family: Nitrobacteraceae
- Genus: Bradyrhizobium
- Species: B. retamae

Binomial name
- Bradyrhizobium retamae Guerrouj et al. 2014

Species of bacterium

Bradyrhizobium retamae is a bacterium from the genus of Bradyrhizobium.
