= Pseudorhodoplanes =

Scientific classification
- Domain: Bacteria
- Kingdom: Pseudomonadati
- Phylum: Pseudomonadota
- Class: Alphaproteobacteria
- Order: Hyphomicrobiales
- Family: Nitrobacteraceae
- Genus: Pseudorhodoplanes; Tirandaz et al. 2015
- Species: P. sinuspersici

Binomial name
- Pseudorhodoplanes sinuspersici Tirandaz et al. 2015

Genus of bacteria

Pseudorhodoplanes is a genus of bacteria. The only species is Pseudorhodoplanes sinuspersici.
