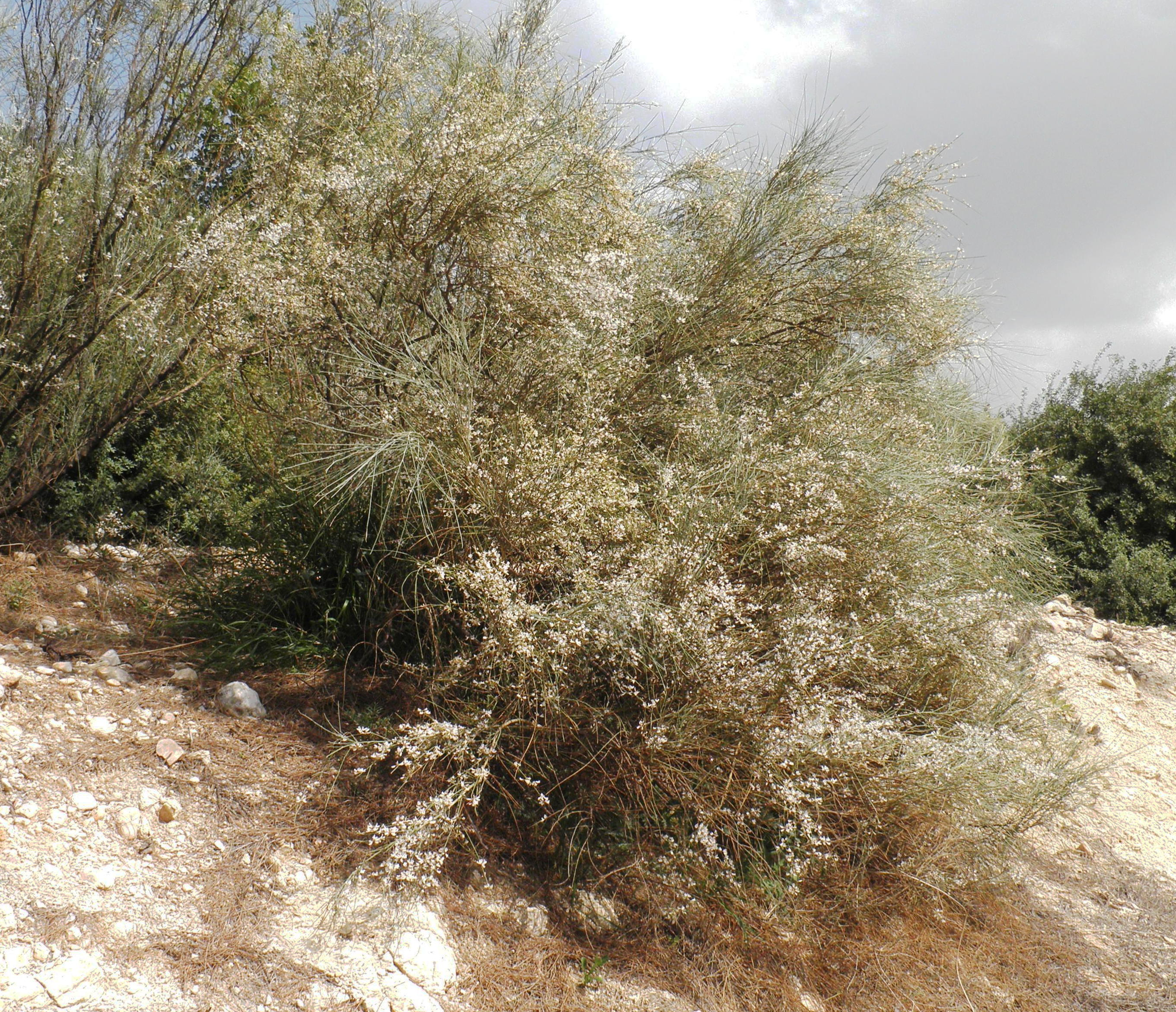
- In habitat

Scientific classification
- Kingdom: Plantae
- Clade: Tracheophytes
- Clade: Angiosperms
- Clade: Eudicots
- Clade: Rosids
- Order: Fabales
- Family: Fabaceae
- Subfamily: Faboideae
- Genus: Retama
- Species: R. raetam

Binomial name
- Retama raetam (Forssk.) Webb & Berthel.

Synonyms
- Genista raetam Forssk.; Lygos raetam (Forssk.) Heywood; Spartium raetam (Forssk.) Spach

= Retama raetam =

Species of plant

Retama raetam is a species of flowering plant in the family Fabaceae, native to northern Africa from the Western Sahara to Sudan, Sicily, Israel, Sinai Peninsula, the Palestine region and Saudi Arabia, and widely naturalized elsewhere.

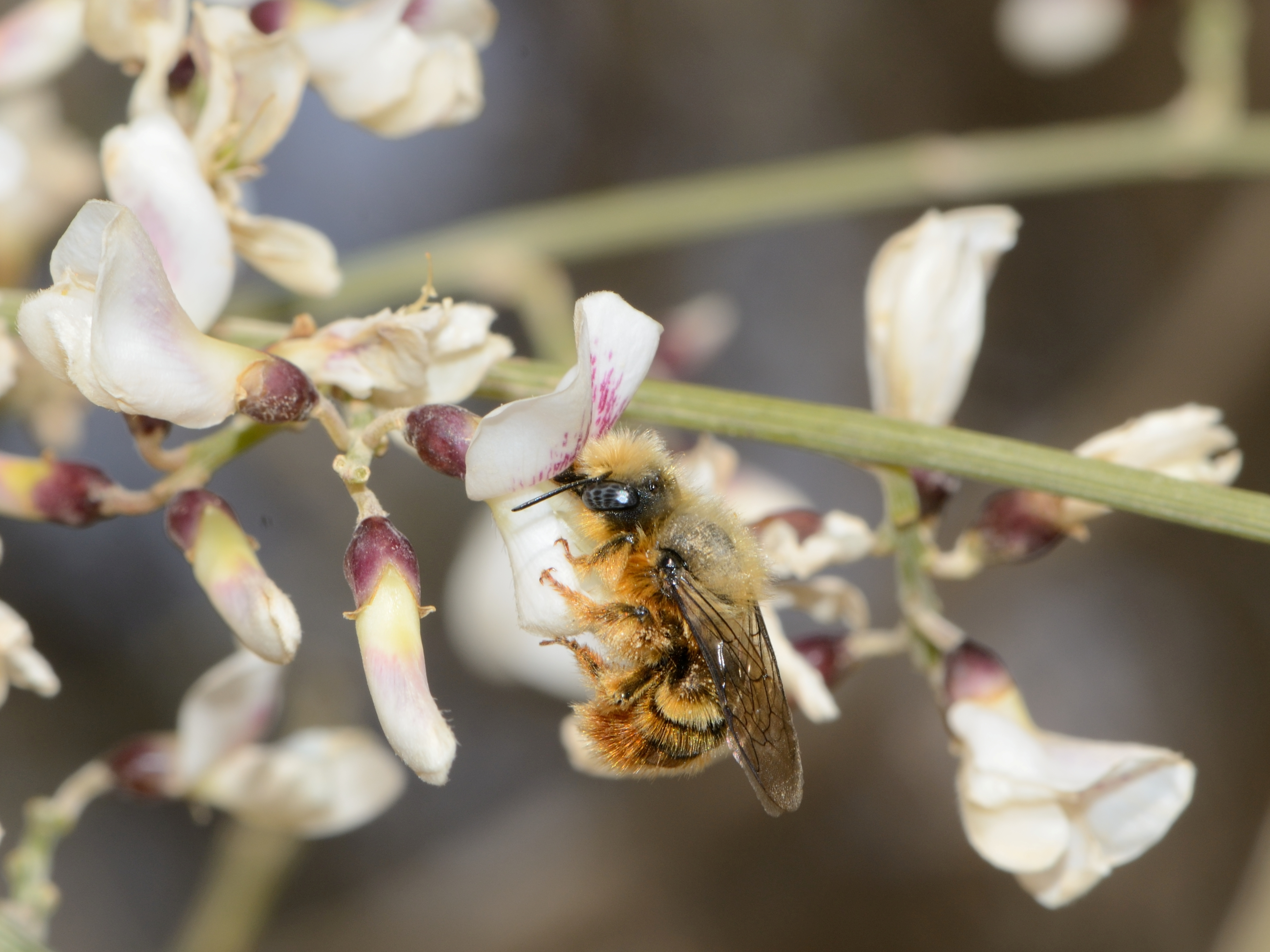
Flowers with pollinating bee, Osmia gracilicornis

== Taxonomy ==
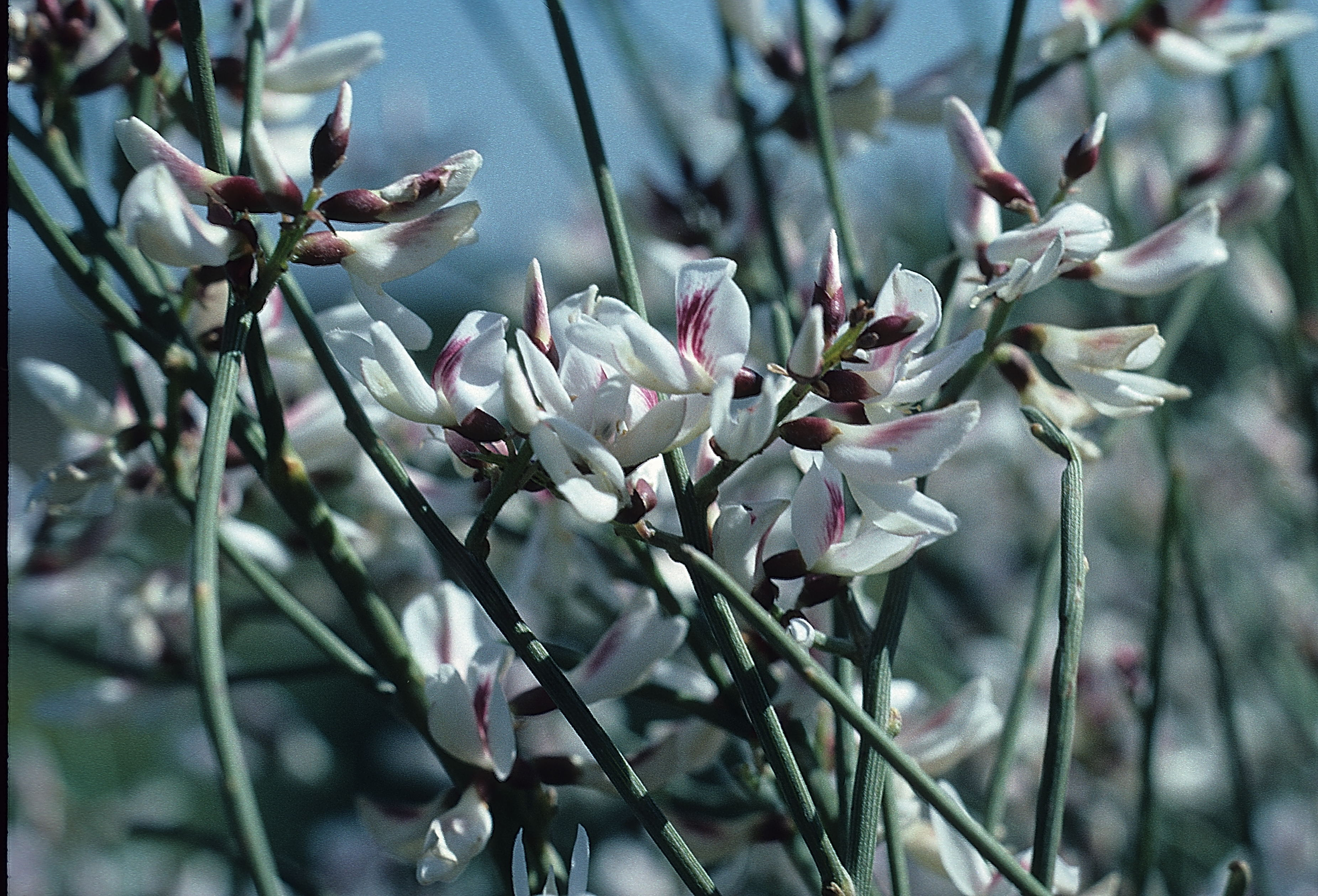
Flowering white Retama, Israel

The species was first described in 1775 by Peter Forsskål as Genista raetam. The epithet was derived from the Hebrew name from the Hebrew Bible. Retama raetam is mentioned in the Hebrew Bible, in Books of Kings and in Book of Job. The Hebrew name is "Rotem", and the translated name is "Broom tree". The species was transferred to Retama by Philip Barker-Webb and Sabin Berthelot in part of a publication that has been dated to 1842. The species that occurs in the Canary Islands is now considered to be Retama rhodorhizoides, rather than R. raetam, although the latter name has been used for Canary Island plants.
