= Bradyrhizobium cytisi =

Scientific classification
- Domain: Bacteria
- Kingdom: Pseudomonadati
- Phylum: Pseudomonadota
- Class: Alphaproteobacteria
- Order: Hyphomicrobiales
- Family: Nitrobacteraceae
- Genus: Bradyrhizobium
- Species: B. cytisi

Binomial name
- Bradyrhizobium cytisi Hirsch and Müller 1986

Type strain
- CECT 7749, CTAW11, LMG 25866, Peix CTAW11

Species of bacterium

Bradyrhizobium cytisi is a bacterium from the genus of Bradyrhizobium.
