= Pseudolabrys =

Labrys

Scientific classification
- Domain: Bacteria
- Kingdom: Pseudomonadati
- Phylum: Pseudomonadota
- Class: Alphaproteobacteria
- Order: Hyphomicrobiales
- Family: Nitrobacteraceae
- Genus: Pseudolabrys; Kämpfer et al. 2006

Type species
- Pseudolabrys taiwanensis

Species
- Pseudolabrys taiwanensis

Genus of bacteria

Pseudolabrys is a genus of bacteria from the family of Nitrobacteraceae. Up to now, only one species of this genus is known (Pseudolabrys taiwanensis).
