= Rhodoplanes elegans =

Scientific classification
- Domain: Bacteria
- Kingdom: Pseudomonadati
- Phylum: Pseudomonadota
- Class: Alphaproteobacteria
- Order: Hyphomicrobiales
- Family: Nitrobacteraceae
- Genus: Rhodoplanes
- Species: R. elegans

Binomial name
- Rhodoplanes elegans Hiraishi and Ueda 1994

Species of bacterium

Rhodoplanes elegans is a phototrophic purple nonsulfur bacteria with rod-shaped cells.
