= Tardiphaga =

Scientific classification
- Domain: Bacteria
- Kingdom: Pseudomonadati
- Phylum: Pseudomonadota
- Class: Alphaproteobacteria
- Order: Hyphomicrobiales
- Family: Nitrobacteraceae
- Genus: Tardiphaga; De Meyer et al. 2012

Type species
- Tardiphaga robiniae

Species
- T. robiniae

Genus of bacteria

Tardiphaga is a genus of gram-negative bacteria from the family Nitrobacteraceae.
