= Rhodoplanes =

Scientific classification
- Domain: Bacteria
- Kingdom: Pseudomonadati
- Phylum: Pseudomonadota
- Class: Alphaproteobacteria
- Order: Hyphomicrobiales
- Family: Nitrobacteraceae
- Genus: Rhodoplanes; Hiraishi and Ueda 1994

Type species
- Rhodoplanes roseus (Janssen and Harfoot 1991) Hiraishi and Ueda 1994

Species
- Rhodoplanes azumiensis Hiraishi 2017; "Rhodoplanes cryptolactis" Okamura et al. 2007; Rhodoplanes elegans Hiraishi and Ueda 1994; Rhodoplanes oryzae Srinivas et al. 2014; Rhodoplanes pokkaliisoli Lakshmi et al. 2009; Rhodoplanes roseus (Janssen and Harfoot 1991) Hiraishi and Ueda 1994; Rhodoplanes serenus Okamura et al. 2009; Rhodoplanes tepidamans Hiraishi and Okamura 2017; Rhodoplanes tepidicaeni Hiraishi 2017

Genus of bacteria

Rhodoplanes is a phototrophic genus of bacteria. Rhodoplanes produces hopanoids such as diplopterol, tetrahymanol, 2-methyldiplopterol, 2-methyltetrahymanol, bacteriohopanetetrol, bacteriohopaneaminotriol and carotenoids like spirilloxanthin, rhodopin, anhydrorhodovibrin, 1,1′-dihydroxylycopene and 3,4,3′,4′-tetrahydrospirilloxanthin
