= Variibacter =

Scientific classification
- Domain: Bacteria
- Kingdom: Pseudomonadati
- Phylum: Pseudomonadota
- Class: Alphaproteobacteria
- Order: Hyphomicrobiales
- Family: Nitrobacteraceae
- Genus: Variibacter; Kim et al. 2014

Type species
- Variibacter gotjawalensis

Species
- V. gotjawalensis

Genus of bacteria

Variibacter is a genus of gram-negative bacteria from the family Nitrobacteraceae with one known species (Variibacter gotjawalensis).
