= Blastobacter =

Scientific classification
- Domain: Bacteria
- Kingdom: Pseudomonadati
- Phylum: Pseudomonadota
- Class: Alphaproteobacteria
- Order: Hyphomicrobiales
- Family: Nitrobacteraceae
- Genus: Blastobacter; Zavarzin 1961

Type species
- Blastobacter henricii

Species
- B. henricii Zavarzin 1961 (Approved Lists 1980); "Blastobacter viscosus" Loginova and Trotsenko 1979

Genus of bacteria

Blastobacter is a genus of bacteria from the family Nitrobacteraceae. Most of the species originally ascribed to Blastobacter have been transferred to other genera, with Blastobacter henricii as the only remaining valid species. To complicate matters, no type strain is available for Blastobacter henricii, so the entire genus may be dismantled.
