= Ramodatodes rufovelutinum =

Scientific classification
- Kingdom: Animalia
- Phylum: Arthropoda
- Class: Insecta
- Order: Coleoptera
- Suborder: Polyphaga
- Infraorder: Cucujiformia
- Family: Cerambycidae
- Genus: Ramodatodes
- Species: R. rufovelutinum

Binomial name
- Ramodatodes rufovelutinum (Fairmaire, 1902)

Species of beetle

Ramodatodes rufovelutinum is a species of beetle in the family Cerambycidae. It was described by Fairmaire in 1902.
