= Bradyrhizobium canariense =

Scientific classification
- Domain: Bacteria
- Kingdom: Pseudomonadati
- Phylum: Pseudomonadota
- Class: Alphaproteobacteria
- Order: Hyphomicrobiales
- Family: Nitrobacteraceae
- Genus: Bradyrhizobium
- Species: B. canariense

Binomial name
- Bradyrhizobium canariense Vinuesa et al. 2005

Species of bacterium

Bradyrhizobium canariense is a species of legume-root nodulating, endosymbiont nitrogen-fixing bacterium. It is acid-tolerant and nodulates endemic genistoid legumes from the Canary Islands. The type strain is BTA-1^{T} (=ATCC BAA-1002^{T} =LMG 22265^{T} =CFNE 1008^{T}).
