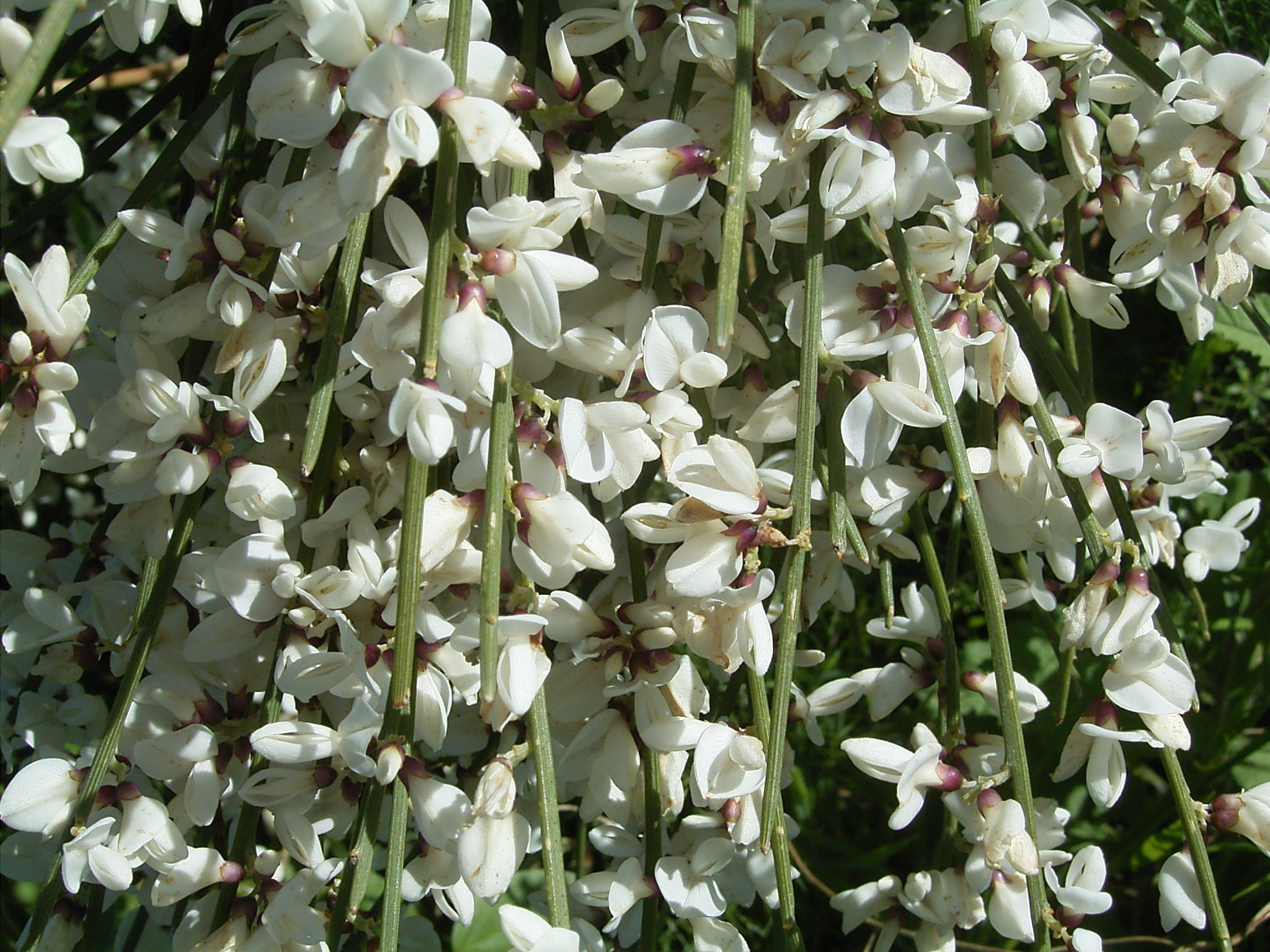
- White flowers of Retama rhodorhizoides

Scientific classification
- Kingdom: Plantae
- Clade: Tracheophytes
- Clade: Angiosperms
- Clade: Eudicots
- Clade: Rosids
- Order: Fabales
- Family: Fabaceae
- Subfamily: Faboideae
- Clade: Core Genistoids
- Tribe: Genisteae
- Genus: Retama; Raf.

Species
- 4–14; see text.

Synonyms
- Boelia Webb (1853); Lygos Adans. (1763), nom. rej.

= Retama =

Genus of legumes

Retama (also known as rotem, Hebrew: רותם) is a genus of flowering bushes in the legume family, Fabaceae. It belongs to the broom tribe, Genisteae. Retama broom bushes are found natively in North Africa, the Levant and some parts of southern Europe. Retama raetam and Retama monosperma have white flowers, while Retama sphaerocarpa has yellow flowers. It remains an open question in taxonomy whether the members of the genus Retama should be incorporated into the genus Genista (see Genisteae).

The species contain cytisine, a toxic alkaloid.

In the Spanish language the name retama is commonly used for broom bushes in general, including the genus Retama.

== Taxonomy ==
The genus Retama was erected in 1838 by Constantine Samuel Rafinesque, the genus name being derived from Hebrew, from the Jewish Bible. Rafinesque noted that the genus had been included in other genera, including Spartium, Cytisus and Genista, but he regarded it as distinct.

The name Lygos was once used for Retama; it is now a rejected name (nomen rejiciendum) in the International Code of Nomenclature for algae, fungi, and plants. Michel Adanson described and classified the genus referencing to the Greek plant "lygos" and to Pedanius Dioscorides. In the ancient Greek language, lygos (λύγος) was the name of the plant Vitex agnus-castus (chaste tree) or willow or other plants with pliant twigs. The same word (in some cases Latinized as Lygus) was used in botany and zoology for various taxonomic groups as a component of names, e.g. Lygodysodea, Lygisyum, Lygistum, Lygodesmia etc.

Retama is traditionally placed in the tribe Genisteae, and in the subfamily Papilionoideae in the 2017 classification of the family Fabaceae (Leguminosae).

== Species ==
The number of species in the genus and their circumscription varies. As of September 2023, Plants of the World Online, based on the African Plant Database, accepted the following species:

- Retama dasycarpa Coss.
- Retama monosperma (L.) Boiss.
- Retama raetam (Forssk.) Webb & Berthel.
- Retama rhodorhizoides (Webb & Berthel.) Webb & Berthel.
- Retama sphaerocarpa (L.) Boiss.

R. rhodorhizoides is included in R. monosperma by some sources, and has been identified as R. raetam by others. When recognized as a separate species, it is restricted to the Canary Islands.

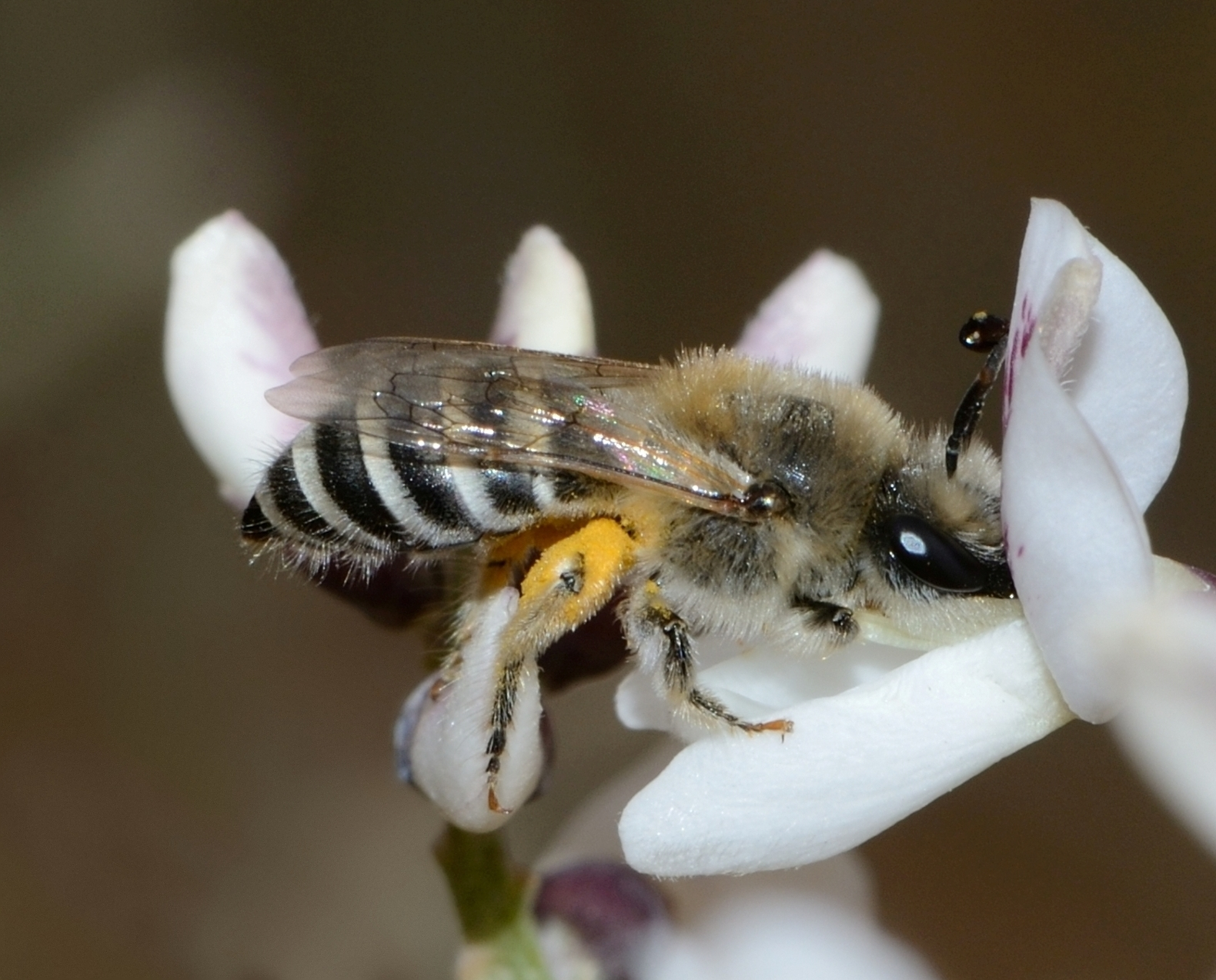
Female bee (Colletes sp.) collecting nectar from a Retama raetam flower, Holot Mash'abim, Northern Negev, Israel

== Cultural significance ==
Retama may be mentioned in the Bible, in I Kings 19:4, Psalms 120:4, and Job 30:4, under the name rotem (Heb. רוֹתֶם/רֹתֶם). According to multiple Jewish biblical commentators, Retama is used in the Bible as a symbol of slander, as, when burnt, its embers will remain hot long after they turn black. However, this translation is contested, with other commentators translating the word as "juniper".
