= Bradyrhizobium lupini =

Scientific classification
- Domain: Bacteria
- Kingdom: Pseudomonadati
- Phylum: Pseudomonadota
- Class: Alphaproteobacteria
- Order: Hyphomicrobiales
- Family: Nitrobacteraceae
- Genus: Bradyrhizobium
- Species: B. lupini

Binomial name
- Bradyrhizobium lupini Peix et al. 2015

Type strain
- 3C231, ATCC 10319, BCRC 17460, CCRC 17460, DSM 30140, IAM 12610, IFO 14781, JCM 20681, KACC 10747, NBRC 100381, NBRC 14781, OUT 30004, VKM B-1965

Synonyms
- Rhizobium lupini

Species of bacterium

Bradyrhizobium lupini is a bacterium from the genus of Bradyrhizobium.
