= Bradyrhizobium valentinum =

Scientific classification
- Domain: Bacteria
- Kingdom: Pseudomonadati
- Phylum: Pseudomonadota
- Class: Alphaproteobacteria
- Order: Hyphomicrobiales
- Family: Nitrobacteraceae
- Genus: Bradyrhizobium
- Species: B. valentinum

Binomial name
- Bradyrhizobium valentinum Duran et al. 2014

Type strain
- LmjM2, LmjM3, LmjM6, CECT 8364, LMG 2761

Species of bacterium

Bradyrhizobium valentinum is a bacterium from the genus Bradyrhizobium which has been isolated from the nodules of the plant Lupinus mariae-josephae in Spain.
