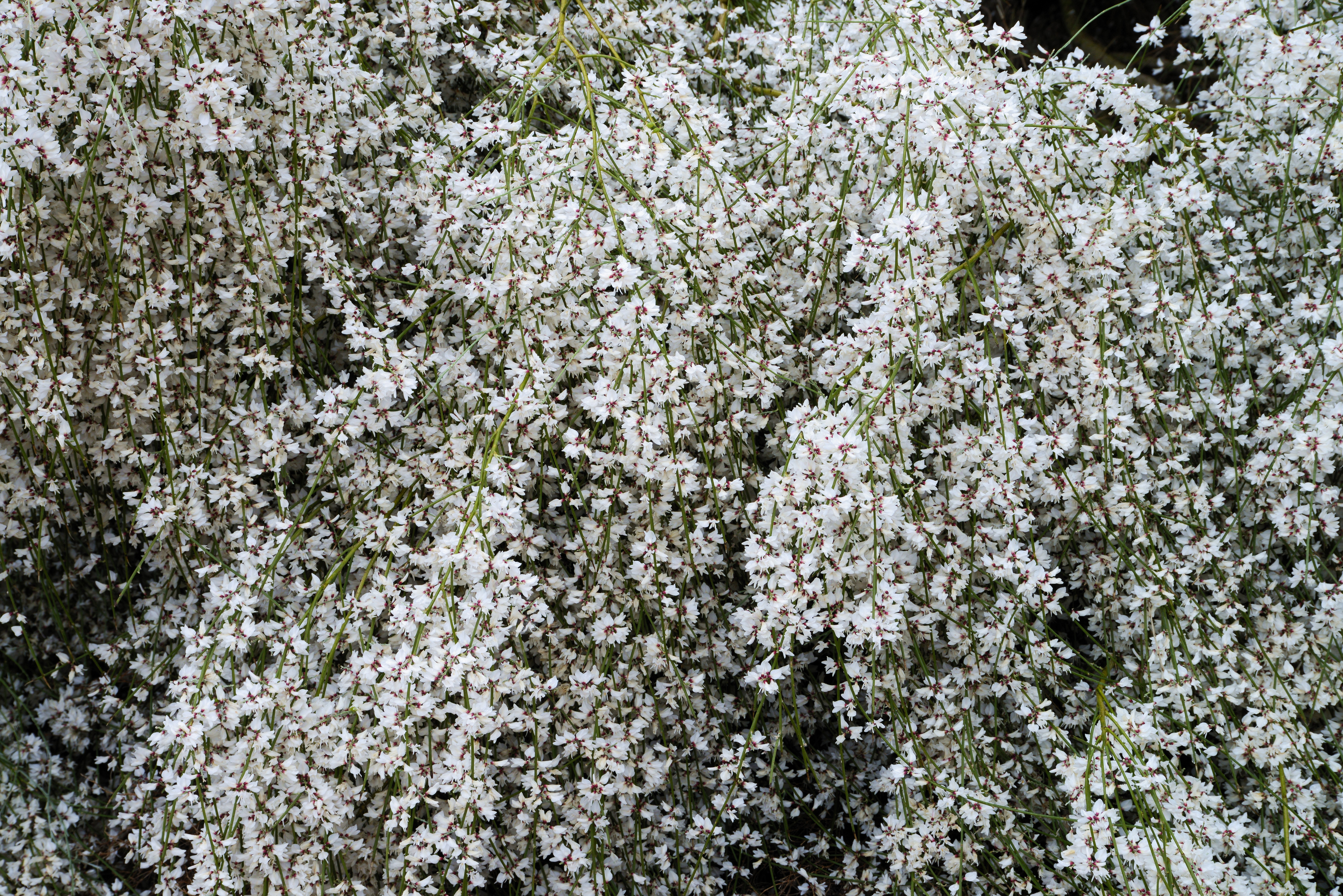

Scientific classification
- Kingdom: Plantae
- Clade: Tracheophytes
- Clade: Angiosperms
- Clade: Eudicots
- Clade: Rosids
- Order: Fabales
- Family: Fabaceae
- Subfamily: Faboideae
- Genus: Retama
- Species: R. monosperma

Binomial name
- Retama monosperma (L.) Boiss.

Synonyms
- Lygos monosperma (L.) Heywood; Genista defoliata Lam.; Genista monosperma (L.) Lam.; Retama webbii (Spach) Webb; Spartium gracile Salisb.; Spartium monospermum L.; Spartium clusii Spach; Spartium dubium Spach; Spartium rhodorhizoides Walp., not validly publ.; Spartium rostratum Spach, nom. illeg.; Spartium webbii Spach

= Retama monosperma =

Species of flowering plant

Retama monosperma, the bridal broom or bridal veil broom, is a flowering bush species in the genus Retama, native to the parts of the Mediterranean Basin (Algeria, Morocco, Portugal and Spain in the west, Egypt, the East Aegean Islands and Greece in the east). It has been introduced elsewhere.

Retama monosperma forms root nodules with Ensifer fredii. The larvae of the moths Phyllonorycter hesperiella and Phyllonorycter spartocytisi feed on R. monosperma.

The seeds contain cytisine, a toxic alkaloid. Fifteen other quinolizidine and three dipiperidine alkaloids can also be isolated from different parts of the plant. In particular, the presence of (+)-sparteine, α- and β-isosparteine, (+)-17-oxosparteine, (-)-lupanine, 5,6-dehydrolupanine, (-)-anagyrine, (-)-N-methylcytisine and (+)-ammodendrine can be detected.
