= Rhodopseudomonas =

Scientific classification
- Domain: Bacteria
- Kingdom: Pseudomonadati
- Phylum: Pseudomonadota
- Class: Alphaproteobacteria
- Order: Hyphomicrobiales
- Family: Nitrobacteraceae
- Genus: Rhodopseudomonas; Czurda and Maresch 1937

Type species
- Rhodopseudomonas palustris (Molisch 1907) van Niel 1944

Species
- "Rhodopseudomonas boonkerdii" Noisangiam et al. 2010; "Rhodopseudomonas cryptolactis" Stadtwald-Demchick et al. 1990; Rhodopseudomonas faecalis Zhang et al. 2002; Rhodopseudomonas harwoodiae Venkata Ramana et al. 2012; Rhodopseudomonas julia Kompantseva 1993; Rhodopseudomonas palustris (Molisch 1907) van Niel 1944 (Approved Lists 1980); Rhodopseudomonas parapalustris Venkata Ramana et al. 2012; Rhodopseudomonas pentothenatexigens Kumar et al. 2013; Rhodopseudomonas pseudopalustris Venkata Ramana et al. 2012; Rhodopseudomonas rhenobacensis Hougardy et al. 2000; Rhodopseudomonas telluris Hiraishi and Okamura 2017; Rhodopseudomonas thermotolerans Kumar et al. 2013

Synonyms
- "Metalliresistens" Noisangiam et al. 2010

Genus of bacteria

Rhodopseudomonas is a genus of gram-negative bacteria from the family Nitrobacteraceae.

== Phylogeny ==
The currently accepted taxonomy is based on the List of Prokaryotic names with Standing in Nomenclature (LPSN). The phylogeny is based on whole-genome analysis.

- - Rhodopseudomonas
    - Rhodopseudomonas faecalis
    - - Rhodopseudomonas pentothenatexigens
      - Rhodopseudomonas pseudopalustris
  - outgroup
    Bradyrhizobium
