= Afipia felis =

Scientific classification
- Domain: Bacteria
- Kingdom: Pseudomonadati
- Phylum: Pseudomonadota
- Class: Alphaproteobacteria
- Order: Hyphomicrobiales
- Family: Nitrobacteraceae
- Genus: Afipia
- Species: A. felis

Binomial name
- Afipia felis Brenner et al. 1991

Species of bacterium

Afipia felis is the type species of the Afipia bacterial genus. It was formerly thought to cause cat-scratch disease. It is a Gram-negative, oxidase-positive, nonfermentative rod in the alpha-2 subgroup of the class Proteobacteria. It is motile by means of a single flagellum. It is noted for having the longest authority citation of any accepted species.
