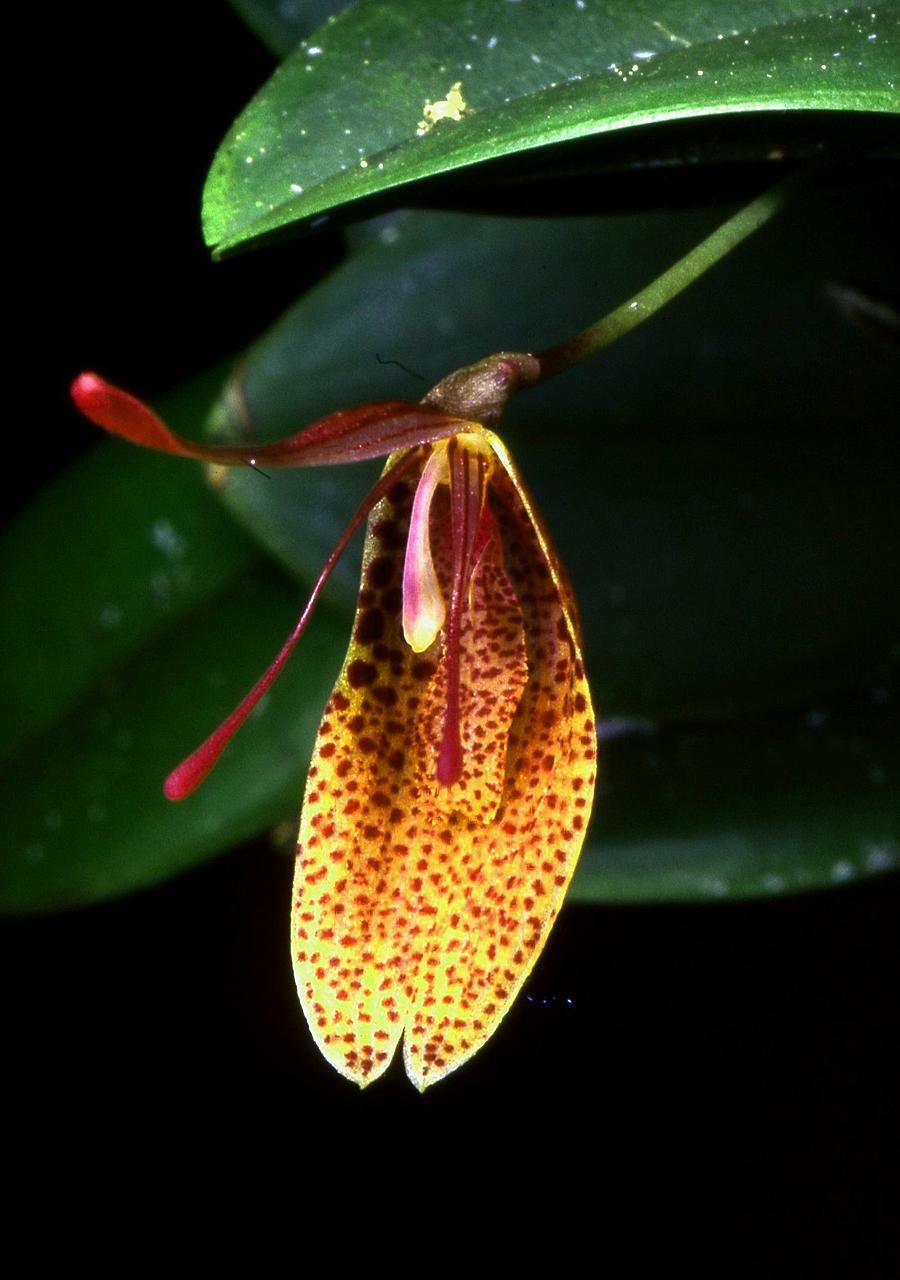
- Flower of Restrepia elegans

Scientific classification
- Kingdom: Plantae
- Clade: Tracheophytes
- Clade: Angiosperms
- Clade: Monocots
- Order: Asparagales
- Family: Orchidaceae
- Subfamily: Epidendroideae
- Genus: Restrepia
- Species: R. elegans

Binomial name
- Restrepia elegans H.Karst.

Synonyms
- Restrepia antennifera subsp. erythroxantha (Rchb.f.) H.Mohr; Restrepia erythroxantha Rchb.f.; Restrepia leopardina Rolfe; Restrepia punctulata Lindl.

= Restrepia elegans =

Species of orchid

Restrepia elegans, commonly called the elegant restrepia, is a species of flowering plant in the family Orchidaceae. It is native to Colombia and northwestern Venezuela.
