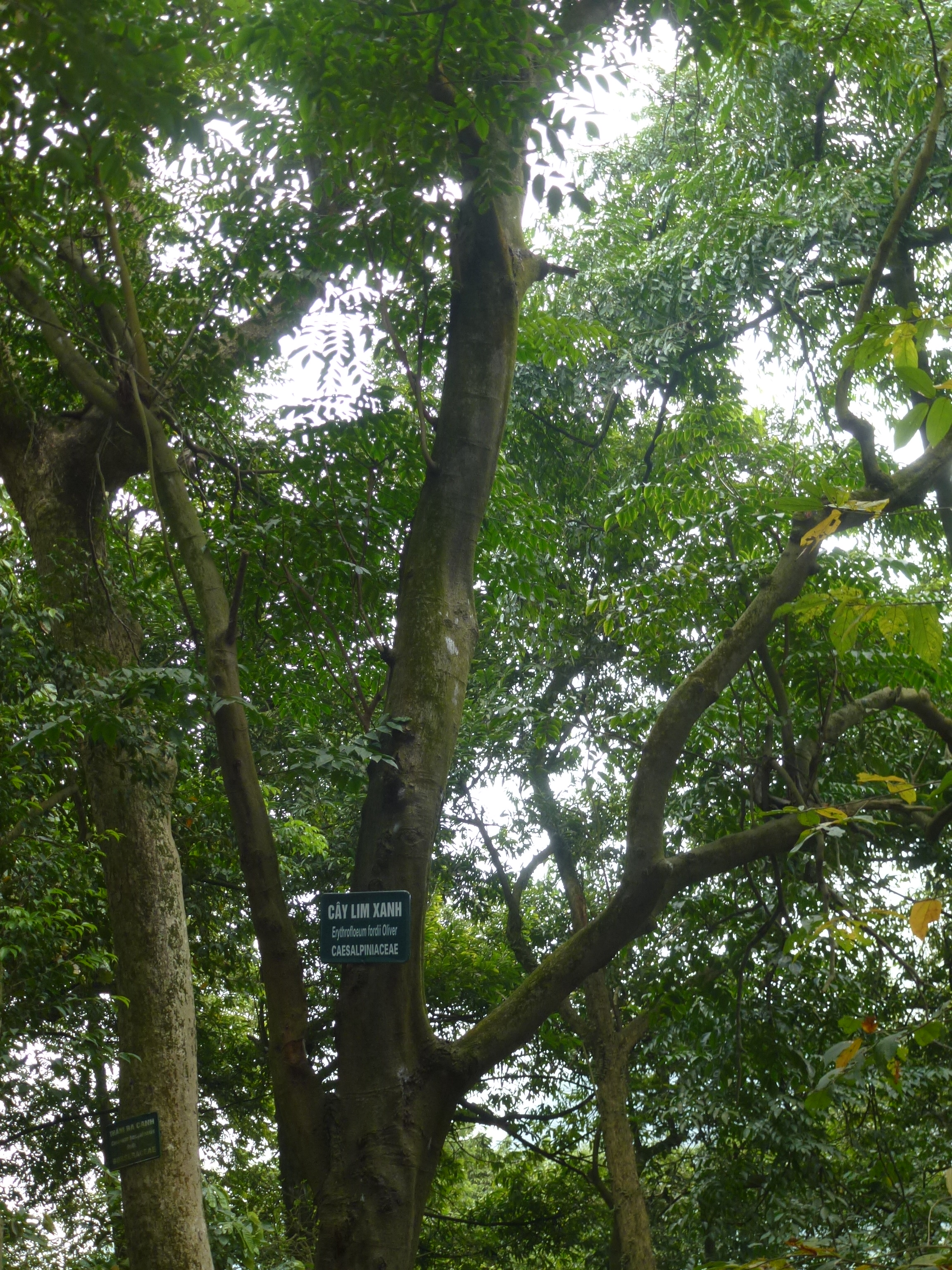

Conservation status
- Endangered (IUCN 2.3)

Scientific classification
- Kingdom: Plantae
- Clade: Tracheophytes
- Clade: Angiosperms
- Clade: Eudicots
- Clade: Rosids
- Order: Fabales
- Family: Fabaceae
- Subfamily: Caesalpinioideae
- Genus: Erythrophleum
- Species: E. fordii

Binomial name
- Erythrophleum fordii Oliv.

= Erythrophleum fordii =

Species of legume

Erythrophleum fordii is a species of plant in the family Fabaceae. It is a tree about 10 metres (33 ft) tall, occasionally reaching 30 metres. It is found in southeastern China, Taiwan, and Vietnam. It is a valuable timber tree threatened by overexploitation. It is under second-class national protection in China.
