= Synsepal =

Floral structure formed by the partial or complete fusion of two or more sepals

A synsepal is a floral structure formed by the partial or complete fusion of two or more sepals. Such sepals are said to be synsepalous or gamosepalous.

It is common among lady's slipper orchids (Cypripedioideae) that the two lateral sepals are connate to form a synsepal in the outer whorl. This is located directly behind the pouch, opposite the upward-pointing dorsal sepal.

Synsepals may be bifid, i.e. divided into two equal lobes, or forked and divided in two by a deep cleft.
