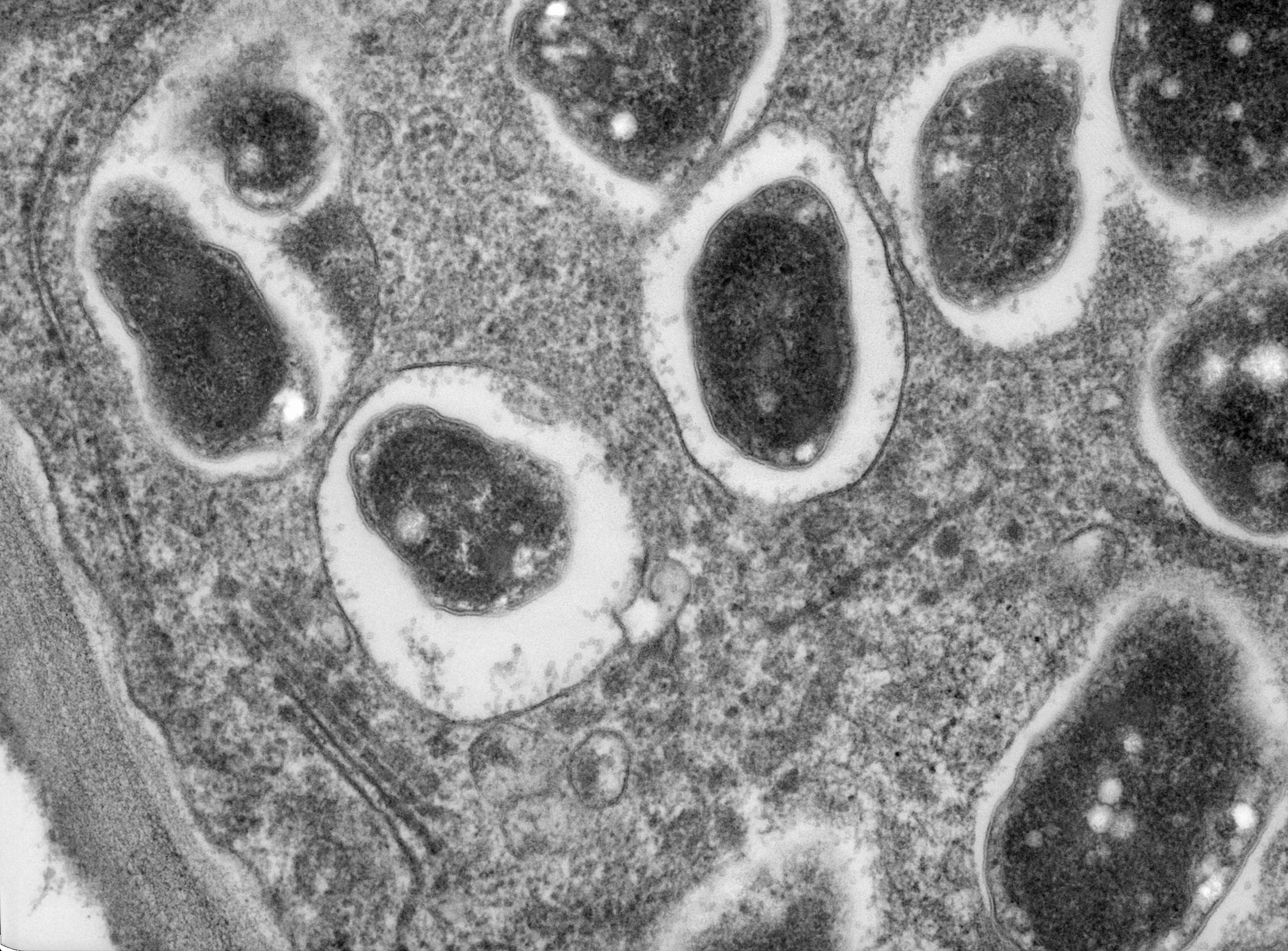
- Cross section though a soybean (Glycine max 'Essex') root nodule. Bradyrhizobium japonicum infects the roots and establishes a nitrogen fixing symbiosis. This high magnification image shows part of a cell with single bacteroids within their symbiosomes

Scientific classification
- Domain: Bacteria
- Kingdom: Pseudomonadati
- Phylum: Pseudomonadota
- Class: Alphaproteobacteria
- Order: Hyphomicrobiales
- Family: Nitrobacteraceae
- Genus: Bradyrhizobium; Jordan 1982

Type species
- Bradyrhizobium japonicum

Species
- See text

Synonyms
- Agromonas Ohta and Hattori 1985; "Photorhizobium" Eaglesham et al. 1990; "Phytomyxa" Schroeter 1886

= Bradyrhizobium =

Genus of bacteria

Bradyrhizobium is a genus of Gram-negative soil bacteria, many of which fix nitrogen. Nitrogen fixation is an important part of the nitrogen cycle. Plants cannot use atmospheric nitrogen (N_{2}); they must use nitrogen compounds such as nitrates.

== Characteristics ==
Bradyrhizobium species are Gram-negative bacilli (rod-shaped) with a single subpolar or polar flagellum. They are common soil-dwelling micro-organisms that can form symbiotic relationships with leguminous plant species where they fix nitrogen in exchange for carbohydrates from the plant. Like other rhizobia, many members of this genus have the ability to fix atmospheric nitrogen into forms readily available for other organisms to use. Bradyrhizobia are also major components of forest soil microbial communities, where strains isolated from these soils are not typically capable of nitrogen fixation or nodulation. They are slow-growing in contrast to Rhizobium species, which are considered fast-growing rhizobia. In a liquid medium, Bradyrhizobium species take 3–5 days to create a moderate turbidity and 6–8 hours to double in population size. They tend to grow best with pentoses as carbon sources. Some strains (for example, USDA 6 and CPP) are capable of oxidizing carbon monoxide aerobically.

== Taxonomy ==
=== Accepted species ===
Bradyrhizobium comprises the following species:

- B. agreste Klepa et al. 2021
- B. algeriense Ahnia et al. 2019
- B. americanum Ramírez-Bahena et al. 2017
- B. amphicarpaeae Bromfield et al. 2019
- B. arachidis Wang et al. 2013
- B. archetypum Helene et al. 2020
- B. australiense Helene et al. 2020
- B. betae Rivas et al. 2004
- B. cajani Araújo et al. 2017
- B. canariense Vinuesa et al. 2005
- B. centrosematis corrig. Ramírez-Bahena et al. 2017
- B. cosmicum Wasai-Hara et al. 2020
- B. cytisi Chahbourne et al. 2011
- B. daqingense Wang JY et al. 2012
- B. denitrificans (Hirsch and Müller 1986) van Berkum et al. 2011
- B. diazoefficiens Delamuta et al 2013
- B. diversitatis Serenato Klepa et al. 2021
- B. elkanii Kuykendall et al. 1993
- B. embrapense Delamuta et al.2015
- B. erythrophlei Yao et al. 2015
- B. ferriligni Yao et al. 2015
- B. frederickii de Oliveira Urquiaga et al. 2019
- B. ganzhouense Lu et al. 2014
- B. glycinis Serenato Klepa et al. 2021
- B. guangdongense Li et al. 2015
- B. guangxiense Li et al. 2015
- B. hipponense Rejili et al. 2020
- B. huanghuaihaiense Zhang et al. 2012
- B. icense Durán et al. 2014
- B. ingae da Silva et al. 2014
- B. iriomotense Islam et al. 2010
- B. ivorense Fossou et al. 2020
- B. japonicum (Kirchner 1896) Jordan 1982
  - symbiovar genistearum
  - symbiovar glycinearum
- B. jicamae Ramírez-Bahena et al. 2009
- B. kavangense Lasse gronemeyer et al. 2015
- B. lablabi Chang et al. 2011
- B. liaoningense Xu et al. 1995
- B. lupini Peix et al. 2015
- B. manausense Silva et al. 2014
- B. mercantei Helene et al. 2017
- B. murdochi Helene et al. 2020
- B. namibiense Grönemeyer et al. 2017
- B. nanningense Li et al. 2020
- B. neotropicale Zilli et al. 2014
- B. niftali Klepa et al. 2019
- B. nitroreducens Jang et al. 2020
- B. oligotrophicum (Ohta and Hattori 1985) Ramírez-Bahena et al. 2013
- B. ottawaense Yu et al. 2014
- B. pachyrhizi Ramírez-Bahena et al. 2009
- B. paxllaeri Durán et al. 2014
- B. retamae Guerrouj et al. 2013
- B. rifense Chahboune et al. 2012
- B. ripae Bünger et al. 2018
- B. shewense Aserse et al. 2018
- B. stylosanthis Marçon Delamuta et al. 2016
- B. subterraneum Gronemeyer et al. 2015
- B. symbiodeficiens Bromfield et al. 2020
- B. tropiciagri Delamuta et al. 2015
- B. vignae Grönemeyer et al. 2016
- B. viridifuturi Helene et al. 2015
- B. yuanmingense Yao et al. 2002

=== Provisional species ===
The following species have been published, but not validated according to the Bacteriological Code.

- "B. brasilense" Martins da Costa et al. 2017
- "B. campsiandrae" Cabral Michel et al. 2021
- "B. centrolobii" Michel et al. 2017
- "B. forestalis" Martins da Costa et al. 2018
- "B. guangzhouense" Li et al. 2019
- "B. macuxiense" Michel et al. 2017
- "B. sacchari" de Matos et al. 2017
- "Photorhizobium thompsonianum" Eaglesham et al. 1990
- "B. uaiense" Cabral Michel et al. 2020
- "B. valentinum" Durán et al. 2014
- "B. zhanjiangense" Li et al. 2019

== Phylogeny ==
The currently accepted taxonomy is based on the List of Prokaryotic names with Standing in Nomenclature (LPSN). The phylogeny is based on whole-genome analysis.

- - Bradyrhizobium
    - Bradyrhizobium oligotrophicum
    - - - Bradyrhizobium manausense
        - - Bradyrhizobium neotropicale
          - - - Bradyrhizobium yuanmingense
              - - Bradyrhizobium ottawaense
                - Bradyrhizobium shewense
            - - - Bradyrhizobium stylosanthis
                - Bradyrhizobium arachidis
              - - Bradyrhizobium diazoefficiens
                - Bradyrhizobium japonicum
      - - - - Bradyrhizobium retamae
            - Bradyrhizobium icense
          - - Bradyrhizobium lablabi
            - - Bradyrhizobium jicamae
              - Bradyrhizobium paxllaeri
        - - - Bradyrhizobium elkanii
            - Bradyrhizobium pachyrhizi
          - - Bradyrhizobium mercantei
            - - Bradyrhizobium embrapense
              - - Bradyrhizobium tropiciagri
                - Bradyrhizobium viridifuturi
  - outgroup
    Rhodopseudomonas

== Nodulation ==
=== Nodule formation ===
Nodules are growths on the roots of leguminous plants where the bacteria reside. The plant roots secrete amino acids and sugars into the rhizosphere. The rhizobia move toward the roots and attach to the root hairs. The plant then releases flavonoids, which induce the expression of nod genes within the bacteria. The expression of these genes results in the production of enzymes called Nod factors that initiate root hair curling. During this process, the rhizobia are curled up with the root hair. The rhizobia penetrate the root hair cells with an infection thread that grows through the root hair into the main root. This causes the infected cells to divide and form a nodule. The rhizobia can now begin nitrogen fixation.

=== Nod genes ===
Over 55 genes are known to be associated with nodulation. NodD is essential for the expression of the other nod genes. The two different nodD genes are: nodD_{1} and nodD_{2}. Only nodD_{1} is needed for successful nodulation.

== Nitrogen fixation ==
Bradyrhizobium and other rhizobia take atmospheric nitrogen and fix it into ammonia (NH_{3}) or ammonium (NH_{4}^{+}). Plants cannot use atmospheric nitrogen; they must use a combined or fixed form of the element. After photosynthesis, nitrogen fixation (or uptake) is the most important process for the growth and development of plants. The levels of ureide nitrogen in a plant correlate with the amount of fixed nitrogen the plant takes up.

=== Genes ===
Nif and fix are important genes involved in nitrogen fixation among Bradyrhizobium species. Nif genes are very similar to genes found in Klebsiella pneumoniae, a free-living diazotroph. The genes found in bradyrhizobia have similar function and structure to the genes found in K. pneumoniae. Fix genes are important for symbiotic nitrogen fixation and were first discovered in rhizobia species. The nif and fix genes are found in at least two different clusters on the chromosome. Cluster I contains most of the nitrogen fixation genes. Cluster II contains three fix genes located near nod genes.

== Diversity ==
This genus of bacteria can form either specific or general symbioses; one species of Bradyrhizobium may only be able to nodulate one legume species, whereas other Bradyrhizobium species may be able to nodulate several legume species. Ribosomal RNA is highly conserved in this group of microbes, making Bradyrhizobium extremely difficult to use as an indicator of species diversity. DNA–DNA hybridizations have been used instead and show more diversity. However, few phenotypic differences are seen, so not many species have been named.

Some strains are photosynthetic, these Bradyrhizobium often form nodules in the stems of semi-aquatic Aeschynomene legumes, and have also been found in the nodal roots of African wild rice Oryza breviligulata.

== Significance ==
Grain legumes are cultivated on about 1.5 million km^{2} of land per year. The amount of nitrogen fixed annually is about 44–66 million tons worldwide, providing almost half of all nitrogen used in agriculture. Commercial inoculants of Bradyrhizobium are available.

Bradyrhizobium has also been identified as a contaminant of DNA extraction kit reagents and ultrapure water systems, which may lead to its erroneous appearance in microbiota or metagenomic datasets. The presence of nitrogen-fixing bacteria as contaminants may be due to the use of nitrogen gas in ultrapure water production to inhibit microbial growth in storage tanks.

== Notable species ==
- Bradyrhizobium betae was isolated from tumor-like root deformations on sugar beets; they have an unknown symbiotic status.
- Bradyrhizobium elkanii, Bradyrhizobium diazoefficiens, and Bradyrhizobium liaoningense establish symbiosis with soybeans.
- Bradyrhizobium japonicum nodulates soybeans, cowpeas, mung beans, and siratro.
- Bradyrhizobium yuanmingense nodulates Lespedeza.
- Bradyrhizobium canariense nodulates genistoid legumes endemic to the Canary Islands. It has also been found in lupin and serradella nodules in western Australia and southern Africa.
