= Nitrobacteraceae =

Scientific classification
- Domain: Bacteria
- Kingdom: Pseudomonadati
- Phylum: Pseudomonadota
- Class: Alphaproteobacteria
- Order: Hyphomicrobiales
- Family: Nitrobacteraceae corrig. Buchanan 1917 (Approved Lists 1980)

Genera
- Afipia Brenner et al. 1992; Blastobacter Zavarzin 1961 (Approved Lists 1980); Bradyrhizobium Jordan 1982; Nitrobacter Winogradsky 1892 (Approved Lists 1980); Pseudolabrys Kämpfer et al. 2006; Pseudorhodoplanes Tirandaz et al. 2015; Rhodoplanes Hiraishi and Ueda 1994; Rhodopseudomonas Czurda and Maresch 1937 (Approved Lists 1980); Tardiphaga De Meyer et al. 2012; Variibacter Kim et al. 2014

Synonyms
- Nitrobacteriaceae Buchanan 1917 (Approved Lists 1980); Bradyrhizobiaceae Garrity et al. 2006

Family of bacteria

The Nitrobacteraceae are a family of gram-negative, aerobic bacteria. They include plant-associated bacteria such as Bradyrhizobium, a genus of rhizobia associated with some legumes. It also contains animal-associated bacteria such as Afipia felis, formerly thought to cause cat-scratch disease. Others are free-living, such as Rhodopseudomonas, a purple bacterium found in marine water and soils. The strain Rhodopseudomonas palustris DX-1 can generate an electric current with no hydrogen production, a trait being explored in the development of the microbial fuel cell. The genus Afipia has also been found in the atmosphere, where it uses methylsulfonylmethane as a carbon source.

The bacteria of this family derive their energy from oxidizing ammonia to nitrite, or by oxidizing nitrite to nitrate. They are commonly found in freshwater and soil.

== Phylogeny ==
The currently accepted taxonomy is based on the List of Prokaryotic names with Standing in Nomenclature (LPSN). The phylogeny is based on whole-genome analysis.

- - Nitrobacteraceae
    - Variibacter
    - - - Pseudorhodoplanes
        - Pseudolabrys
      - - Afipia
        - - Rhodopseudomonas
          - Bradyrhizobium
  - outgroup
    Phreatobacteraceae

== See also ==
- Nitrogen cycle
- Nitrite
- Nitrate
