= Spirillum volutans =

Scientific classification
- Domain: Bacteria
- Kingdom: Pseudomonadati
- Phylum: Pseudomonadota
- Class: Betaproteobacteria
- Order: Nitrosomonadales
- Family: Spirillaceae
- Genus: Spirillum
- Species: S. volutans

Binomial name
- Spirillum volutans Ehrenberg 1832

Type strain
- M34131

Species of bacterium

Spirillum volutans is a gram-negative, bacterium from the genus of Spirillum which occurs in freshwater. It has an amphitrichous flagellar arrangement. Spirillum volutans is one of the largest bacteria species.
