= Methylobacillus flagellatus =

Scientific classification
- Domain: Bacteria
- Kingdom: Pseudomonadati
- Phylum: Pseudomonadota
- Class: Betaproteobacteria
- Order: Methylophilaceae
- Genus: Methylobacillus
- Species: M. flagellatus

Binomial name
- Methylobacillus flagellatus Govorukhina et al. 1998

Species of bacterium

Methylobacillus flagellatus is a species of aerobic bacteria.

== Description and significance ==
Methylobacillus is a group of methylotrophic aerobic bacteria, and they can be found in large numbers in marine and fresh water ecosystems. These organisms are one of Earth's most important carbon recyclers, and they recycle such important carbon compounds as methane, methanol, and methylated amines on Earth. “In general methylotrophs can use green-house gases such as carbon dioxide and methane as substrates to fulfill their energy and carbon needs.” Furthermore, strong scientific evidences indicate that a subset group of methylotrophs, the methanotrophs, play huge roles in global warming and groundwater contamination. According to Bonnie et al., methane gas is far more efficient at absorbing infrared radiation than carbon dioxide gas, and “the concentration of methane has been increasing at an alarming rate of 1% per year for the last 150 year to 200 years.” The role that these methylotrophs play in carbon cycling may help us understand, and eventually combat global warming. Thus, it is imperative for researchers to classify, and study methylotrophic bacteria.

One such important methylotroph of interest is Methylobacillus flagellatus KT strain. Methylobacillus flagellatus was first isolated in the early 1980s in sewerage pipes of a metropolitan sanitary sewer. “M. flagellatus is most closely related to other members of the family Methylophilaceae.” The shape of M. flagellatus is an oval shape, with multiple flagella originating from opposite poles of the bacteria. Using small-subunit 16S rRNAs and comparing metabolic/phylogenic similarities and differences< between M. flagellatus and its relatives, scientists have determined that Methylobacillus flagellatus (betaproteobacteria) is more closely related to Methylobacterium extorquens (alphaproteobacteria) and Methylococcus capsulatus (gammaproteobacteria), than to Methylibium petroleiphilum (betaproteobacteria).

== Genome structure ==
The genome of Methylobacillus flagellatus is a circular chromosome that is approximately 3Mbp long, and it encodes about 2,766 proteins. According to Chistoserdova et al., M. flagellatus’ genome does not code for three enzymes of the tricarboxylic acid cycle (TCA cycle). The failure of M. flagellatus to produce these three enzymes (dehydrogenases) means that it can only rely on one-carbon compounds as carbon substrates for the production of precursor molecules, and for its energy needs. The ability to use only one-carbon substrates automatically makes M. flagellatus an obligate methylotroph.

Overall characteristics of the M. flagellatus genome include 53.7% GC content and 143,032 base pairs that are direct repeats. Furthermore, there are approximately 2,766 coding regions, and only 233 open reading frames (ORFs) are unique to M. flagellatus. The genome also contains a CRISPR region, which is functionally linked to lateral gene transfer, host cell defense, replication, and regulation.

== Ecology ==
A recent attempt at phylogeny classification of obligate methylotrophs puts the genus Methylobacillus along with Methylophilus and Methylovorus as terrestrial methylobacteria, while marine obligate methylotrophs are assigned to the genus Methylophaga. Methylobacillus flagellatus KT strain was found in a metropolitan sewer system, whereas Methylobacillus pratensis were isolated from meadow grass. The important point is that the methylotrophs are very adaptable and they can be found in diverse ecosystems.

As mentioned before, the importance of studying M. flagellatus and other closely related species of methylobacteria will help us better understand the recycling of carbon on Earth. More specifically a better understanding of how these methylotrophs affect the carbon cycle would undoubtedly help us shed light on the effects of methane gas on global warming. “Approximately 10^3 megatons of methane are produced globally each year by anaerobic micro-organisms.” A subgroup of methylotrophs, the methanotrophs, oxidizes roughly %80-90 of the global methane. The significance of this fact cannot be overlooked, because without these methanotrophs the vast majority of atmospheric methane would not get degraded. The accumulation of methane gas would cause the Earth's temperature to rise dramatically, because methane gas is far more efficient at absorbing infrared radiation than carbon-dioxide gas, and “may contribute more [than carbon dioxide] to global warming.”

== Pathology ==
No known pathogenic quality of M. flagellatus has been discovered.

== Application to biotechnology ==
Specific characteristics of M. flagellatus such as its high coefficient of conversion of oxidizers (methanol) to its own biomass allows for practical applications such as inexpensive industrial productions of commercially needed compounds. These compounds can range from heterologous proteins and amino-acids to vitamins. Some methylotrophs within the genus of Methylobacillus can even use organic compounds such as the pesticide carbofuran and choline as carbon raw materials; they use these carbon sources to fulfill their energy and carbon requirements. As early as the late 1980s researchers had known that some methylotrophs possess enzymes such as dichloromethane dehalogenase, or methane monooxygenase (MMO), which degrade various environmental pollutants (i.e.: alkanes, alkenes, and mono- and poly-substituted aromatic compounds). Another common environmental pollutant that results from industrial processes is formaldehyde. Recently, a company called BIP Ltd has been cultivating a pink-pigmented methylotroph, strain BIP, for the specific purpose of remediating formaldehyde-contaminated industrial wastes.

Since there are not a lot of published researches on M. flagellatus in particular, hence, there are not a lot of data available about this organism on the topic of application to biotechnology. We can still look at M. flagellatus’ close relatives, the methanotrophs, to help us better understand the genus Methylobacillus. Methanotrophs are a subset of a physiological group of methylotrophs, and its sole assimilatory/dissmilatory carbon source is methane. Methanotrophs also possess MMO, it is known that this enzyme has a broad substrate specificity and it can catalyzes the oxidation of a wide variety of water pollutants, such as trichloroethylene, vinyl chloride, and other halogenated hydrocarbons. MMO’s primary role is to convert methane to methanol, and any methyltrophs that can synthesize MMO are most likely classified as methanotrophs.

== Current research ==
=== Genomic analysis ===
M. flagellatus is closely related to members of the family Methylophilaceae. Most of its genes are dedicated to its methylotrophy functions (i.e.: breaking down one-carbon compounds), and these genes are present in more than one identical or non-identical copy. M. flagellatus is an obligate methylotroph; this is the direct consequence of an incomplete set of genes that cannot encode 3 critical enzymes (dehydrogenases) of the TCA cycle. Its genome does not code for any secondary metabolite synthesis pathways such as antibiotic biosynthesis, and no known xenobiotic degradation pathways are encoded. The absence of these self-defense mechanisms may help explain why M. flagellatus has no pathogenic qualities.

=== Population survey/detection methods ===
In June 2006 Kalyuzhaya et al. published a paper (“Fluorescence In Situ Hybridization-Flow Cytometry-Cell Sorting-Based Method for Separation and Enrichment of Type I and Type II Methanotroph Populations”) detailing more precise methods for separating organisms of interests within a natural sample. Their experiment focused on separating Type I and Type II Methanotrophs using combined techniques of FISH/FC (fluorescence in situ hybridization-flow cytometry) and FACS (fluorescence-activated FC analysis and cell sorting). FISH/FC employs oligonucleotide attached to florescein, or Alexa for targeting 16S rRNA. The fluoresced microbe can then be subjected to analysis and cell sorting. The detection phase involves putting the detected sample to “functional gene analysis to indicate specific separation using 16S rRNA, pmoA (encoding a subunit of particulate methane monooxygenase), and fae (encoding formaldehyde activating enzyme) genes.” The data indicate that FISH/FC/FACS is a method that can “provide significant enrichment of microbial populations of interest from complex natural communities.” Lastly, Kalyuzhaya et al. tested the reliability of whole genome amplification (WGA) using limited numbers of sorted cells. They found that WGA would give more “specific” results if a rough threshold number of 10^4 or more cells are in a sample. Having proven FISH/FC/FACS’ effectiveness to detect microbial populations, Kalyuzhay et al. used mixed samples of M. flagellatus along with other members of the methylotrophs genus to test their method's effectiveness.

=== Metabolism ===
In “Analysis of two formaldehyde oxidation pathways in Methylobacillus flagellatus KT strain, a ribulose monophosphate cycle methylotroph” Chistoserdova et al. studied different pathways of formaldehyde oxidation in M. flagellatus KT strain to asset the importance of these pathways relating to dissimilatory metabolism, and, or formaldehyde detoxification.

Based on null mutant experiments of 6-phosphogluconate dehydrogenase (Gnd) (a key enzyme of the cyclic oxidation pathway), and methenyl H4MPT cyclohydrolase (CH) (participating in the direct oxidation of formaldehyde via H4MPT derivatives), Chistoserdova et al. have found that Gnd null mutants were not obtained, but CH null mutants were obtained. The experimental result suggests “that this pathway [cyclic oxidation] is essential for growth on methylotrophic substrates”, and that linear oxidation of formaldehyde via H4MPT derivatives is not required for growth. More specifically, “results confirm previous suggestions that the cyclic formaldehyde oxidation pathway plays a crucial role in C1 metabolism of M. flagellatus KT strain, most probably as the major energy-generating pathway.”

Metabolic comparisons between M. flagellatus (beta-proteobacteria) and Methylobacterium extorquens (alpha-proteobacteria) indicated that these species utilize the linear oxidation pathway via H4MPT linked derivatives differently. M. flagellatus “mutants defective in this (linear oxidation) pathway were more sensitive to formaldehyde than wild-type for cells grown on solid media but not in shaken liquid cultures.” The result provided clues that this pathway may serve to protect the M. flagellatus from excess formaldehyde, whereas Methylobacterium extorquens uses this pathway as its “main energy-generating pathway for methylotrophic growth.”
