= Spirillum winogradskyi =

Scientific classification
- Domain: Bacteria
- Kingdom: Pseudomonadati
- Phylum: Pseudomonadota
- Class: Betaproteobacteria
- Order: Nitrosomonadales
- Family: Spirillaceae
- Genus: Spirillum
- Species: S. winogradskyi

Binomial name
- Spirillum winogradskyi Podkopaeva et al. 2009

Type strain
- D427, DSM 12756, VKM B-2518

Species of bacterium

Spirillum winogradskyi is a gram-negative, bacterium from the genus of Spirillum which was isolated from the sulfidic sludge of a municipal wastewater treatment plant.
