= Sutterella stercoricanis =

Scientific classification
- Domain: Bacteria
- Kingdom: Pseudomonadati
- Phylum: Pseudomonadota
- Class: Betaproteobacteria
- Order: Burkholderiales
- Family: Sutterellaceae
- Genus: Sutterella
- Species: S. stercoricanis

Binomial name
- Sutterella stercoricanis Greetham et al. 2004

Type strain
- 5BAC4, CCUG 47620, CIP 108024, DSM 17807

Species of bacterium

Sutterella stercoricanis is a Gram-negative, oxidase- and catalase-negative, anaerobic and microaerophilic, non-spore-forming, rod-shaped bacterium from the genus Sutterella in the family of Sutterellaceae, which was isolated from dog faeces.
