= Nitrosomonas halophila =

Scientific classification
- Domain: Bacteria
- Kingdom: Pseudomonadati
- Phylum: Pseudomonadota
- Class: Betaproteobacteria
- Order: Spirillales
- Family: Nitrosomonadaceae
- Genus: Nitrosomonas
- Species: N. halophila

Binomial name
- Nitrosomonas halophila Koops et al. 2001

Type strain
- Nm 1

Species of bacterium

Nitrosomonas halophila is an ammonia-oxidizing, aerobe, Gram-negative bacterium from the genus of Nitrosomonas. Nitrosomonas halophila uses the enzyme Ammonia monooxygenase.
