= Nitrosomonas aestuarii =

Scientific classification
- Domain: Bacteria
- Kingdom: Pseudomonadati
- Phylum: Pseudomonadota
- Class: Betaproteobacteria
- Order: Spirillales
- Family: Nitrosomonadaceae
- Genus: Nitrosomonas
- Species: N. aestuarii

Binomial name
- Nitrosomonas aestuarii Koops et al. 2001

Type strain
- Nm 36

Species of bacterium

Nitrosomonas aestuarii is a gram-negative, aerobe, bacterium from the genus of Nitrosomonas which metabolize ammonia to nitrite for its source of energy.
