= Nitrosomonas europaea =

Scientific classification
- Domain: Bacteria
- Kingdom: Pseudomonadati
- Phylum: Pseudomonadota
- Class: Betaproteobacteria
- Order: Spirillales
- Family: Nitrosomonadaceae
- Genus: Nitrosomonas
- Species: N. europaea

Binomial name
- Nitrosomonas europaea Winogradsky 1892

Synonyms
- Pseudomonas europaea (Winogradsky 1892) Migula 1895; Bacterium nitrosomonas Lehmann and Neumann 1899; Planococcus europaeus (Winogradsky 1892) Vuillemin 1913

Species of bacterium

Nitrosomonas europaea is a Gram-negative obligate chemolithoautotroph that can derive all its energy and reductant for growth from the oxidation of ammonia to nitrite and lives in several places such as soil, sewage, freshwater, the walls of buildings and on the surface of monuments especially in polluted areas where the air contains high levels of nitrogen compounds.

Due to the large amounts of ammonia this bacterium needs to consume for energy to divide, cell division can take up to several days. This is perhaps one reason why this microbe is not studied very much. This microbe has been shown to be an ammonia-oxidizing soil bacterium and it is known to have a range of substrates that might be useful in bioremediation. Several studies are still being done with the bacterium, but will take some time due to the slow cell division rate and the high amounts of nitrogen needed to live.

While not using photosynthesis for energy is not unique, "burning" ammonia with oxygen is. Both are characteristics of Nitrosomonas europaea. This microbe tolerates a pH of 6.0-9.0, the optimal conditions being slightly basic; has an aerobic metabolism; and prefers a temperature between 20-30 degrees Celsius. Most are mobile with flagella located in the polar regions although some species are nonmobile.

The reaction catalysed by these bacteria is the first step in the oxidation of ammonia to nitrate. Nitrosomonas europaea are also important in the treatment of industrial and sewage waste in the first step of oxidizing ammonia to nitrate. Evidence suggests that ammonia-oxidizing bacteria (AOB) contribute significantly to the global production of nitrous oxide (produced by the reduction of nitrite). Other evidence reveals that AOB are a possible source of nitric oxide via the oxidation of ammonia. Nitrosomonas europaea is also capable of degrading benzene as well as a variety of halogenated organic compounds, including trichloroethylene and vinyl chloride. The ability of nitrifying organisms to degrade some pollutants may make these organisms attractive for controlled bioremediation in nitrifying soils and waters.

Nitrosomonas europaea is also accountable for nitric acid production which can cause the dissolution of some stone and other construction materials found on statues and in buildings.
