= Nitrosomonas communis =

Scientific classification
- Domain: Bacteria
- Kingdom: Pseudomonadati
- Phylum: Pseudomonadota
- Class: Betaproteobacteria
- Order: Spirillales
- Family: Nitrosomonadaceae
- Genus: Nitrosomonas
- Species: N. communis

Binomial name
- Nitrosomonas communis Koops et al. 2001

Type strain
- Nm 2

Species of bacterium

Nitrosomonas communis is an ammonia-oxidizing, gram-negative, bacterium from the genus of Nitrosomonas which was isolated from the rhizoplane of the reed (Phragmites communis) from a wastewater treatment plant.
