= Methylobacillus rhizosphaerae =

Scientific classification
- Domain: Bacteria
- Kingdom: Pseudomonadati
- Phylum: Pseudomonadota
- Class: Betaproteobacteria
- Order: Methylophilaceae
- Genus: Methylobacillus
- Species: M. rhizosphaerae

Binomial name
- Methylobacillus rhizosphaerae Madhaiyan et al. 2016

Type strain
- KCTC 22383, Ca-68, NCIMB 14472

Species of bacterium

Methylobacillus rhizosphaerae is a Gram-negative, methylotrophic, strictly aerobic and motile bacterium from the genus of Methylobacillus which has been isolated from rhizospheric soil from a field with red pepper in India.
