= Sutterella parvirubra =

Scientific classification
- Domain: Bacteria
- Kingdom: Pseudomonadati
- Phylum: Pseudomonadota
- Class: Betaproteobacteria
- Order: Burkholderiales
- Family: Sutterellaceae
- Genus: Sutterella
- Species: S. parvirubra

Binomial name
- Sutterella parvirubra Sakon et al. 2008

Type strain
- DSM 19354, JCM 14724, YIT 11816

Species of bacterium

Sutterella parvirubra is a Gram-negative, oxidase- and catalase-negative, anaerobic, non-spore-forming, nonmotile bacterium from the genus Sutterella in the family Sutterellaceae, which was isolated from human faeces.
