= Nitrosomonas oligotropha =

Scientific classification
- Domain: Bacteria
- Kingdom: Pseudomonadati
- Phylum: Pseudomonadota
- Class: Betaproteobacteria
- Order: Spirillales
- Family: Nitrosomonadaceae
- Genus: Nitrosomonas
- Species: N. oligotropha

Binomial name
- Nitrosomonas oligotropha Koops et al. 2001

Type strain
- Nm 45

Species of bacterium

Nitrosomonas oligotropha is an ammonia-oxidizing, aerobe, gram-negative bacterium from the genus of Nitrosomonas which occurs in chloraminated drinking water systems.
