= Methylobacillus pratensis =

Scientific classification
- Domain: Bacteria
- Kingdom: Pseudomonadati
- Phylum: Pseudomonadota
- Class: Betaproteobacteria
- Order: Methylophilaceae
- Genus: Methylobacillus
- Species: M. pratensis

Binomial name
- Methylobacillus pratensis Doronina et al. 2004

Species of bacterium

Methylobacillus pratensis is a Gram-negative methylotrophic bacteria with was isolated from a meadow grass sampled from the city park in Helsinki. The phylogenetic and genotypic analysis shows that Methylobacillus pratensis is a novel species of the genus Methylobacillus.
