= Nitrosomonas marina =

Scientific classification
- Domain: Bacteria
- Kingdom: Pseudomonadati
- Phylum: Pseudomonadota
- Class: Betaproteobacteria
- Order: Spirillales
- Family: Nitrosomonadaceae
- Genus: Nitrosomonas
- Species: N. marina

Binomial name
- Nitrosomonas marina Koops et al. 2001

Type strain
- Nm 22

Species of bacterium

Nitrosomonas marina is an ammonia-oxidizing, aerobe, gram-negative bacterium from the genus of Nitrosomonas.
