= Nitrosomonas stercoris =

Scientific classification
- Domain: Bacteria
- Kingdom: Pseudomonadati
- Phylum: Pseudomonadota
- Class: Betaproteobacteria
- Order: Spirillales
- Family: Nitrosomonadaceae
- Genus: Nitrosomonas
- Species: N. stercoris

Binomial name
- Nitrosomonas stercoris Nakagawa and Takahashi 2017

Type strain
- ATCC BAA-2718, NBRC 110753, KYUHI-S

Species of bacterium

Nitrosomonas stercoris is an ammonia-oxidizing bacterium from the genus Nitrosomonas.
