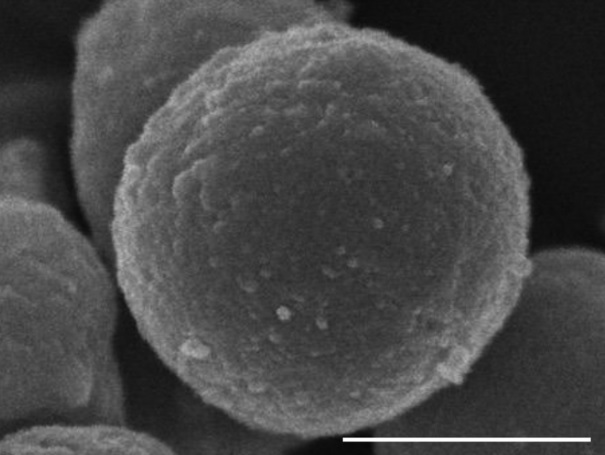
- Sutterella megalosphaeroides

Scientific classification
- Domain: Bacteria
- Kingdom: Pseudomonadati
- Phylum: Pseudomonadota
- Class: Betaproteobacteria
- Order: Burkholderiales
- Family: Sutterellaceae
- Genus: Sutterella; Wexler et al. 1996

Type species
- Sutterella wadsworthensis

Species
- Sutterella megalosphaeroides Sutterella parvirubra Sutterella stercoricanis Sutterella wadsworthensis

= Sutterella =

Genus of bacteria

Sutterella is a genus of Gram-negative, rod-shaped, non-spore-forming, Betaproteobacteria whose species have been isolated from the human gastrointestinal tract as well as canine feces. This genus of the family Sutterellaceae currently encompasses 4 distinct species, though at least 5 additional species have been proposed that do not yet meet International Code of Nomenclature of Prokaryotes (ICNP) standards for classification. Sutterella are frequently referred to as commensal in the context of human hosts, but are associated with inflammation, which has implications for a number of diseases.

== Characteristics ==
Sutterella cells are 0.5 to 1 μm wide and 1 to 3 μm long. They exhibit bile resistance, are nitrate reducers, do not hydrolyze urea, and do not possess the cytochrome c oxidase enzyme. They are only able to be cultured in microaerophilic and anaerobic environments. The Sutterella genome encodes the sulfite reductase MccA.

== Human health ==
Imbalances in abundance of Sutterella species is correlated with a number of disordered health outcomes. Many of these are related to gut health though others are developmental and neurological disorders. Sutterella abundance has been positively correlated with irritable bowel disease, Crohn's disease, and autism spectrum disorder. Some studies have shown correlation between Sutterella abundance and severity of down syndrome, though not the onset of the syndrome itself. There is also some evidence to suggest that Sutterella may be implicated in the pathogensis of ulcerative colitis. However, Sutterella abundance is negatively associated with other disorders, such as multiple sclerosis.

Sutterella has been found to be mildly pro-inflammatory and some research suggests this is due to an ability to degrade IgA. This may help explain its role in human health.

There have been a number of studies indicating that diet has an effect on Sutterella abundance in the gut. Prebiotics, including artificial sweeteners, pectic polysaccharides, and dietary fiber, have been shown to alter the abundance of Sutterella species.

== History of classification ==
Sutterella was initially characterized by Wexler et al. in 1996. Despite being mistaken for Campylobacter gracilis, it was later determined that it had a number of distinguishing features; sequencing confirmed that it was a unique species most closely related to members of the order Burkholderiales and other Betaproteobacteria. This original strain was named Sutterella wadsworthensis, chosen to honor both the laboratory where it was discovered, the Wadsworth Anaerobe Laboratory, and its decades long director, Vera Sutter.

In 2010, upon the discovery of the second species of Parasutterella, Parasutterella secunda, Morotomi et al. proposed the reclassification of the closely related Sutterella and Parasutterella genera from Alcaligenaceae to a new and distinct family they named Sutterellaceae.

== Species ==
=== Recognized species ===
Sutterella megalosphaeroides

Sutterella parvirubra

Sutterella stercoricanis

Sutterella wadsworthensis

=== Proposed species ===
Sutterella faecalis

Sutterella massiliensis

Candidatus Sutterella merdavium

Sutterella seckii

Sutterella timonensis
