= Parasutterella excrementihominis =

Scientific classification
- Domain: Bacteria
- Kingdom: Pseudomonadati
- Phylum: Pseudomonadota
- Class: Betaproteobacteria
- Order: Burkholderiales
- Family: Sutterellaceae
- Genus: Parasutterella
- Species: P. excrementihominis

Binomial name
- Parasutterella excrementihominis Nagai et al. 2009

Type strain
- DSM 21040, JCM 15078, YIT 11859

Species of bacterium

Parasutterella excrementihominis is a Gram-negative, strictly anaerobic, non-spore-forming bacterium of the genus Parasutterella in the family Sutterellaceae, isolated from human faeces.
