= Methylobacillus glycogenes =

Scientific classification
- Domain: Bacteria
- Kingdom: Pseudomonadati
- Phylum: Pseudomonadota
- Class: Betaproteobacteria
- Order: Methylophilaceae
- Genus: Methylobacillus
- Species: M. glycogenes

Binomial name
- Methylobacillus glycogenes Yordy and Weaver 1977

Type strain
- ATCC 29475; DSM 46232; DSM 5685; JCM 2850; LMG 6082; NCIB 11375; NCIMB 11375; TK 0113; VKM B -2060

Synonyms
- Pseudomonas insueta Shiio et al. 1971; Pseudomonas methanolicola Terui et al. 1970; Pseudomonas methylotropha Byrom and Ousby 1975

Species of bacterium

Methylobacillus glycogenes is a Gram-negative methylotrophic bacteria that can only grow on methanol or methylamine, but under nitrogen-limiting conditions synthesizes glycogen as an internal reserve material.
