= Nitrosomonas eutropha =

Scientific classification
- Domain: Bacteria
- Kingdom: Pseudomonadati
- Phylum: Pseudomonadota
- Class: Betaproteobacteria
- Order: Spirillales
- Family: Nitrosomonadaceae
- Genus: Nitrosomonas
- Species: N. eutropha

Binomial name
- Nitrosomonas eutropha Koops et al. 2001

Type strain
- Nm 57

Species of bacterium

Nitrosomonas eutropha is an ammonia-oxidizing, Gram-negative bacterium from the genus of Nitrosomonas.

Starting in 2014, it was being tested by the biotech company AOBiome for its possible health benefits on skin. AOBiome started a Phase II trial of an intranasal formulation of the bacteria for migraines.
