= Sutterella wadsworthensis =

Scientific classification
- Domain: Bacteria
- Kingdom: Pseudomonadati
- Phylum: Pseudomonadota
- Class: Betaproteobacteria
- Order: Burkholderiales
- Family: Sutterellaceae
- Genus: Sutterella
- Species: S. wadsworthensis

Binomial name
- Sutterella wadsworthensis Wexler et al. 1996

Type strain
- ATCC 51579, CCUG 42229, CIP 104799, DSM 14016, WAL 9799

Synonyms
- Sutterella wadsworthia

Species of bacterium

Sutterella wadsworthensis is a gram-negative bacterium from the genus Sutterella in the family Sutterellaceae.
