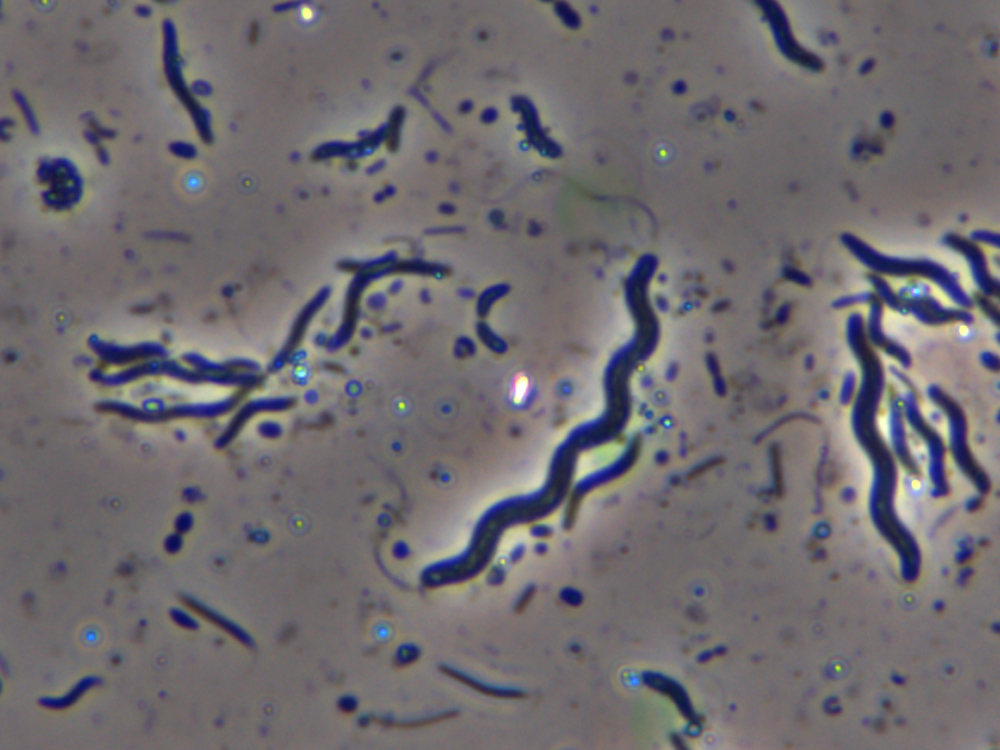
- Spirillum

Scientific classification
- Domain: Bacteria
- Kingdom: Pseudomonadati
- Phylum: Pseudomonadota
- Class: Betaproteobacteria
- Order: Nitrosomonadales
- Family: Spirillaceae
- Genus: Spirillum; Ehrenberg, 1832 emend. Podkopaeva et al., 2009

Species
- Spirillum winogradskyi; Spirillum volutans

= Spirillum =

Genus of bacteria

Spirillum is a genus of Gram-negative bacteria in the family Spirillaceae of the Nitrosomonadales of the Betaproteobacteria. There are two species of Spirillum with validly or effectively published names - Spirillum winogradskyi and Spirillum volutans.

Other "species" classified as Spirillum such as "Spirillum minus", "Spirillum pleomorphum", and "Spirillum pulli" are of uncertain phylogeny and in any case, these are names that have never been validly or effectively published and thus have no standing in nomenclature.

== Morphology ==
Members of the genus Spirillum are large, elongate, spiral shaped, rigid cells. Some have tufts of amphitrichous flagella at both poles. They are microaerophilic and usually found in stagnant freshwater rich in organic matter.
