= Ureae =

Ureae may refer to:

- Nitrosomonas ureae, species of bacteria
- Sporosarcina ureae, species of bacteria
