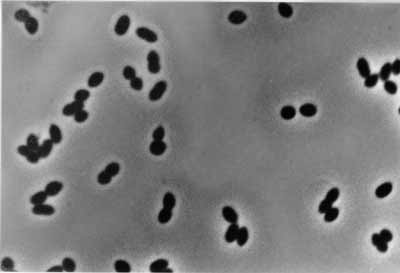
- N. eutropha

Scientific classification
- Domain: Bacteria
- Kingdom: Pseudomonadati
- Phylum: Pseudomonadota
- Class: Betaproteobacteria
- Order: Spirillales
- Family: Nitrosomonadaceae
- Genus: Nitrosomonas; Winogradsky, 1892

Type species
- Nitrosomonas europaea

Species
- "Nitrosomonas aestuarii" Koops et al. 1991; "Nitrosomonas communis" Koops et al. 1991; "Nitrosomonas cryotolerans" Jones et al. 1988; Nitrosomonas europaea Winogradsky 1892; "Nitrosomonas eutropha" Koops et al. 1991; "Nitrosomonas halophila" Koops et al. 1991; "Nitrosomonas javanensis" Winogradsky 1892; "Nitrosomonas marina" Koops et al. 1991; "Nitrosomonas mobilis" Garrity et al. 2003; "Nitrosomonas nitrosa" Koops et al. 1991; "Nitrosomonas oligotropha" Koops et al. 1991; Nitrosomonas stercoris Nakagawa and Takahashi 2017; Nitrosomonas supralitoralis Urakawa et al. 2023; "Nitrosomonas ureae" Koops et al. 1991

= Nitrosomonas =

Genus of bacteria

Nitrosomonas is a genus of Gram-negative bacteria belonging to the class Betaproteobacteria. It is one of the five genera of ammonia-oxidizing bacteria and, as an obligate chemolithoautotroph, uses ammonia (NH_{3}) as an energy source and carbon dioxide (CO_{2}) as a carbon source in the presence of oxygen.

Nitrosomonas species are important in the global biogeochemical nitrogen cycle because they increase the bioavailability of nitrogen to plants and play a role in denitrification, a process important for the release of nitrous oxide, a powerful greenhouse gas. These microbes are photophobic and usually generate a biofilm matrix, or form clumps with other microbes, to avoid light. Nitrosomonas can be divided into six lineages:

- The first includes Nitrosomonas europaea, Nitrosomonas eutropha, Nitrosomonas halophila, and Nitrosomonas mobilis.
- The second presents Nitrosomonas communis, N. sp. I, and N. sp. II.
- The third includes only Nitrosomonas nitrosa.
- The fourth includes Nitrosomonas ureae and Nitrosomonas oligotropha.
- The fifth and sixth lineages include Nitrosomonas marina, N. sp. III, Nitrosomonas aestuarii, and Nitrosomonas cryotolerans.

== Morphology ==
All species included in this genus have ellipsoidal or rod-shaped cells, which have extensive intracytoplasmic membranes displayed as flattened vesicles.

Most species are motile, possessing a flagellum located in the polar region of the cell. Three basic morphological types of Nitrosomonas have been observed: short rods, rods, and cells with pointed ends. Nitrosomonas species have distinct characteristics regarding size and shape:

- N. europaea cells appear as short rods with pointed ends, measuring 0.8–1.1 x 1.0–1.7 μm; motility has not been observed.
- N. eutropha cells present as rod to pear-shaped cells with one or both ends pointed, measuring 1.0–1.3 x 1.6–2.3 μm. They show motility.
- N. halophila cells have a coccoid shape, measuring 1.1–1.5 x 1.5–2.2 μm. Motility is possible due to a tuft of flagella.
- N. communis cells are large rods with rounded ends, measuring 1.0–1.4 x 1.7–2.2 μm. Motility has not been observed in this species.
- N. nitrosa, N. oligotropha, and N. ureae cells are spheres or rods with rounded ends. Motility has not been observed in these species.
- N. marina presents slender rod cells with rounded ends, measuring 0.7–0.9 x 1.7–2.2 μm.
- N. aestuarii and N. cryotolerans present as rod-shaped cells.

== Genome ==
Genome sequencing of Nitrosomonas species is important for understanding the ecological role of these bacteria.

Among the various species of Nitrosomonas known today, the complete genomes of N. ureae strain Nm10, N. europaea, and Nitrosomonas sp. Is79 have been sequenced.

=== Ammonia-oxidation genes ===
The presence of genes for ammonia oxidation characterizes all these species. The first enzyme involved in the ammonia oxidation process is ammonia monooxygenase (AMO), which is encoded by the amoCAB operon. The AMO enzyme catalyzes the oxidation of NH_{3} (ammonia) to NH_{2}OH (hydroxylamine). The amoCAB operon contains three different genes: amoA, amoB, and amoC. While N. europaea possesses two copies of these genes, N. sp. Is79 and N. ureae strain Nm10 have three copies.

The second enzyme involved in the process of ammonia oxidation is hydroxylamine oxidoreductase (HAO), encoded by the hao operon. This enzyme catalyzes the oxidation of NH_{2}OH to NO, a highly reactive radical intermediate that can be partitioned into the main products of the ammonia oxidation process: N_{2}O, a potent greenhouse gas, and NO_{2}^{-}, a form of nitrogen more bioavailable for crops, but which conversely washes away from fields faster. The hao operon contains different genes such as haoA, which encodes for the functional cytochrome c subunit; cycA, which encodes for cytochrome c554; and cycB, which encodes for quinone reductase. These genes are present in different numbers of copies in various species; for instance, in Nitrosomonas sp. Is79 there are only three copies, while in N. ureae there are four.

=== Denitrification genes ===
The discovery of genes that encode for enzymes involved in the denitrification process includes the first gene, nirK, which encodes for a nitrite reductase with copper. This enzyme catalyzes the reduction from NO_{2}^{-} (nitrite) to NO (nitric oxide). While in N. europaea, N. eutropha, and N. cryotolerans, nirK is included in a multigenetic cluster, in Nitrosomonas sp. Is79 and N. sp. AL212, it is present as a single gene. A high expression of the nirK gene was found in N. ureae, and this has been explained with the hypothesis that the NirK enzyme is also involved in the oxidation of NH_{2}OH in this species. The second gene involved in denitrification is norCBQD, which encodes a nitric-oxide reductase that catalyzes the reduction from NO (nitric oxide) to N_{2}O (nitrous oxide). These genes are present in N. sp. AL212, N. cryotolerans, and N. communis strain Nm2. In Nitrosomonas europaea, these genes are included in a cluster. These genes are absent in N. sp. Is79 and N. ureae. Recently, it was found that the norSY gene encodes for a nitric-oxide reductase with copper in N. communis strain Nm2 and Nitrosomonas sp. AL212.

=== Carbon fixation genes ===
Nitrosomonas species use the Calvin-Benson cycle as a pathway for carbon fixation. For this reason, all species possess an operon that encodes the RuBisCO enzyme. In Nitrosomonas sp. Is79, a peculiarity is found where two copies of the operon encode two different forms of the RuBisCO enzyme: the IA form and the IC form. The IA form has a greater affinity for carbon dioxide. Other species possess different copies of this operon that encode only the IA form. In N. europaea, the operon is characterized by five genes (ccbL, ccbS, ccbQ, ccbO, and ccbN) that encode the RuBisCO enzyme. ccbL encodes the major subunit while ccbS encodes the minor subunit; these genes are also the most expressed within the operon. The ccbQ and ccbO genes encode a number of proteins involved in the processing, folding, assembling, activation, and regulation of the RuBisCO enzyme. ccbN encodes a protein of 101 amino acids, whose function is currently unknown. A putative regulatory gene, cbbR, was found 194 bases upstream of the start codon of cbbL and is transcribed in the opposite direction to the other genes.

=== Transporter genes ===
Since Nitrosomonas species are ammonia-oxidizing bacteria (AOB), ammonia carriers are essential. Bacteria adapted to high concentrations of ammonia can absorb it passively by simple diffusion. N. eutropha, which is adapted to high levels of ammonia, does not possess genes encoding an ammonia transporter. Bacteria adapted to low concentrations of ammonia possess a transporter (transmembrane protein) for this substrate. In Nitrosomonas, two different ammonia carriers have been identified, differing in structure and function. The first is the Amt protein (AmtB type), encoded by amt genes, found in Nitrosomonas sp. Is79. The activity of this ammonia carrier depends on the membrane potential. The second was found in N. europaea, in which the rh1 gene encodes an Rh-type ammonia carrier. Its activity is independent of the membrane potential. Recent research has also linked the Rh transmembrane proteins with CO_{2} transport, but this mechanism is not yet fully understood.

== Metabolism ==
Nitrosomonas is one of the genera included in AOB; species use ammonia as an energy source and carbon dioxide as the main source of carbon. The oxidation of ammonia is a rate-limiting step in nitrification and plays a fundamental role in the nitrogen cycle because it transforms ammonia, which is usually extremely volatile, into less volatile forms of nitrogen.

=== Ammonia oxidation ===
Nitrosomonas oxidizes ammonia into nitrite in a metabolic process known as nitritation (a step of nitrification). This process occurs with the accompanying reduction of an oxygen molecule to water (which requires four electrons) and the release of energy. The oxidation of ammonia to hydroxylamine is catalyzed by ammonia monooxygenase (AMO), a membrane-bound, multisubstrate enzyme. In this reaction, two electrons are required to reduce an oxygen atom to water:

NH_{3} + O_{2} + 2 H^{+} + 2 e^{–} → NH_{2}OH + H_{2}O

Since an ammonia molecule releases only two electrons when oxidized, it is hypothesized that the other two necessary electrons come from the oxidation of hydroxylamine to nitrite, which occurs in the periplasm and is catalyzed by hydroxylamine oxidoreductase (HAO), a periplasm-associated enzyme.

NH_{2}OH + H_{2}O → NO_{2}^{–} + 5 H^{+} + 4 e^{–}

Two of the four electrons released by the reaction return to the AMO to convert the ammonia to hydroxylamine. 1.65 of the two remaining electrons are available for the assimilation of nutrients and the generation of the proton gradient. They pass through cytochrome c552 to cytochrome caa3, then to O_{2}, which is the terminal acceptor; here they are reduced to form water. The remaining 0.35 electrons are used to reduce NAD+ to NADH to generate the proton gradient.

Nitrite is the major nitrogen oxide produced in the process; however, when oxygen concentrations are low, nitrous oxide and nitric oxide can also form as by-products from the oxidation of hydroxylamine to nitrite.

N. europaea has been identified as capable of degrading a variety of halogenated compounds, including trichloroethylene, benzene, and vinyl chloride.

== Ecology ==
=== Habitat ===
Nitrosomonas species are generally found in the highest numbers in habitats with an abundance of ammonia (examples include environments with plentiful protein decomposition and in wastewater treatment) and thrive in a pH range of 6.0–9.0 and a temperature range of 20–30 °C (68–86 °F). Some species can live and proliferate on the surface of monuments or on the walls of stone buildings, contributing to the erosion of those surfaces.

Nitrosomonas bacteria are globally distributed in both eutrophic and oligotrophic freshwater and saltwater. They are especially prevalent in shallow coastal sediments and in upwelling zones, such as the Peruvian coast and the Arabian Sea, but can also be found in fertilized soils.

Some Nitrosomonas species, such as N. europaea, possess the enzyme urease (which catalyzes the conversion of urea into ammonia and carbon dioxide) and have been shown to assimilate the carbon dioxide released by the reaction to make biomass via the Calvin cycle. They harvest energy by oxidizing ammonia (the other product of urease) to nitrite. This feature may explain enhanced growth of AOB in the presence of urea in acidic environments.

=== Leaching of soil ===
In agriculture, nitrification by Nitrosomonas is problematic because the oxidized nitrite from ammonia can persist in the soil, leading to leaching and reduced availability for plants.

Nitrification can be slowed by inhibitors that retard the oxidation of ammonia to nitrites by inhibiting the activity of Nitrosomonas and other ammonia-oxidizing bacteria, thereby minimizing or preventing the loss of nitrate.

=== Application ===
Nitrosomonas is used in activated sludge in aerobic wastewater treatment; nitrification treatment reduces nitrogen compounds in the water, avoiding environmental issues such as ammonia toxicity and groundwater contamination. Nitrogen, if present in high quantities, can cause algal development, leading to eutrophication and degradation of oceans and lakes.

As a method of wastewater treatment, biological removal of nitrogen is cheaper and causes less environmental damage than physical-chemical treatments.

Nitrosomonas also plays a role in biofilter systems, typically in association with other microbes, to consume compounds such as NH_{4}^{+} or CO_{2} and recycle nutrients. These systems are used for various purposes, but mainly for odor elimination in waste treatment.

== Other uses ==
=== Potential cosmetic benefits ===
N. europaea is a non-pathogenic bacterium studied in connection with probiotic therapies. In this context, it may provide aesthetic benefits by reducing the appearance of wrinkles. The effectiveness of probiotic products has been studied to explore why N. eutropha, a highly mobile bacterium, has become extinct from the normal flora of human skin. Studies have investigated the potential benefits of repopulating human skin flora with N. eutropha.

== See also ==
- Nitrate
- Nitrite
- Nitrobacter
- Nitrobacteraceae
- Nitrogen cycle
- Nitrospira
- Nitrospirota
