= Lake Chillisquaque =

Lake and reservoir in Montour County, Pennsylvania

- Montour Lake
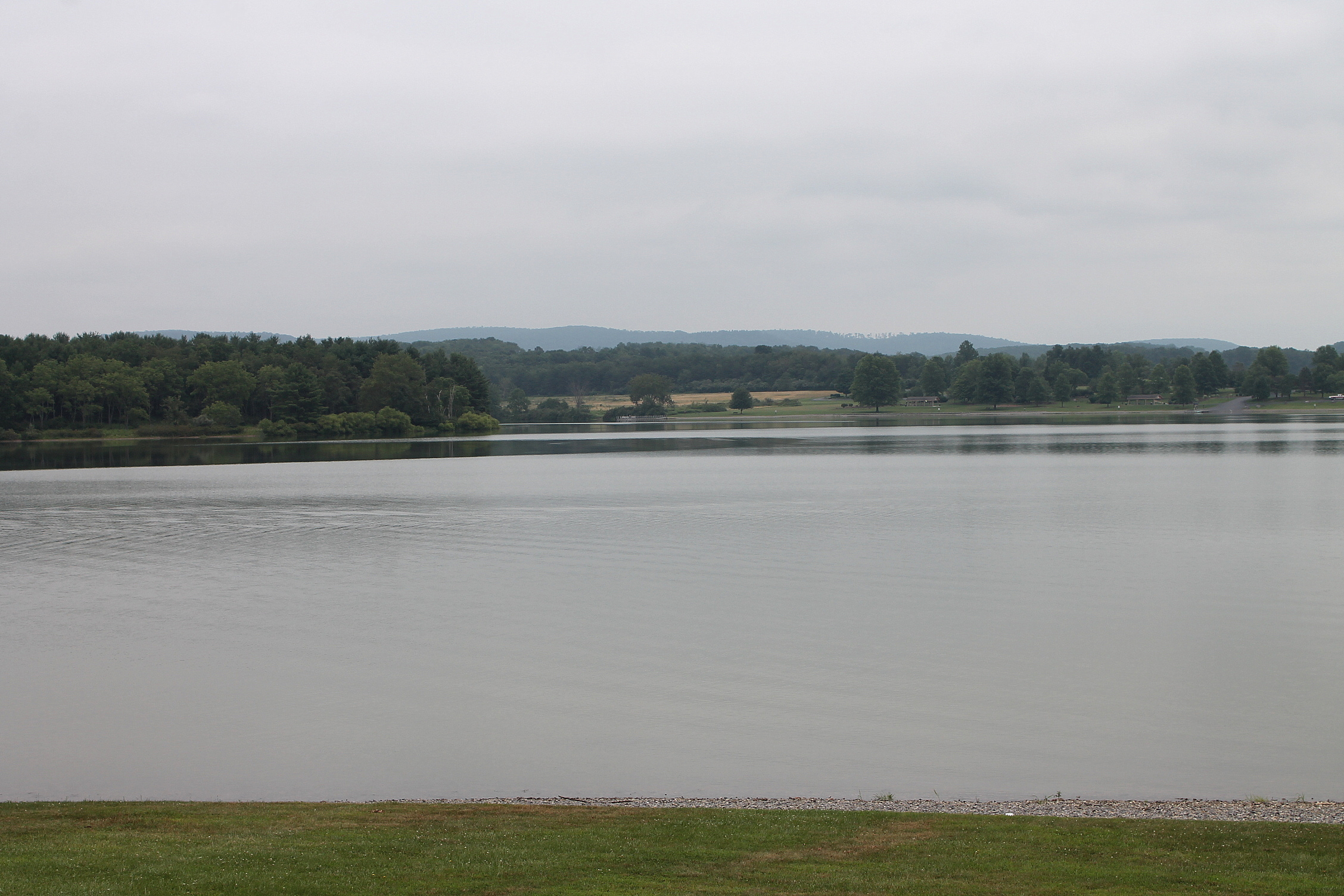
- Lake Chillisquaque from the west in July

- Location within Pennsylvania Location within the United States
- Location: Anthony Township, Montour County, Pennsylvania
- Coordinates: 41.105°N 76.660°W
- Type: Reservoir
- Etymology: Middle Branch Chillisquaque Creek
- Primary inflows: primarily Middle Branch Chillisquaque Creek
- Primary outflows: Middle Branch Chillisquaque Creek
- Managing agency: PPL
- Built: 1972
- Surface area: 165 acres (67 ha)
- Max. depth: 40 feet (12 m)
- Shore length^{1}: approximately 4.0 miles (6.4 km)
- Surface elevation: 567 feet (173 m)
- ^{1} Shore length is not a well-defined measure.

Lake Chillisquaque (also known as Montour Lake) is a lake and reservoir in Montour County, Pennsylvania, in the United States. It has a surface area of 165 acres. The lake is situated on Middle Branch Chillisquaque Creek, which it is named after. Nearby communities include Danville and Washingtonville. The lake has an elevation of 567 feet (173 m) above sea level and is up to 40 feet (12 m) deep. It has several coves, including Goose Cove, Heron Cove, and Jellyfish Cove. The lake is dammed on its southern side by the Lake Chillisquaque Dam, which is 2,000 feet (610 m) long and 54 feet (16 m) high. The metals with the highest concentrations are calcium and iron. Nonmetals such as nitrogen and phosphorus are also found in the lake. It experiences agricultural runoff as well.

Lake Chillisquaque is owned by Pennsylvania energy company Talen. It was constructed in 1972 and was originally created to serve as a supply of cooling water for the Montour Power Plant (a purpose which it still serves), but has also come to be used for recreational purposes. Approximately 200 bird species have been observed on or near the lake and more than 50 species of waterfowl pass by the lake during migration. It is also inhabited by numerous species of fish, some of which are stocked by the Pennsylvania Fish and Boat Commission. Various trees, shrubs, and herbaceous plants live in the vicinity of the lake as well. The main recreational activities on or near Lake Chillisquaque include fishing, boating, and hiking. The lake is also surrounded by the Montour Preserve, a nature preserve.

== Geography ==
Lake Chillisquaque is located on Middle Branch Chillisquaque Creek, in Anthony Township. However, other streams feed into the lake as well. It is 11 miles (18 km) north of Danville and 4 miles (6.4 km) north of Washingtonville. The lake can be accessed via Pennsylvania Route 44 and Pennsylvania Route 54. The nearest road is Preserve Road/State Route 1006. The lake has an elevation of 567 feet (173 m). With a surface area of 165 acres, the lake is the largest of 82 bodies of water in Montour County. Lake Chillisquaque is the only reservoir in Montour County. Lake Chillisquaque is surrounded by forested hills and agricultural land. The Muncy Hills are situated to the north of the lake.

Large parts of Lake Chillisquaque are fairly shallow. Most of Heron Cove is less than 10 feet (3.0 m) deep and a large area near the lake's boat ramp is approximately 20 feet (6.1 m) deep. The deepest parts of the lake, near the lake's dam, are 40 feet (12 m) deep. Lake Chillisquaque has a number of coves, including Heron Cove and the nearby Jellyfish Cove. Goose Cove is another cove on the lake. It is located in the lake's northwestern section. There are numerous other smaller coves and bays. Numerous objects, including tire reefs and cement blocks, have been placed in Lake Chillisquaque to increase its suitability as a fish habitat. There are also basking platforms for turtles on the lake.

=== Dam ===
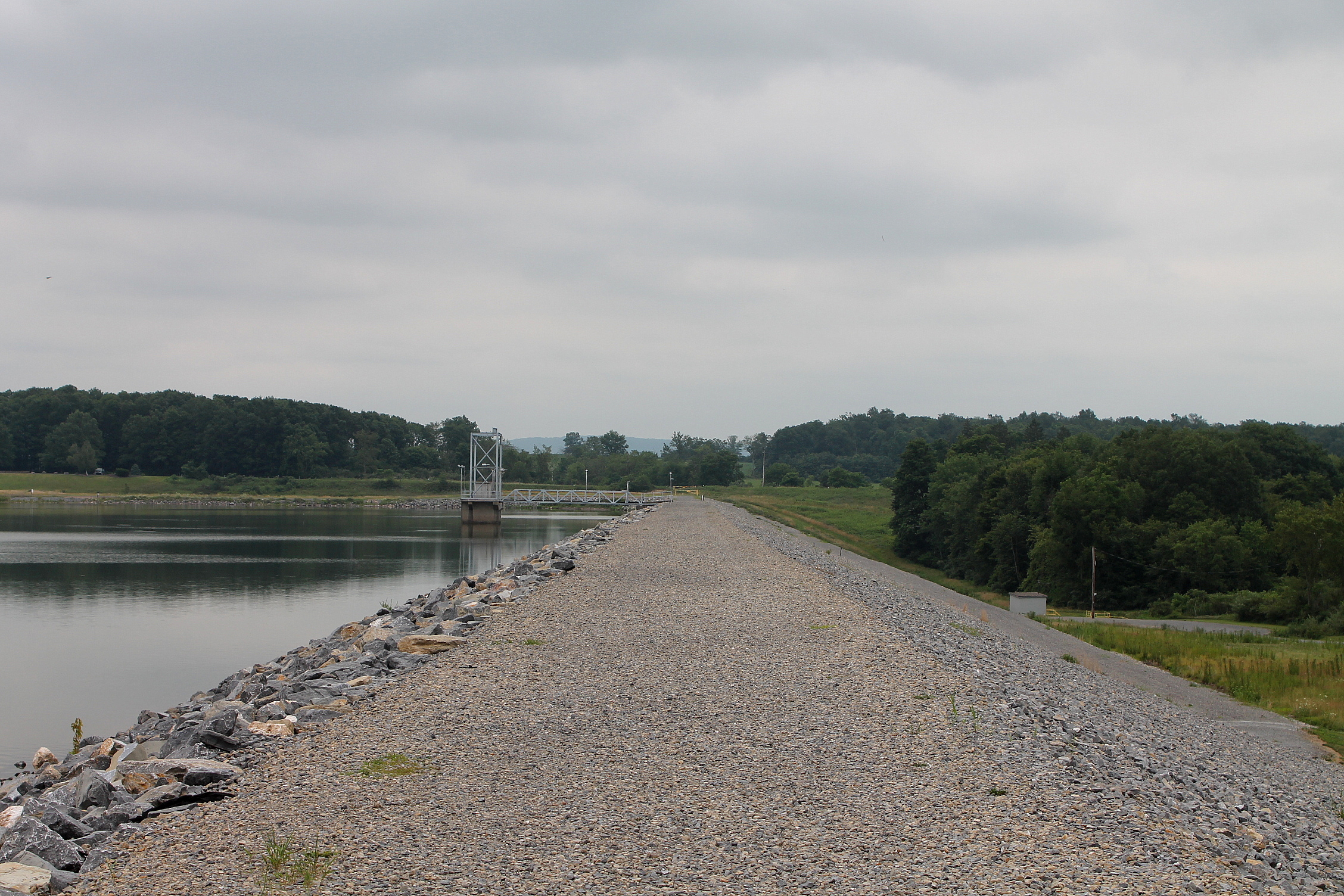
The top of the dam on Lake Chillisquaque

Lake Chillisquaque is dammed by an earth-fill dam known as the Lake Chillisquaque Dam. Located on the southern side of the lake, the dam is 2,000 feet (610 m) long and 54 feet (16 m) high. The dam is 12 feet (3.7 m) wide at its highest point and the top of the dam forms an access road. The inner part of the dam is a silty clay material, while the outside is made of weathered shale.

According to the Montour County Multi-jurisdictional Hazard Mitigation Plan, a major failure in the Lake Chillisquaque Dam could cause damage to several nearby communities, such as Strawberry Ridge and Washingtonville. It could also result in a decrease in the output of the Montour Power Plant, causing a brownout in the area. A severe failure of the dam is considered by the Multi-jurisdictional Hazard Mitigation Plan to be the most dangerous threat to Montour County.

== Hydrology ==
The water temperature of Lake Chillisquaque ranges from 10.4 °C (50.7 °F) to 28.7 °C (83.7 °F) in the summer. The specific conductance of the lake ranges from 135 to 202 micro-siemens per centimeter. The lake's pH is between 6.6 and 9.3. It is a dimictic lake. The concentration of suspended solids in Lake Chillisquaque ranges from less than 2 to 58 milligrams per liter. The concentration of water hardness is between 54 and 78 milligrams per liter. It experiences agricultural runoff due to the presence of large tracts of agricultural land near the lake.

The concentration of hydrogen ions in the waters of Lake Chillisquaque ranges from 0.00011 to 0.00031 milligrams per liter. The concentration of dissolved oxygen ranges from 0.1 to 10.8 milligrams per liter and the concentration of carbon dioxide in the lake is between 0.1 and 41 milligrams per liter. There are between 3.0 and 5.8 milligrams per liter of organic carbon in the lake. The total concentration of nitrogen in the lake's waters ranges from 0.34 to 3.1 milligrams per liter, while the concentration of ammonia ranges from less than 0.026 to 3.21 milligrams per liter. The phosphorus concentration ranges from 0.015 to 0.172 milligrams per liter. The waters of Lake Chillisquaque also contain varying amounts of metals. These include calcium, whose concentration ranges from 15.6 to 20.9 milligrams per liter and magnesium, whose concentration ranges from 3.7 to 6.2 milligrams per liter. Additionally, the concentration of copper is less than four milligrams per liter and the lead concentration is less than one microgram per liter. The lake's iron concentration ranges from 30 to 13,000 micrograms per liter, its manganese concentration ranges from less than 2 to 4620 micrograms per liter, its zinc concentration ranges from less than 10 to 57 micrograms per liter. The lake's concentration of aluminum ranges from 200 to 1400 micrograms per liter.

The light intensity on the surface of Lake Chillisquaque is 1200 micro-moles per square meter. 15 feet (4.6 m) below the surface of the lake, the light intensity is only 100 micro-moles per square meter. At this depth, only light wavelengths between 450 and 700 nanometers are visible, with 550-millimeter wavelengths (green light) being the most common. The Sechhi depth of the lake ranges from 1.20 metres (3.9 ft) to 3.80 metres (12.5 ft).

== History and etymology ==
Lake Chillisquaque is named after Middle Branch Chillisquaque Creek, which in turn is derived from a chillisuagi, a Native American word for "song of the wild goose". It was built in 1972 by the PPL, with the dam having been constructed in 1971. The lake is also owned by this organization. The lake's original purpose was as a secondary supply of cooling water for the Montour Power Plant. Still used as a supply of cooling water in emergencies, it is also used for recreation. As is typical of manmade lakes, however, this use of the lake only started several years after its creation.

One person drowned in a boating accident on February 16, 2006, and there was another accidental death in April 2011.

== Biology ==
=== Animals ===
A total of approximately 200 bird species have been observed on or near Lake Chillisquaque, which has been described as "a mecca for migrating birds". Numerous species, including more than 50 species of waterfowl pass by the lake during migration in March. These include ducks, geese, swans, and other species. Shorebirds are also common on the lake. The Montour Preserve and the lake are in the Central Susquehanna Wild Pheasant Recovery Area. A sizable population of ringneck pheasants can be found near the lake.

Additionally, numerous species of fish are stocked in Lake Chillisquaque by the Pennsylvania Fish and Boat Commission. These include bullhead catfish, largemouth bass, yellow perch, northern pike, and several other species. A 2005 trapnet survey by the Pennsylvania Fish and Boat Commission showed that the most common fish species in Lake Chillisquaque was the black crappie, of which 717 individuals were observed. These ranged between 3 inches (7.6 cm) and 19 inches (48 cm) long. 290 golden shiners were also observed in the survey, as were 168 bluegills, which ranged between 2 inches (5.1 cm) and 9 inches (23 cm). 106 walleyes from 7 to 28 inches (18 to 71 cm) were also observed. Less common fish species in the lake include yellow perch, of which 83 specimens between 3 inches (7.6 cm) and 14 inches (36 cm) long were observed; pumpkinseeds, 21 of which were observed; northern pikes, 19 of which between 15 inches (38 cm) and 35 inches (89 cm) long were observed; and white suckers, 16 of which were observed. Additionally, eight quillback carpsuckers, five largemouth bass, four rock bass, three bluntnose minnows, three common carp, two fathead minnows, and a single green sunfish. An electrofishing survey done by the Pennsylvania Fish and Boat Commission on Lake Chillisquaque discovered 54 walleyes from 5 to 23 inches (13 to 58 cm) long and 48 largemouth bass from 8 to 18 inches (20 to 46 cm).

=== Plants ===
Twelve tree species have been observed near Lake Chillisquaque. These include two oak species, two maple spaces, red elm, boxelder, shagbark hickory, black tupelo, American basswood, eastern hop-hornbeam, black ash, and musclewood. Ten shrub species also grow near the lake. These include three dogwood species, two holly species, multiflora rose, Morrow's honeysuckle, speckled alder, spicebush, and mayberry. Eighteen species of herbs live on the lake, as well. Five of these species are sedges. Cattails and beds of grass grow along the shores of Lake Chillisquaque. Additionally, a sizable population of Rotala ramosior grows on the lake.

=== Microbes ===
Various types of cyanobacteria inhabit Lake Chillisquaque. The specific genera that inhabit the lake vary at different times of the year and also at different depths within the lake. Due to the presence of light attenuation in the lake, light plays a role in determining which species of cyanobacteria inhabit it.

In September 2009, the most common type of microbe on the surface of Lake Chillisquaque was Oscillatoria, which made up approximately 75 percent of the total. Raphidiopsis was the second most common type, making up approximately 15 percent of the total. In May 2010, approximately 40 percent of the microbes were Navicula and 35 percent were Oscillatoria. Slightly less than 10 percent of the microbes are Anabaena. In July 2010, Oscillatoria and Synechococcus each made up approximately 25 percent of the microbes and between 10 and 15 percent were Anabaena.

Slightly less than 60 percent of the microbes 15 feet (4.6 m) under the surface of Lake Chillisquaque were of the genus Oscillatoria in September 2009. Slightly more than 10 percent each of the microbes were of the genera Xylophilus and Verrucomicrobium. In May 2010, slightly less than 40 percent of the microbes in the depths of the lake were of the genus Dolichospermum. The genera Synechococcus, Navicula, and Xylophilus each made up approximately 20 percent of the microbes. In July 2010, nearly 85 percent of the microbes were of the genus Xylophilus and less than 10 percent were of the genus Oscillatoria.

== Recreation ==
Fishing, including ice fishing, is a common pastime on Lake Chillisquaque. Fishing and boating are permitted on the lake at any time of day, although boats fueled by gasoline are forbidden. Boating of any kind is also forbidden annually between March 15 and April 30 and is also forbidden in Goose Cove year round. The only area for boating access on the lake is on the eastern side of the lake, at the Heron Cove Boat Access Area. The paddling and running stages of the Chilli Challenge triathlon are on Lake Chillisquaque and the Chillisuagi Trail, respectively.

Lake Chillisquaque is surrounded by a thousand-acre nature preserve known as the Montour Preserve, which is also owned by the PPL. A 148-acre wildlife refuge is also located near the lake. A pair of hiking trails known as the Chillisuagi Trail and the Ridgefield Point Trail circumnavigate the lake. Their combined length is 4.8 miles (7.7 km). The latter trail is not blazed. The Chillisuagi Trail is wide and fairly flat for part of its length, but is hillier near Goose Cove. On the eastern side of the lake, the trail stays close to the shoreline, but it passes through fields, meadows, and forests on the western side. The scenery on Lake Chillisquauque is described as "good to very good" by Jeff Mitchell in his book Paddling Pennsylvania: Canoeing and Kayaking the Keystone State's Rivers and Lakes. The lake is one of 18 lakes in Pennsylvania with Panfish Enhancement Special Regulations.

== See also ==
- Chillisquaque Creek
- List of lakes of Pennsylvania
