= Duodenibacillus =

Scientific classification
- Domain: Bacteria
- Kingdom: Pseudomonadati
- Phylum: Pseudomonadota
- Class: Betaproteobacteria
- Order: Burkholderiales
- Family: Sutterellaceae
- Genus: Duodenibacillus; Mailhe et al. 2017

Species
- D. massiliensis

Genus of bacteria

Duodenibacillus is a Gram-negative genus of bacteria from the family of Sutterellaceae with one known species (Duodenibacillus massiliensis).Duodenibacillus massiliensis has been isolated from the human duodenum.
