= Xylophilus =

Xylophilus may refer to:

- Xylophilus (bacterium), a bacteria genus in the family Xanthomonadaceae
- Xylophilus (beetle), a beetles genus in the family Eucnemidae
