= Middle Branch Chillisquaque Creek =

Coordinates: 41°04′56″N 76°39′54″W

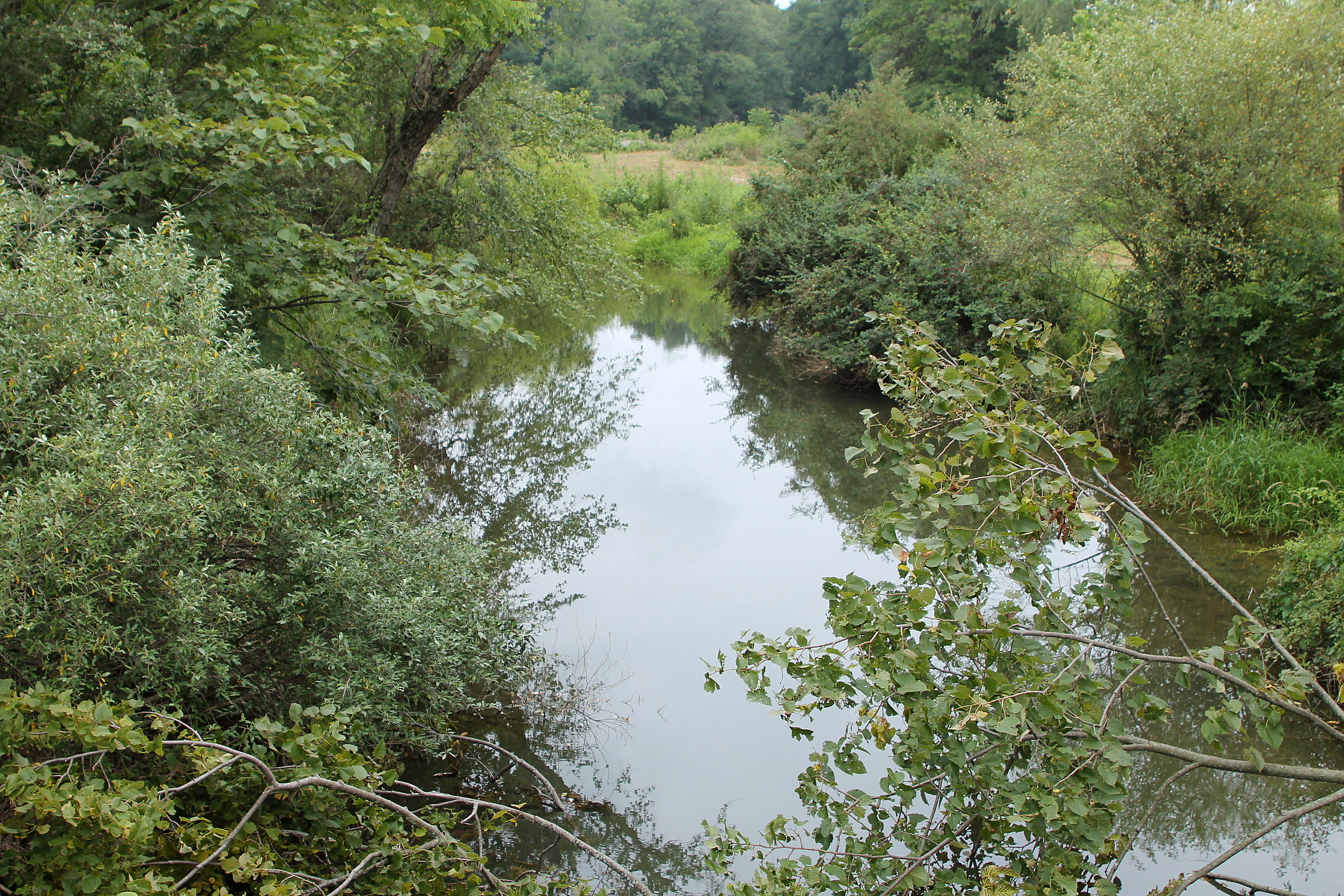
- Middle Branch Chillisquaque Creek downstream of Lake Chillisquaque
- Etymology: Native American word for either a "place frequented by snowbirds" or "frozen duck"

Physical characteristics
- Source
  - location: valley in Madison Township, Columbia County, Pennsylvania
  - elevation: 660 to 680 feet (200 to 210 m)
- Mouth
  - location: Chillisquaque Creek in Derry Township, Montour County, Pennsylvania
  - elevation: 522 ft (159 m)
- Length: 5.2 mi (8.4 km)
- Basin size: 9.64 mi^{2} (25.0 km^{2})

Middle Branch Chillisquaque Creek is a tributary of Chillisquaque Creek in Columbia County and Montour County, in Pennsylvania, in the United States. It is approximately 5.2 miles (8.4 km) long and flows through Madison Township in Columbia County and Anthony and Derry Townships in Montour County. The creek's watershed has an area of 9.64 square miles (25.0 km^{2}). There are 14.35 miles (23.09 km) of streams in the watershed. Lake Chillisquaque is also in the creek. There are 122 features classified as "disturbances" on Middle Branch Chillisquaque Creek. Two bridges more than 20 feet (6.1 m) long cross the creek.

== Course ==
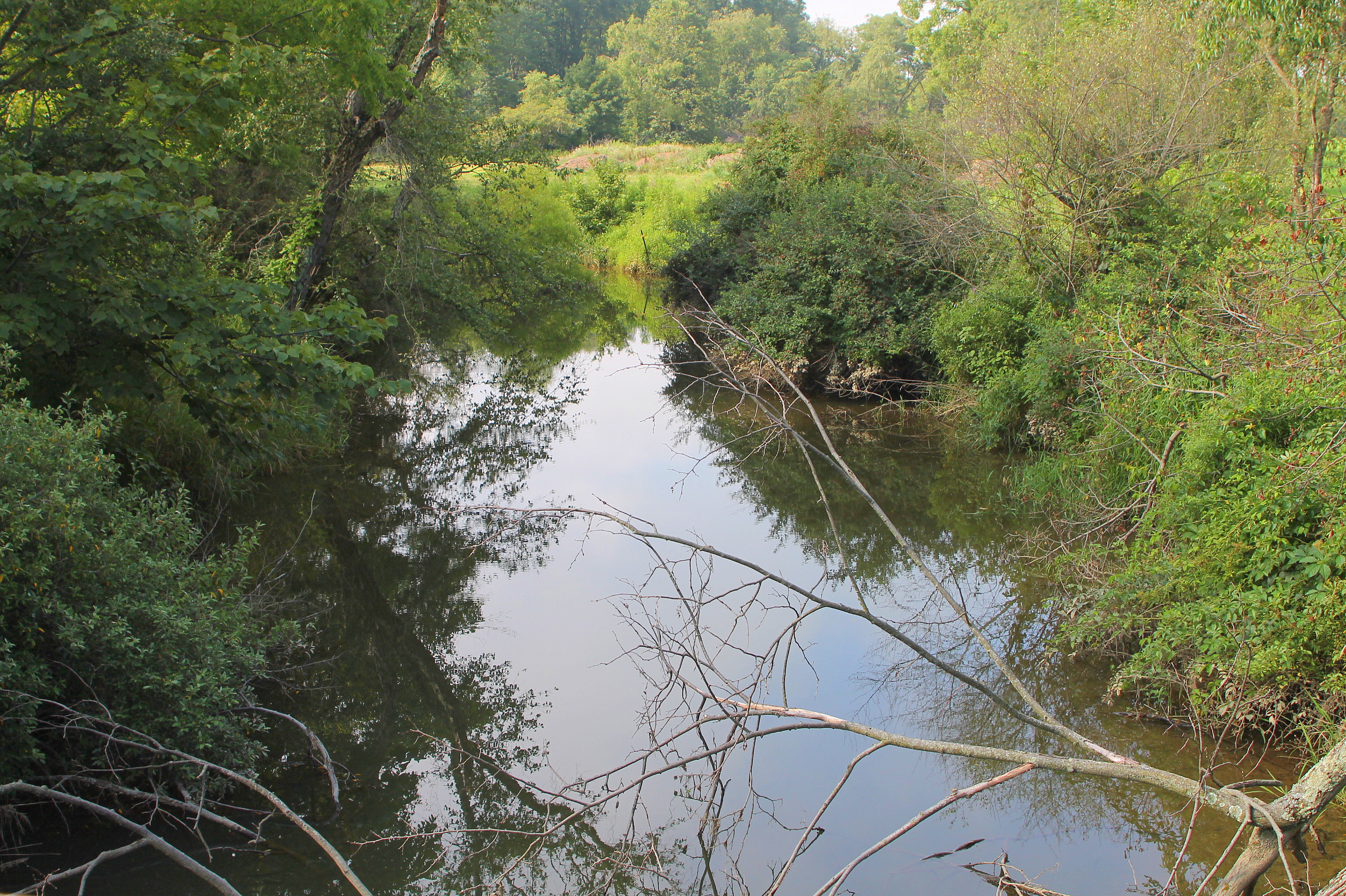
Middle Branch Chillisquaque Creek in July 2015

Middle Branch Chillisquaque Creek begins in a valley in western Madison Township, Columbia County. It flows southwest through the valley into Anthony Township, Montour County, where it flows southwest for a few miles before leaving the valley and crossing Pennsylvania Route 44. The creek then turns south and flows through Lake Chillisquaque. South of the lake, the creek flows through a flat area for some distance. It then exits Anthony Township and enters Derry Township, Montour County. In Derry Township, the creek almost immediately meets East Branch Chillisquaque Creek to form Chillisquaque Creek.

Middle Branch Chillisquaque Creek joins Chillisquaque Creek 19.96 miles (32.12 km) upstream of its mouth.

== Hydrology ==
Middle Branch Chillisquaque Creek is ranked 6th in priority on the 305B Stream Listings in the watershed of Chillisquaque Creek. It experiences siltation and has been subjected to hydromodifcation and flow alterations.

The water temperature of Middle Branch Chillisquaque Creek ranges from approximately 0 to 22 °C (32 to 72 °F).

The concentration of alkalinity in Middle Branch Chillisquaque Creek ranges from under 10 to over 70 milligrams per liter. The concentrations of nitrates and phosphates are both high.

== Geology and geography ==
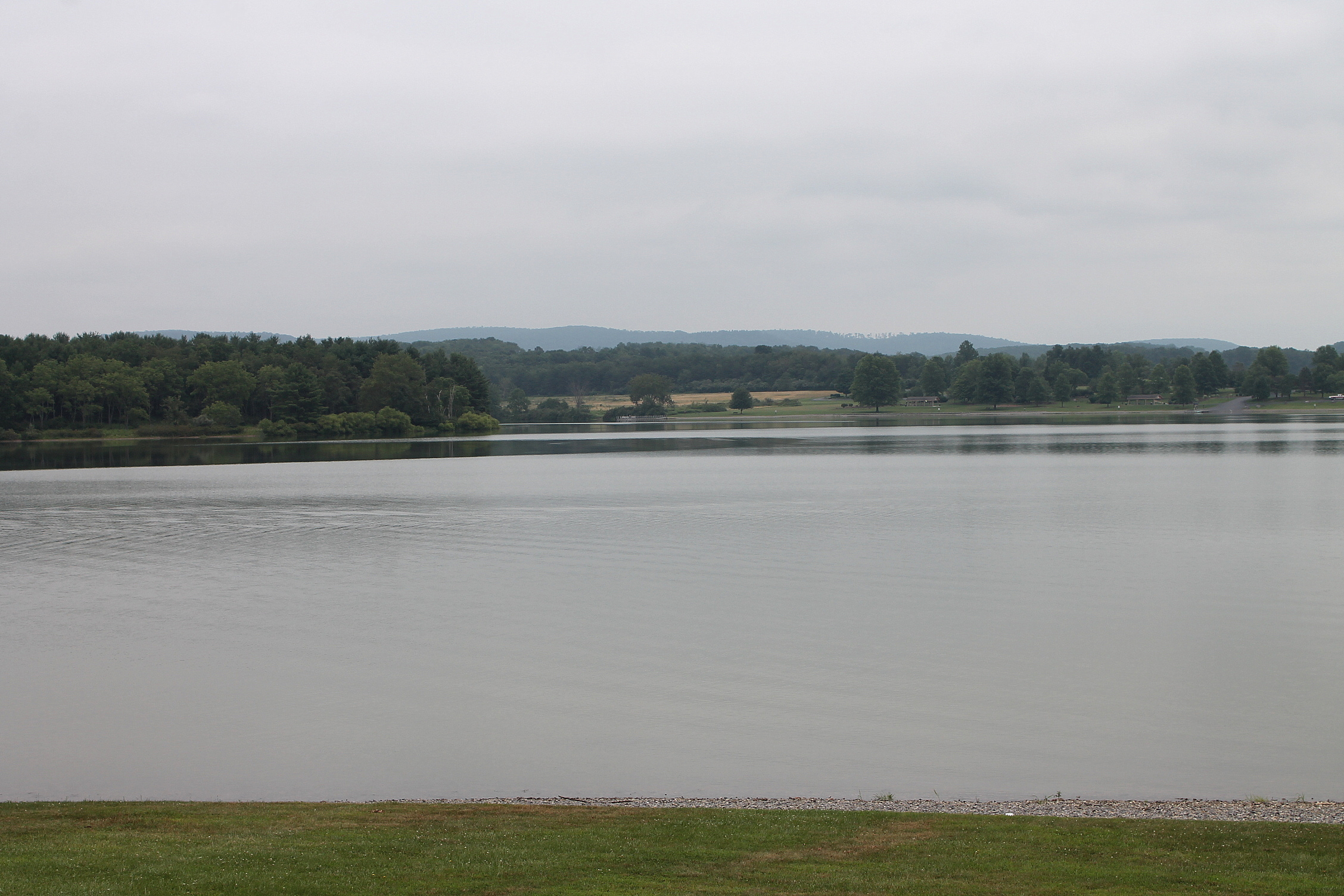
Lake Chillisquaque, a lake on Middle Branch Chillisquaque Creek

The depth of Middle Branch Chillisquaque Creek near Pennsylvania Route 44 typically ranges between a few inches and a foot (30 centimeters), but is occasionally over 20 inches (51 cm).

There are 122 features classified as "disturbances" on Middle Branch Chillisquaque Creek. 96 of these (78.7 percent) are erosion sites, 45 of which are on the creek's right bank and 51 of which are on the creek's left bank. 14 of the "disturbances" are gravel bars, 7 are bridges, 3 are riprap, and 2 are pipes.

There are nearly 30 stream banks on East Branch Chillisquaque Creek that area between 0 feet (0 m) and 50 feet (15 m) long. Slightly more than 20 are less than 6 feet (1.8 m) high, 5 are 6 to 9 feet (1.8 to 2.7 m) high, and approximately two are over 9 feet (2.7 m) high. There are slightly over 30 banks on the creek that are 51 to 100 feet (16 to 30 m) long. Between 15 and 20 are under 6 feet (1.8 m) high, slightly more than 10 are 6 to 9 feet (1.8 to 2.7 m) high, and approximately three are over 9 feet (2.7 m) high. The creek has 25 banks that are 101 to 250 feet (31 to 76 m) long. Of these, there are approximately equal numbers of banks less than 6 feet (1.8 m) high and 6 to 9 feet (1.8 to 2.7 m) high and none higher than 9 feet (2.7 m).

There are several stream banks on East Branch Chillisquaque Creek that are between 251 feet (77 m) and 500 feet (150 m). Five are less than 6 feet (1.8 m) high and two are over 6 feet (1.8 m) hingh. The creek also has several banks over 500 feet (150 m) long, all of which are less than 6 feet (1.8 m) high.

The streambed of Middle Branch Chillisquaque Creek is publicly owned. The elevation of the creek near its mouth is 522 feet (159 m) above sea level. Near its source, the creek's elevation is between 860 feet (260 m) and 880 feet (270 m).

== Watershed ==
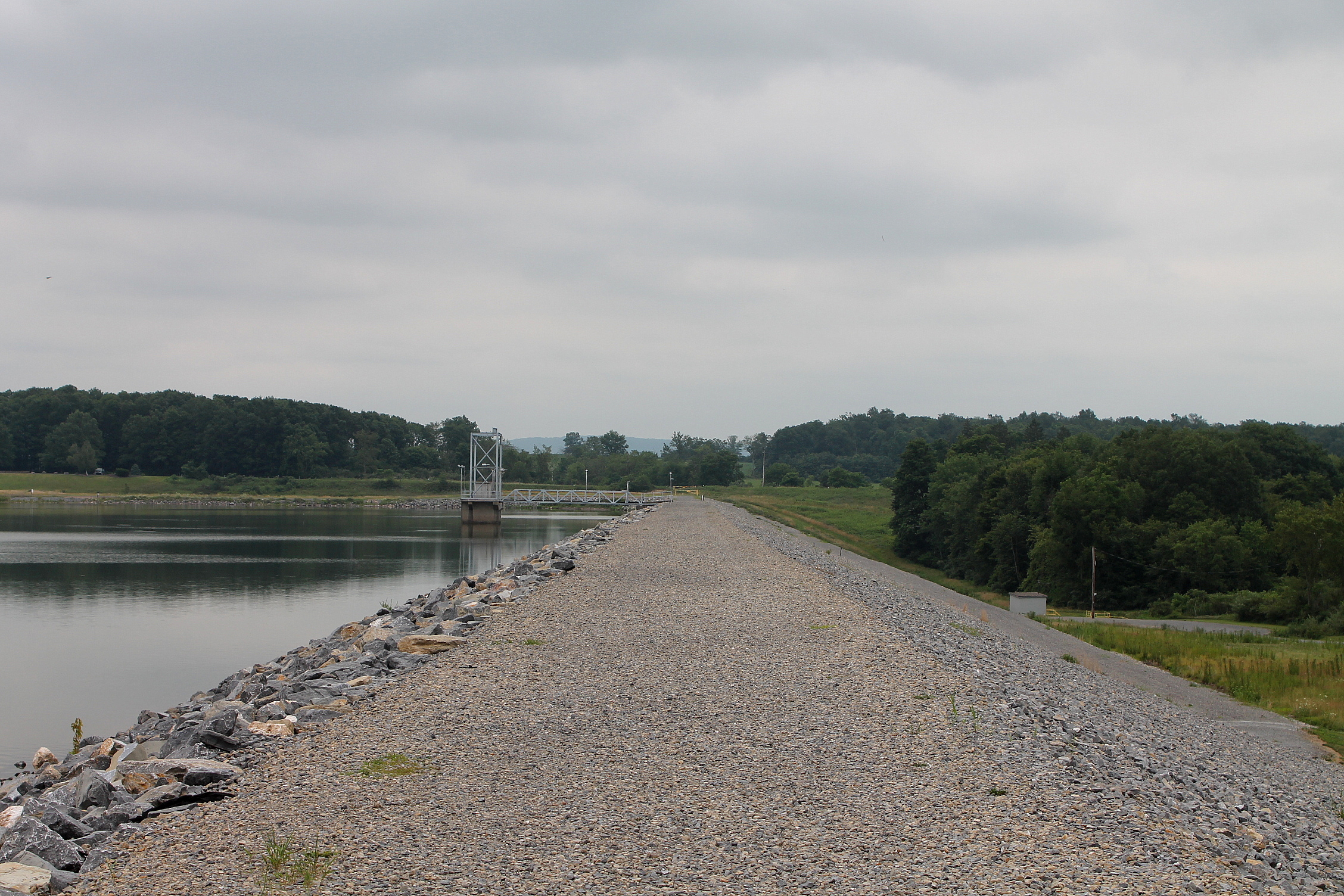
The Chillisquaque Dam on Lake Chillisquaque

The watershed of Middle Branch Chillisquaque Creek has an area of 6.94 square miles (18.0 km^{2}). There are 14.35 miles (23.09 km) of streams in the watershed of Middle Branch Chillisquaque Creek. 12.86 miles (20.70 km), or 89.6 percent, are classified as "not attaining".

Lake Chillisquaque is a reservoir located on Middle Branch Chillisquaque Creek and is the largest lake in Montour County. It has an area of 165 acres. The lake is dammed by an earth-fill dam that is 2,000 feet (610 m) long and 54 feet (16 m) high.

Middle Branch Chillisqauque Creek is the most significant tributary of Lake Chillisqauque.

== History, recreation, and etymology ==
Lake Chillisquaque was created on Middle Branch Chillisquaque Creek in 1972. Its original purpose was as a supply of cooling water for a nearby power plant. Two bridges more than 20 feet (6.1 m) long cross the creek. One was built in 1923 and is 43.0 feet (13.1 m) long and the other was built in 1932 and is 28.9 feet (8.8 m) long. Both bridges are made of concrete.

The Chillisquagi Trail in the Montour Preserve crosses Middle Branch Chillisquaque Creek.

The word chillisquaque in Middle Branch Chillisquaque Creek's name comes from either the Native American word chilisuagi, which refers to a place commonly visited by snowbirds (specifically, a "place frequented by snowbirds") or the Native American word for "frozen duck".

== Biology ==
Lake Chillisquaque is stocked by the Pennsylvania Fish and Boat Commission. Middle Branch Chillisquaque Creek is designated as a warmwater fishery.

== See also ==
- List of rivers of Pennsylvania
- West Branch Chillisquaque Creek
