= Parasutterella =

Scientific classification
- Domain: Bacteria
- Kingdom: Pseudomonadati
- Phylum: Pseudomonadota
- Class: Betaproteobacteria
- Order: Burkholderiales
- Family: Sutterellaceae
- Genus: Parasutterella; Nagai et al. 2009

Species
- Parasutterella excrementihominis Parasutterella secunda

Genus of bacteria

Parasutterella is a genus of Gram-negative, circular/rod-shaped, obligate anaerobic, non-spore forming bacteria from the Pseudomonadota phylum, Betaproteobacteria class and the family Sutterellaceae. Previously, this genus was considered "unculturable," meaning that it could not be characterized through conventional laboratory techniques, such as grow in culture due its unique requirements of anaerobic environment. The genus was initially discovered through 16S rRNA sequencing and bioinformatics analysis (a methodology to analyze the microbiome). By analyzing the sequence similarity, Parasutterella was determined to be related most closely to the genus Sutterella and previously classified in the family Alcaligenaceae.

In 2009, Parasutterella excrementihominis was cultured and characterized. In 2011, another species of Parasutterella, Parasutterella secunda, was discovered, and both Parasutterella and Sutterella species were reclassified under the family Sutterellaceae. (This reclassification occurred due to the similar biochemical potential in the Sutterella and Parasutterella genera different from other genera in the family Alcaligenaceae.) To date, Parasutterella contains two cultured species and numerous uncultured species. Both cultured species were isolated from human feces and are considered to be part of the gut microbiome in a healthy individual.

== Characteristics ==
Parasutterella species are Gram-negative, coccobacilli (circular and rod-shaped), strictly (or obligate) anaerobic, non-motile bacteria. When cultured, colonies from both P. excrementihominis and P. secunda appeared translucent to beige in color, convex and circular in shape, and extremely small in size. Both species do not metabolize glucose, lactate, or succinate or produce indole or short-chain fatty acids. Additionally, these bacteria do not reduce nitrate and are catalase-negative (inability to breakdown hydrogen peroxide into oxygen and water), urease-negative (inability to hydrolyze urea to ammonia and carbon dioxide), and oxidase-negative (inability to use oxygen). However, these bacteria have the following enzymes: arginine dihydrolase, esterase (C4), esterase lipase, naphthol-AS-BI-phosphohydrolase, and alkaline phosphatase. P. excrementihominis can grow in bile, although P. secunda has not been described in terms of this ability. Moreover, P. excrementihominis and P. secunda are unique in terms of sequences and certain biochemical processes. For example, the major respiratory quinone of P. excrementihominis was methylmenaquinone-6 whereas the dominant respiratory quinone for P. secunda is methylmenaquinone-5.

Parasutterella and Sutterella contain several similarities, including sequence homology, inability to grow in an aerobic environment, oxidase- and catalase-negative, and the dominant major quinone of either methylmenaquinone-5 or -6 or menaquinone-5 or -6. Still, Parasutterella species can be differentiated from Sutterella species in several ways. For example, colonies from Sutterella tend to appear a little larger and under the microscope, appear as bacilli or rod-shaped bacteria. While both species of Parasutterella do not reduce nitrate, some species from Sutterella have the ability for nitrate reduction. Both P. excrementihominis and P. secunda have the enzyme esterase, whereas no species in Sutterella to date have esterase (C4). Also, the major cellular fatty acids in Parasutterella are different than those associated with Sutterella.

== Molecular taxonomy ==
Parasutterella has been divided into three different groups on the basis of their 16S rRNA sequences: P. excrementihominis, P. secunda, and uncultured bacterium. In the Silva 16S rRNA reference library, each group can then be further divided into various accession numbers or operational taxonomical units (OTUs) due to slight differences in sequence. P. excrementihominis has six different OTUs or strains, whereas P. secunda has three different OTUs.

== Associations in human health ==
Parasutterella is still a relatively new genus and has been exclusively published in regards to literature on the intestinal microbiome (with the exception of the first two taxonomical papers on the discovery of P. excrementihominis and P. secunda). Both P. excrementihominis and P. secunda were isolated from fecal samples from healthy Japanese individuals and have been found to be part of the intestinal microbiome in the United States. In a study that examined the effect of introducing and reversing diet-induced obesity on the gut microbiome and metabolism in mice, Parasutterella was decreased in mice with diet-induced obesity and increased in controls and reversal of the high fat diet with a healthier alternative (normal chow). Other studies have shown increases of Parasutterella with sugar and alcohol consumption. Additional microbiome studies have associated increased abundance of Parasutterella with dysbiosis, or a lack of diversity in the microbial composition typically in the gut. (Dysbiosis has been correlated with intestinal and metabolic dysfunction and several diseases, including inflammatory bowel diseases and obesity.) For example, Parasutterella was increased in the submucosa in the ileum of the small intestine in individuals with Crohn's disease and hypertriglyceridemia-related acute necrotizing pancreatitis in rats. More research is needed to further explore the role of Parasutterella species as a part of the healthy gut microbiome and in microbial dysbiosis.

== See also ==
- Pseudomonadota
- Betaproteobacteria
- Sutterellaceae
- Parasutterella excrementihominis
- Parasutterella secunda
