= Parasutterella secunda =

Scientific classification
- Domain: Bacteria
- Kingdom: Pseudomonadati
- Phylum: Pseudomonadota
- Class: Betaproteobacteria
- Order: Burkholderiales
- Family: Sutterellaceae
- Genus: Parasutterella
- Species: P. secunda

Binomial name
- Parasutterella secunda Morotomi et al. 2011

Type strain
- DSM 22575, JCM 16078, YIT 12071

Species of bacterium

Parasutterella secunda is a Gram-negative, nonsaccharolytic, strictly anaerobic, non-spore-forming, nonmotile bacterium of the genus Parasutterella in the family Sutterellaceae, isolated from human faeces. Colonies of Parasutterella secunda are translucent to beige colored.
