= Methylophilales-1 RNA motif =

Methylophilales-1
- Consensus secondary structure and sequence conservation of Methylophilales-1 RNA

Identifiers
- Symbol: Methylophilales-1
- Rfam: RF03011

Other data
- RNA type: Gene; sRNA
- SO: SO:0001263
- PDB structures: PDBe

The Methylophilales-1 RNA motif is a conserved RNA structure that was discovered by bioinformatics. Energetically stable tetraloops often occur in this motif. The Methylophilales-1 motif is found in Methylophilales and metagenomic sequences derived from lake sediment.

Methylophilales-1 RNAs likely function in trans as small RNAs.
