= Turicimonas =

Scientific classification
- Domain: Bacteria
- Kingdom: Pseudomonadati
- Phylum: Pseudomonadota
- Class: Betaproteobacteria
- Order: Burkholderiales
- Family: Sutterellaceae
- Genus: Turicimonas; Lagkouvardos et al. 2017

Type species
- Turicimonas muris

Species
- T. muris

Genus of bacteria

Turicimonas is a genus of bacteria from the family of Sutterellaceae with one known species (Turicimonas muris). Turicimonas muris has been isolated from the caecal content of a mouse.
