= Methylibium petroleiphilum =

Scientific classification
- Domain: Bacteria
- Kingdom: Pseudomonadati
- Phylum: Pseudomonadota
- Class: Betaproteobacteria
- Order: Burkholderiales
- Family: Sphaerotilaceae
- Genus: Methylibium
- Species: M. petroleiphilum

Binomial name
- Methylibium petroleiphilum Nakatsu et al. 2006

Species of bacterium

Methylibium petroleiphilum is a species of methyl tert-butyl ether-degrading methylotroph, the type species of its genus. It is a Gram-negative, rod-shaped, motile, non-pigmented, facultative aerobe, with type strain PM1^{T} (=ATCC BAA-1232^{T} =LMG 22953^{T}).
