= Sterolibacterium =

Scientific classification
- Domain: Bacteria
- Kingdom: Pseudomonadati
- Phylum: Pseudomonadota
- Class: Betaproteobacteria
- Order: Spirillales
- Family: Sterolibacteriaceae
- Genus: Sterolibacterium; Tarlera and Denner 2003
- Species: S. denitrificans

Binomial name
- Sterolibacterium denitrificans Tarlera and Denner 2003

Type strain
- ATCC BAA-354, Chol-1S, chol1, DSM 13999

Genus of bacteria

Sterolibacterium is a genus of gram-negative, oxidase- and catalase-positive rod-shaped bacteria from the family Sterolibacteriaceae which belongs to the class Betaproteobacteria. So far there is only one species known of this genus, Sterolibacterium denitrificans.

Sterolibacterium denitrificans is a motile with a single polar flagellum.
