= Methylobacillus =

Scientific classification
- Domain: Bacteria
- Kingdom: Pseudomonadati
- Phylum: Pseudomonadota
- Class: Betaproteobacteria
- Order: Methylophilaceae
- Genus: Methylobacillus; Yordy and Weaver 1977

Type species
- Methylobacillus glycogenes

Species
- M. flagellatus M. glycogenes M. pratensis M. rhizosphaerae

Genus of bacteria

Methylobacillus is a genus of Gram-negative methylotrophic bacteria. The cells are rod-shaped.
