= Procabacteriaceae =

Scientific classification (Candidatus)
- Domain: Bacteria
- Phylum: Pseudomonadota
- Class: Betaproteobacteria
- Order: "Procabacteriales"
- Family: "Procabacteriaceae"

Genus and species
- Ca. "Procabacter"; Ca. "Procabacter acanthamoebae"

Family of bacteria

"Procabacteriaceae" is a Candidatus family of uncultivated Gram-negative Betaproteobacteria. The sole genus, "Candidatus Procabacter", was identified as an obligate endosymbiont of Acanthamoeba.
