= Xylophilus ampelinus =

Scientific classification
- Domain: Bacteria
- Kingdom: Pseudomonadati
- Phylum: Pseudomonadota
- Class: Betaproteobacteria
- Order: Burkholderiales
- Family: Comamonadaceae
- Genus: Xylophilus
- Species: X. ampelinus

Binomial name
- Xylophilus ampelinus Panagopoulos 1969

Type strain
- NCPPB 2217; ICMP 8920

Synonyms
- Xanthomonas ampelina Erwinia vitivora

Species of bacterium

Xylophilus ampelinus (syn. Xanthomonas ampelina and Erwinia vitivora) is a species of bacteria that can cause plant disease. It is available from the NCPPB in the United Kingdom and other international culture collections such as ICMP in New Zealand, and LMG/BCCM in Belgium.

Xylophilus ampelinus was known as Xanthomonas ampelina until it was renamed in 1969 by C.G. Panagopoulos. The type strain was isolated on 5 March 1966 by C.G. Panagopoulos from grape vine (Vitis vinifera var. Sultana) in Greece and was deposited into the NCPPB in 1968 from where it has been distributed to other culture collections for research and diagnostic reference material. Published references to the organism currently include "Panagopoulos, C.G. 1969. Annls. Inst. Phytopath. Benaki. N.S. 9: 59".

Xylophilus ampelinus is a rod-shaped bacterium that is considered slow growing at ambient temperatures of 25 degrees Celsius. It is gram negative and develops round, yellow colonies when grown on nutrient agar and after extended growth, becomes filamentous. The bacterium is catalase positive, Kovacs negative, urease positive, produced H_{2}S from cysteine, and did not produce acid from any carbohydrate media.

== Hosts and symptoms ==
Xylophilus ampelinus is only known to infect a singular species and related subspecies of grapevine, Vitis vinifera, which is native to the near east and has since spread across the globe to produce wine. Symptoms typically manifest 3–4 weeks in shoots and stems and in 10–14 days on leaves. This disease displays multiple symptoms depending on the location on the plant. On plant shoots, symptoms begin to appear in spring through June and first appear on the lower nodes of growth, before spreading upward along the shoot. The symptoms appear as red/brown streaks initially, before progressing into cracks in the woody structure and cankers, After this, shoots wilt and dry up, before eventually dying back; cross sections of stems show signs of a brownish mucus in the inner tissues. If infected post leaf growth, leaves typically show symptoms of chlorosis, angular red/brown lesions, and in some cases signs of bacterial ooze may be seen around these lesions. If infection occurs post bud break and flowers are present, these will typically develop a black color before dying and falling to the ground. Root symptoms are rare and typically manifest as general stunting of the plant shoots.

== Importance and economic impact ==
This pathogen has the potential to severely affect grape crops; the highest valued fruit crop across the globe due to the booming wine industry, which currently contributes $220 billion to the US economy alone. All V. vinifera subspecies are at risk of infection, with most of the geographic spread contained to South Africa, Greece, Turkey, and France. In infected vineyards, fruit harvest losses have been reported as high as 70% of typical yield. This illustrates the massive damage that X. ampelinus has the potential to cause grape growers not only in Europe, but to all areas practicing viticulture. The EPPO categorizes X. ampelinus as a quarantine A2 organism as its potential international spread and limited efficient control routes can lead to significant economic losses in previously unaffected regions.

== Disease cycle ==
The complete life cycle of X. ampelinus has yet to be fully described, however, continued research into infection steps is being undertaken. It is believed the bacteria overwinters in fallen grapes from the previous harvest, as well as remaining dormant and protected within the woody tissues of the vines. In a 2003 study by Grall et al., they discovered that depending on the mode of primary infection, different symptoms and disease spread was observed. If infected via a wound, similar to a pruning cut, infection occurred in the xylem tissues and was unable to spread upward throughout the plant and instead only infected nodes below the wound. It was found that if applied via foliar sprays, the bacterium would infiltrate the leaves and young shoots and spread to all areas of the vine, resulting in complete inoculation. Method of inoculation also caused different symptom displays. Wound only infection resulted in stem cankers and cracks, mostly resulting from hyperplasia of xylem and cambium tissues within the stem; very limited leaf lesions were observed. However, if sprayed on the plants, symptoms were systemic; visible stem cankers and cracks, leaf lesions, chlorosis, wilting, and eventually necrotic tissue.

== Management ==
Although current research is limited on the effects of chemical controls, historical studies have found no chemicals to be effective in eliminating or controlling the spread or infection of X. ampelinus. There have been anecdotal reports of a copper-based spray limiting spread within vineyards in South Africa, but these claims have not been substantiated with study. Cultural control via proper viticulture practices in the field are the only proven effective control measures. Any infected plant tissues should be burned, pruning should be done in dry environments with clean tools that are regularly disinfected, and avoidance of mass irrigation use is also recommended. It was also noted that most infection spread is local within a vineyard via natural water and wind action, however spread across great distances is possible if infected cuttings are distributed inadvertently. The bacteria can stay latent within stem tissues for up to 2 years and grafting infected stocks into healthy plants can result in new infection. Vine tissue taken from regions with known history of infection should be tested via ELISA or PCR to ensure pathogen free tissue and reduce the spread of the bacteria. Direct inoculation of the bacteria via environmental factors, irrigation, or plant grafting are the only known vectors of X. ampelinus, making control a relatively straightforward matter.

== Environment ==
Xylophilus ampelinus prefers humid and wet conditions which favor its spread from vine to vine within the vineyard. For this reason, it is recommended pruning be done on calm dry days to reduce possibility of transmission via tools. The bacteria can survive temps down to freezing for short periods of time and does not exhibit any natural heat restrictions to growth; thus, the pathogen's geographic distribution tends to be focused around temperate regions such as Greece, France, Germany, Turkey, and some areas of South Africa.
