= Denitratisoma =

Scientific classification
- Domain: Bacteria
- Kingdom: Pseudomonadati
- Phylum: Pseudomonadota
- Class: Betaproteobacteria
- Order: Spirillales
- Family: Sterolibacteriaceae
- Genus: Denitratisoma; Fahrbach et al. 2006
- Species: D. oestradiolicum

Binomial name
- Denitratisoma oestradiolicum Fahrbach et al. 2006

Genus of bacteria

Denitratisoma is a genus in the phylum Pseudomonadota (Bacteria). The only species is Denitratisoma oestradiolicum.

== Etymology ==
The name Denitratisoma derives from:
Latin pref. de-, away from; Neo-Latin noun nitras -atis, nitrate; Greek neuter gender noun soma (σῶμα), body; Neo-Latin neuter gender noun Denitratisoma, a body that reduces nitrate.

== Species ==
The genus contains a single species, namely Denitratisoma oestradiolicum; Neo-Latin noun oestradiol, oestradiol; Latin neuter gender suff. -icum, belonging to; Neo-Latin neuter gender adjective oestradiolicum, belonging to oestradiol, referring to oestradiol utilization.)
