= Xylophilus (bacterium) =

Scientific classification
- Domain: Bacteria
- Kingdom: Pseudomonadati
- Phylum: Pseudomonadota
- Class: Betaproteobacteria
- Order: Burkholderiales
- Family: Comamonadaceae
- Genus: Xylophilus; Willems et al. 1987

Type species
- Xylophilus ampelinuss

Species
- Xylophilus ampelinus Xylophilus rhododendri

Genus of bacteria

Xylophilus (from greek: xylon – "wood"; philus – "friend, loving") is a genus of bacteria, which includes bacteria that cause plant disease. Strains are available from international collections, such as the NCPPB in the United Kingdom, for legitimate researchers and plant disease diagnosticians working in premises licensed to hold it.

The genus Xylophilus currently comprises the species X. ampelinus, which affects grapevines. A second species, X. rhododendri, was described in 2020.
