= Anthony Township, Montour County, Pennsylvania =

Township in Pennsylvania, United States

Coordinates: 41°08′00″N 76°40′59″W

Anthony Township, Mountour County, Pennsylvania
- Township
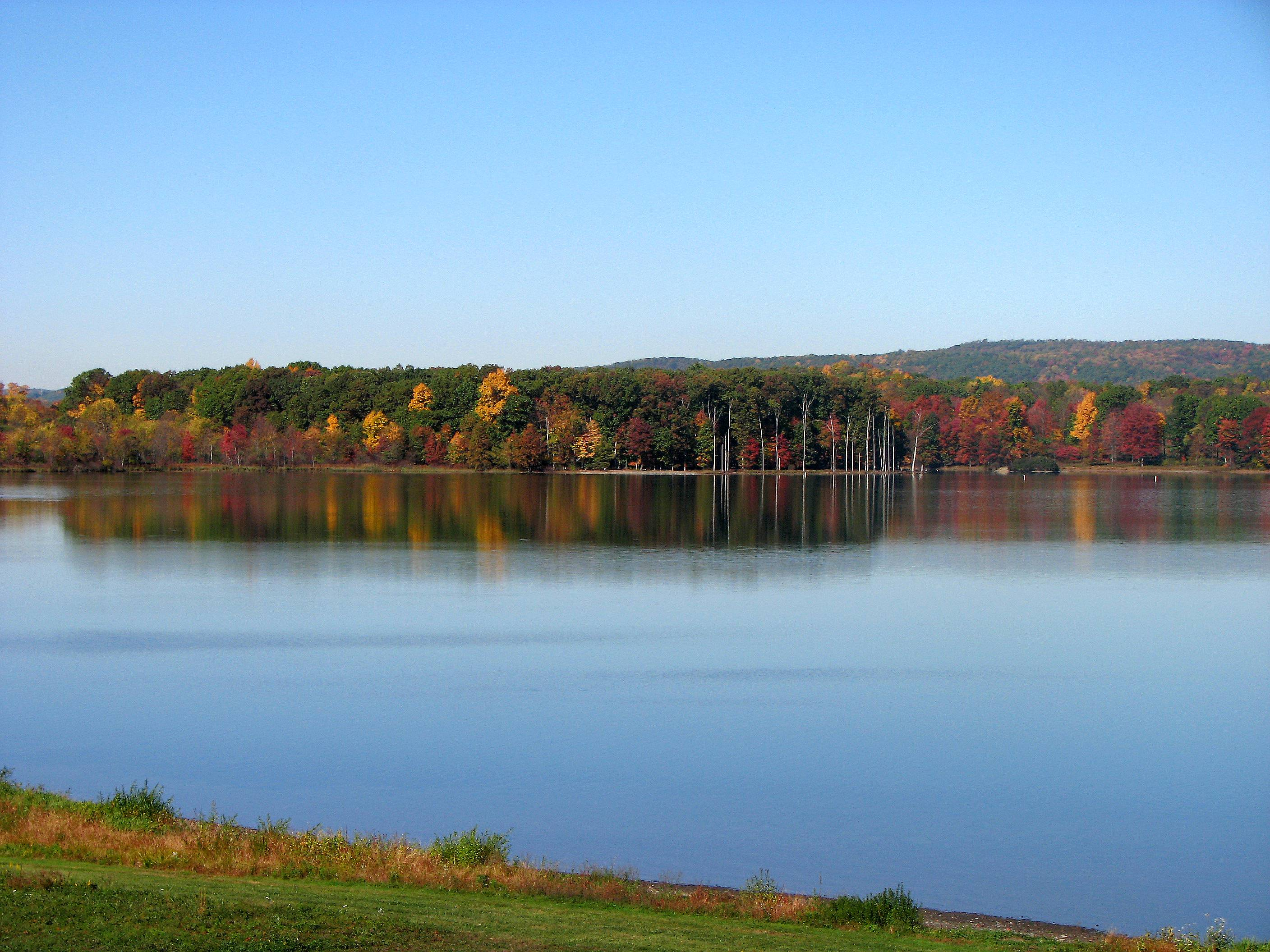
- Lake Chillisquaque at PP&L's Montour Preserve

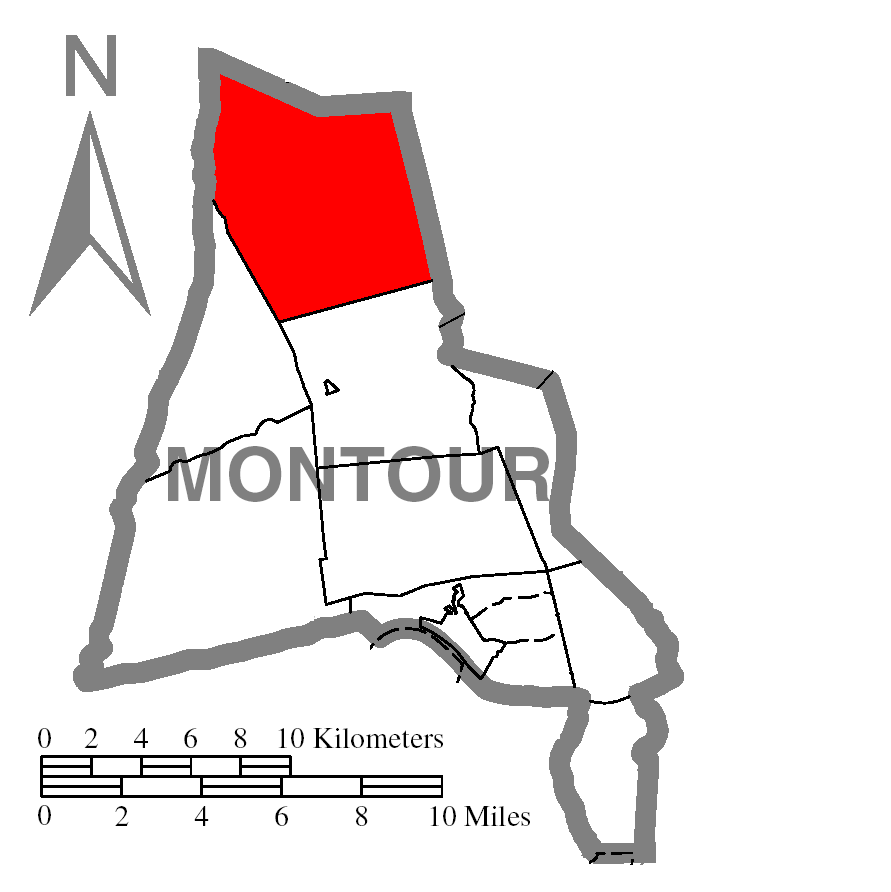
- Map of Montour County, Pennsylvania Highlighting Anthony Township

- Map of Montour County, Pennsylvania
- Country: United States
- State: Pennsylvania
- County: Montour
- Settled: 1792
- Incorporated: 1849

Area
  - Total: 26.25 sq mi (67.98 km^{2})
  - Land: 25.90 sq mi (67.09 km^{2})
  - Water: 0.34 sq mi (0.89 km^{2})

Population (2020)
  - Total: 1,444 ▼
  - Estimate (2021): 1,454
  - Density: 58.8/sq mi (22.72/km^{2})
- Area code: 570
- FIPS code: 42-093-02664
- Website: Anthony Township

Anthony Township is a township in Montour County, Pennsylvania, United States.

== Geography ==
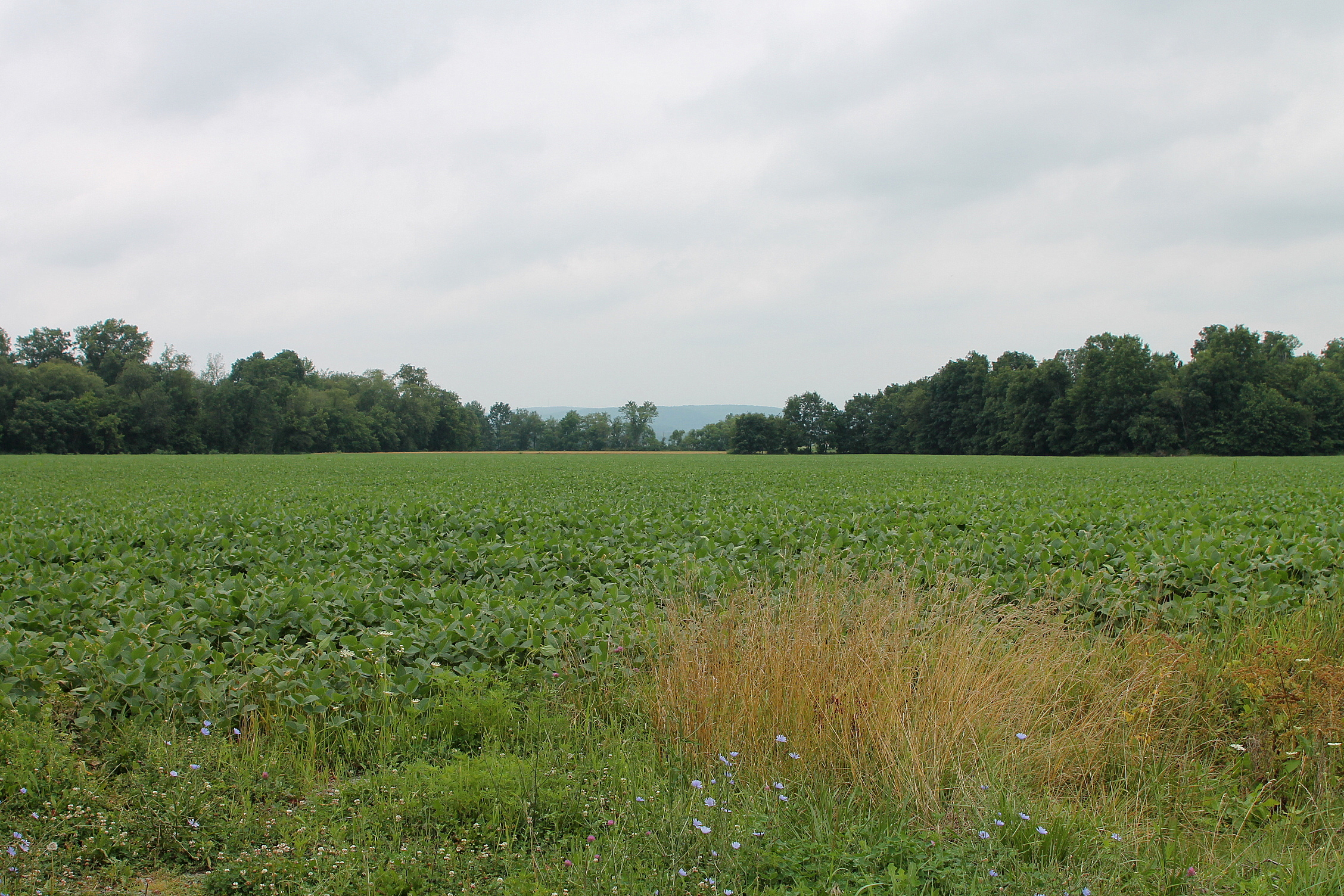
Field in Anthony Township with the Muncy Hills on the horizon

According to the U.S. Census Bureau, the township has a total area of 26.2 square miles (68 km^{2}), 26.0 square miles (67 km^{2}) of which is land and 0.3 square miles (0.78 km^{2}) (1.07%) of which is water.

Anthony Township's terrain is flat in the south, with rolling hills in the central region, and steep hills in the north. The township's land is mostly forest in the north and farmland elsewhere. Lake Chillisquaque is in the township.

== History ==
One of the first settlers in the area was Col. Robert Clark. The township was formed in 1849 from Derry Township and named after Joseph B. Anthony, who was the presiding judge when the township was formed.

On October 28, 2015, a militarized balloon crash-landed there, bringing the town to prominence after a century and a half of obscurity

== Demographics ==
Historical population
Census	Pop.	Note	%±
2000	1,388		—
2010	1,501		8.1%
2020	1,444		−3.8%
2021 (est.)	1,454		0.7%
U.S. Decennial Census

As of the census of 2000, there were 1,388 people, 486 households, and 391 families residing in the township. The population density was 53.5 inhabitants per square mile (20.7/km^{2}). There were 513 housing units at an average density of 19.8/sq mi (7.6/km^{2}). The racial makeup of the township was 98.92% White, 0.14% Native American, 0.29% Asian, 0.29% from other races, and 0.36% from two or more races. Hispanic or Latino of any race were 0.50% of the population.

There were 486 households, out of which 32.7% had children under the age of 18 living with them, 71.8% were married couples living together, 6.2% had a female householder with no husband present, and 19.5% were non-families. 16.0% of all households were made up of individuals, and 7.4% had someone living alone who was 65 years of age or older. The average household size was 2.86 and the average family size was 3.20.

In the township the population was spread out, with 28.2% under the age of 18, 7.3% from 18 to 24, 28.2% from 25 to 44, 24.3% from 45 to 64, and 12.0% who were 65 years of age or older. The median age was 37 years. For every 100 females, there were 97.4 males. For every 100 females age 18 and over, there were 98.8 males.

The median income for a household in the township was $39,946, and the median income for a family was $42,150. Males had a median income of $30,809 versus $23,359 for females. The per capita income for the township was $15,962. About 2.8% of families and 6.4% of the population were below the poverty line, including 8.5% of those under age 18 and 7.9% of those age 65 or over.
