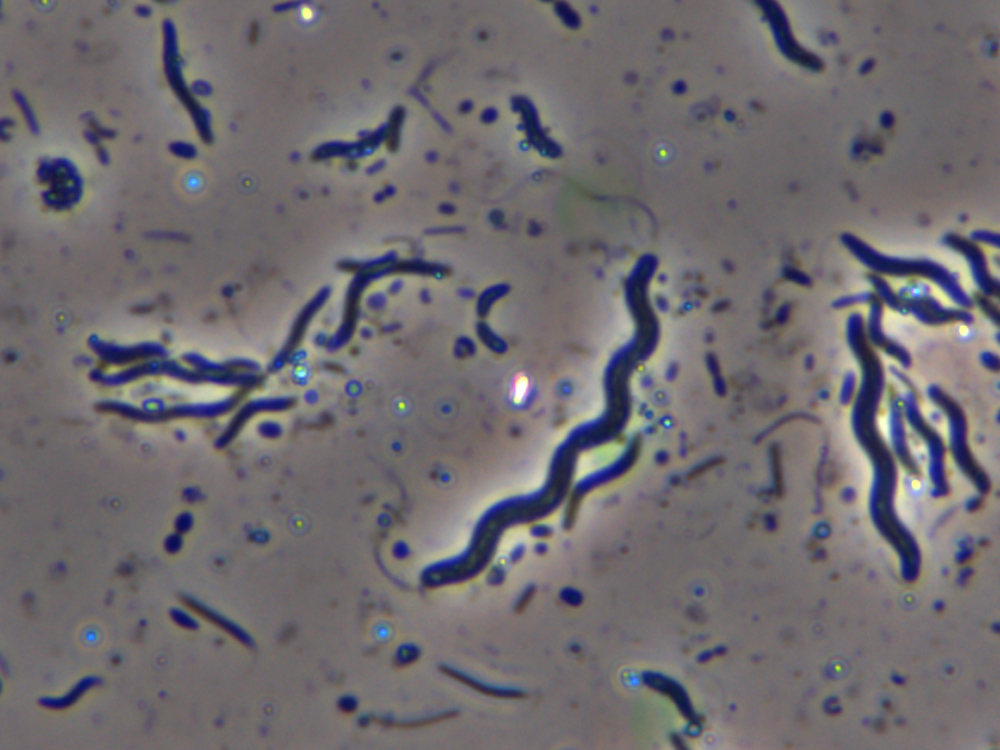
- Spirillum

Scientific classification
- Domain: Bacteria
- Kingdom: Pseudomonadati
- Phylum: Pseudomonadota
- Class: Betaproteobacteria
- Order: Nitrosomonadales
- Family: Spirillaceae

Genera
- Spirillum

= Spirillaceae =

Spirillum

Family of bacteria

Spirillaceae is a family in the order Nitrosomonadales in the class Betaproteobacteria of the bacteria.

Only one genus, Spirillum, has been described in this family.
