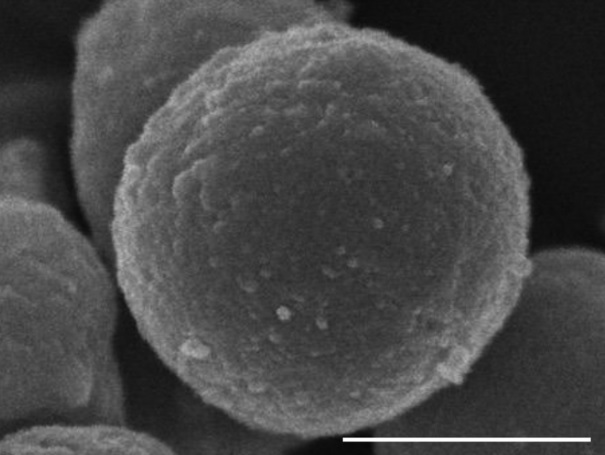
- Sutterella megalosphaeroides

Scientific classification
- Domain: Bacteria
- Kingdom: Pseudomonadati
- Phylum: Pseudomonadota
- Class: Betaproteobacteria
- Order: Burkholderiales
- Family: Sutterellaceae; Morotomi et al. 2011

Genera
- Dakarella; Duodenibacillus; Parasutterella; Sutterella; Turicimonas

= Sutterellaceae =

Family of bacteria

The Sutterellaceae are a family of Betaproteobacteria. Cells of Sutterellaceae are Gram-negative, oxidase- and catalase-negative, and grow under microaerophilic or anaerobic atmospheres.
