= Methylophilaceae =

Scientific classification
- Domain: Bacteria
- Kingdom: Pseudomonadati
- Phylum: Pseudomonadota
- Class: Betaproteobacteria
- Order: Methylophilaceae; Garrity et al. 2006

Genera
- Methylophilus; Methylobacillus; Methylovorax

Family of bacteria

The Methylophilaceae are a family of Pseudomonadota, given their own order. Like all Pseudomonadota, they are Gram-negative. The cells are slightly curved or straight rod-shaped.
