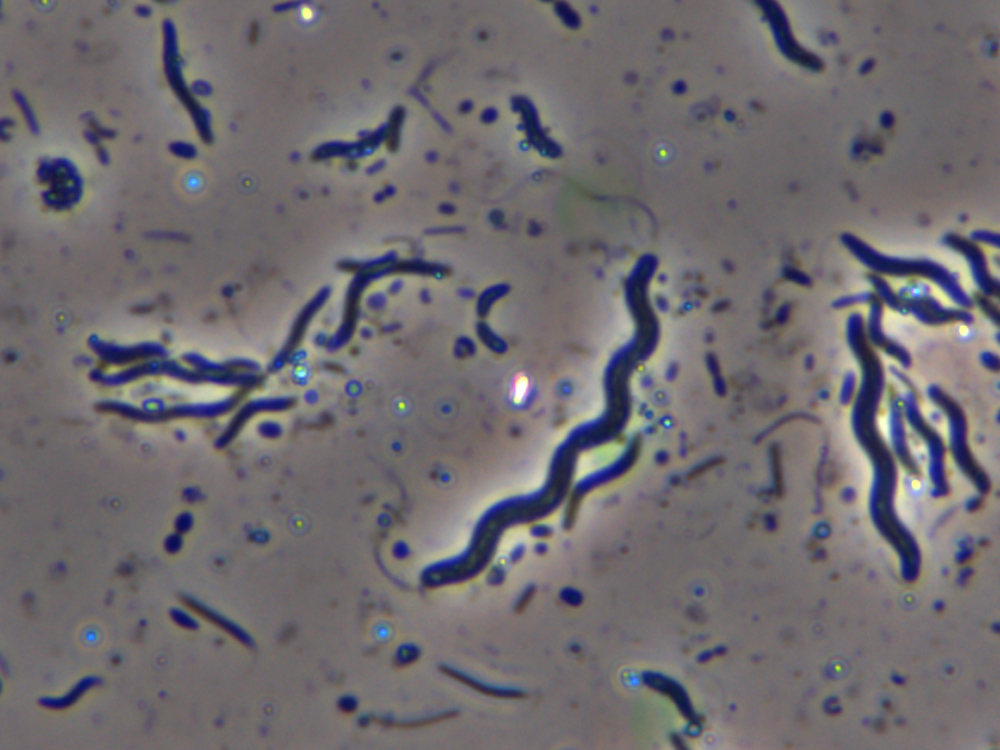
- Spirillum

Scientific classification
- Domain: Bacteria
- Kingdom: Pseudomonadati
- Phylum: Pseudomonadota
- Class: Betaproteobacteria
- Order: Nitrosomonadales; Garrity et al. 2006

Families
- Nitrosomonadaceae; Methylophilaceae; Spirillaceae; Thiobacillaceae; Gallionellaceae; Sterolibacteraceae

= Nitrosomonadales =

Order of bacteria

The Nitrosomonadales are an order of the class Betaproteobacteria in the phylum Pseudomonadota. Like all members of their class, they are Gram-negative.

The order is divided into six families:

- Nitrosomonadaceae (type family) comprises the genera Nitrosomonas (type genus), Nitrosolobus and Nitrosospira.
- Methylophilaceae comprises the genera Methylophilus (type genus), Methylobacillus and Methylovorus.
- Spirillaceae comprises the genus Spirillum (type genus)
- Thiobacillaceae comprises the genera Thiobacillus (type genus), Annwoodia, Sulfuritortus.
- Gallionellaceae comprises the genera Gallionella (type genus), Ferriphaselus, Sulfuriferula, Sulfurirhabdus and Sulfuricella.
- Sterolibacteraceae comprises the genera Sterolibacterium, Sulfurisoma, Denitratisoma, Sulfuritalea, Georgfuchsia, Sulfurisoma and Methyloversatilis.

Members of the genus Nitrosomonas oxidize ammonium ions into nitrite, a process called nitrification, and are important in the nitrogen cycle. Other autotrophic genera such as Thiobacillus and Annwoodia oxidize reduced inorganic sulfur ions such as thiosulfate and sulfide into sulfate and have key roles in the sulfur cycle. Methylotrophs such as Methylophilus oxidize compounds such as methanol into carbon dioxide and are key to the carbon cycle. Gallionella and Ferriphaselus oxidise ferrous iron (Fe^{2+}) ions into ferric hydroxide (Fe(OH)_{3}) during autotrophic growth, and thus have roles in the carbon cycle and the iron cycle. As such, the Nitrosomonadales are critical to biogeochemical cycling of the elements and many species have key roles in principal biochemical processes.
