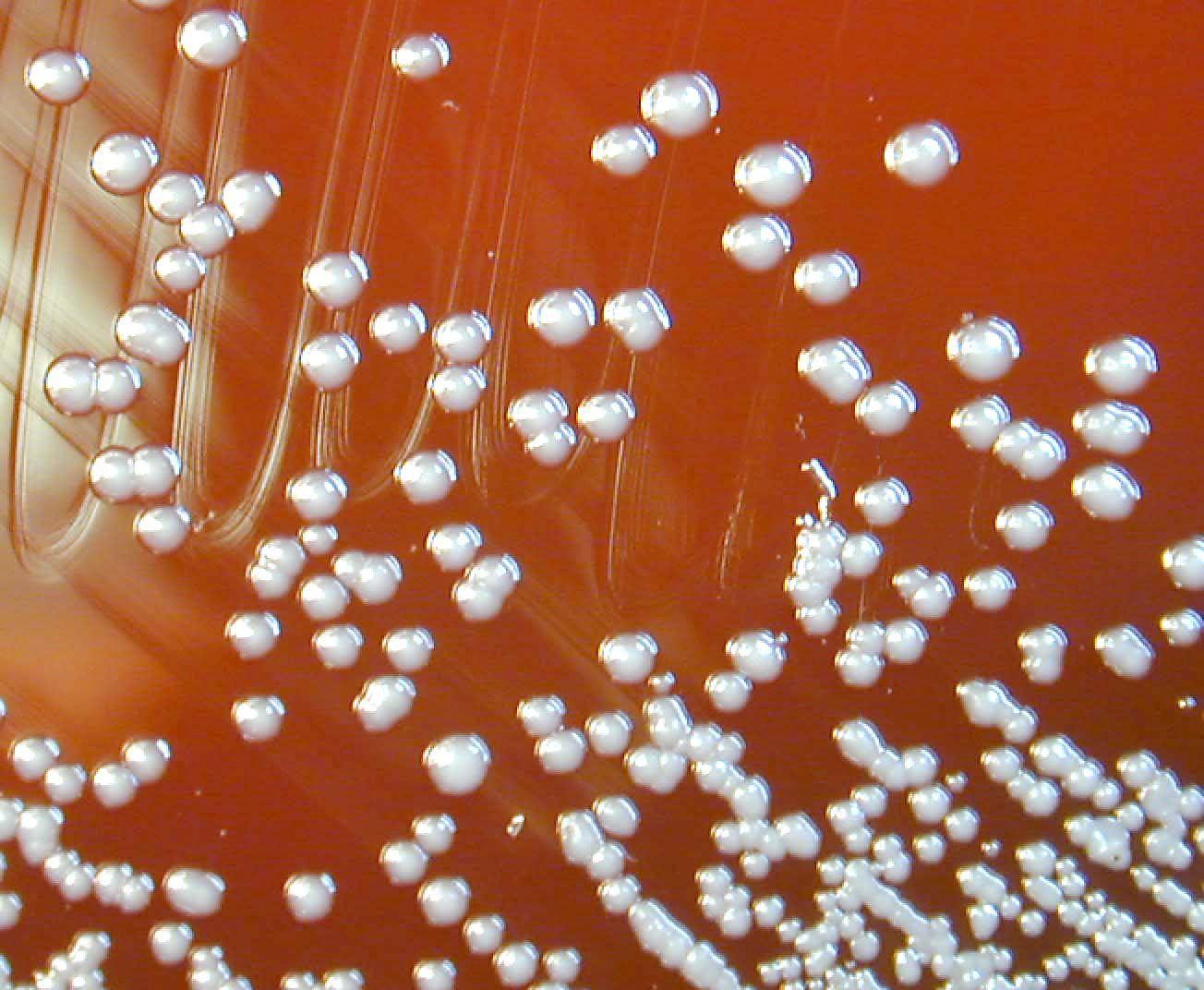
- Colonies of Burkholderia pseudomallei, one of many pathogenic Betaproteobacteria.

Scientific classification
- Domain: Bacteria
- Kingdom: Pseudomonadati
- Phylum: Pseudomonadota
- Class: Betaproteobacteria

Orders
- Burkholderiales; Ferritrophicales; Ferrovales; Neisseriales; Nitrosomonadales; Procabacteriales; Rhodocyclales

= Betaproteobacteria =

Class of bacteria

Betaproteobacteria are a class of Gram-negative bacteria, and one of the six classes of the phylum Pseudomonadota (synonym Proteobacteria).

== Metabolism ==
The Betaproteobacteria comprise over 75 genera and 400 species. Together, they represent a broad variety of metabolic strategies and occupy diverse environments, ranging from obligate pathogens living within host organisms to oligotrophic groundwater ecosystems. Whilst most members of the Betaproteobacteria are heterotrophic, deriving both their carbon and electrons from organocarbon sources, some are photoheterotrophic, deriving energy from light and carbon from organocarbon sources. Other genera are autotrophic, deriving their carbon from bicarbonate or carbon dioxide and their electrons from reduced inorganic ions such as nitrite, ammonium, thiosulfate or sulfide — many of these chemolithoautotrophic.

Betaproteobacteria are economically important, with roles in maintaining soil pH and in elementary cycling. Some economically important members of the Betaproteobacteria use nitrate as their terminal electron acceptor and can be used industrially to remove nitrate from wastewater by denitrification. A number of Betaproteobacteria are diazotrophs, meaning that they can fix molecular nitrogen from the air as their nitrogen source for growth – this is important to the farming industry as it is a primary means of ammonium levels in soils rising without the presence of leguminous plants.

== Phylogeny ==
The Betaproteobacteria are one of the eight classes that make up the Pseudomonadota ("Proteobacteria"). The Betaproteobacteria are most closely related to the Gammaproteobacteria, Acidithiobacillia and Hydrogenophilalia, which together make up a taxon which has previously been called "Chromatibacteria".

Four orders of Betaproteobacteria are currently recognised — the Burkholderiales, the Neisseriales, the Nitrosomonadales and the Rhodocyclales. The name "Procabacteriales" was also proposed for an order of endosymbionts of Acanthamoeba, but since they cannot be grown in culture and studies have been limited, the name has never been validly or effectively published, and thus is no more than a nickname without any standing in nomenclature.

An extensive reclassification of families and orders of the class based on a polyphasic analysis (including 16S rRNA gene analyses and 53-protein ribosomal protein concatamer analyses using the rMLST Multilocus sequence typing system) was published in 2017, that removed the order Hydrogenophilales from the class and into a novel class of the "Pseudomonadota", the Hydrogenophilalia. The same study also merged the former order Methylophilales into the Nitrosomonadales.

The four orders of the Betaproteobacteria are:

- Burkholderiales (type order) comprises the families Burkholderiacae (type family), Alcaliginaceae, Comamonadaceae, Oxalobacteraceae and Sutterellaceae. They exhibit a range of morphologies, including rods, curved rods, cocci, spirillae and multicellular 'tablets'. Both heterotrophs and photoheterotrophs are found along with some facultative autotrophs.
- Neisseriales comprises the families Neisseriaceae (type family) and Chromobacteriaceae. Their morphologies include cocci, curved rods, spirillae, rods, multicellular ribbons and filaments. Most are heterotrophs with some facultative methylotrophs and chemolithoheterotrophs.
- Nitrosomonadales comprises the families Nitrosomonadaceae (type family), Methylophilacae, Thiobacillaceae, Sterolibacteriacae, Spirillaceae and Gallionellaceae. Their morphologies include rods, spirillae and curved rods. Most are chemolithoautotrophs with some methylotrophs and heterotrophs
- Rhodocyclales comprises the families Rhodocyclaceae (type family), Azonexaceae, and Zoogloeaceae. Morphologies include rods, curved rods, rings, spirillae and cocci. Most species are heterotrophs with some photoheterotrophs and chemolithoautotrophs.

== Role in disease ==
Some members of the Betaproteobacteria can cause disease in various eukaryotic organisms, including humans. For example, Neisseria gonorrhoeae and Neisseria meningitidis cause gonorrhea and meningitis respectively, while Bordetella pertussis causes whooping cough. Other members of the class infect plants, such as Ralstonia solanacearum which causes bacterial wilt disease of over 250 plant species, Burkholderia cepacia which causes bulb rot in onions, and Xylophilus ampelinus which causes necrosis of grapevines.

== Economic importance ==
Betaproteobacteria play an important role in denitrification, removal of phosphorus, and xenobiotic degradation from waste. Various human activities, such as fertilizer production and chemical plant usage, release significant amounts of ammonium ions into rivers and oceans. Ammonium buildup in aquatic environments is potentially dangerous because high ammonium content can lead to eutrophication. Biological wastewater treatment systems, as well as other biological ammonium-removing methods, depend on the metabolism of various Bacteria including members of the Nitrosomonadales of the Betaproteobacteria that perform nitrification to remove excessive ammonia from wastewater. The ammonia is first oxidized into nitrite, further oxidized to nitrate. A variety of other organisms then reduces nitrate into molecular nitrogen gas (denitrification), which leaves the ecosystem and is carried into the atmosphere.

== See also ==
- Acidithiobacillia
- Gammaproteobacteria
- Hydrogenophilalia
