= Cyc2 =

Cyc2 may refer to:

- Iron:rusticyanin reductase, an enzyme
- Terpentetriene synthase, an enzyme
