= Nitrate reductase (disambiguation) =

Nitrate reductases are enzymes that reduce nitrate to nitrite.

Nitrate reductase may also refer to:

- Nitrate reductase (cytochrome)
- Nitrate reductase (NADH)
- Nitrate reductase (NADPH)
- Nitrate reductase (NAD(P)H)
- Nitrate reductase (quinone)

== See also ==
- Nitrite reductase (disambiguation)
