= Stellacyanin =

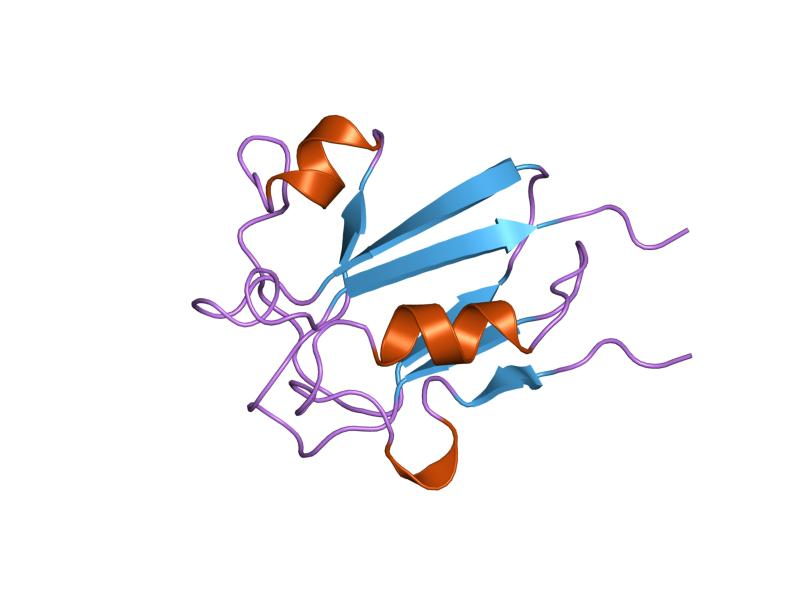
3D structure of Stellacyanin

Stellacyanin is a member of the blue or type I copper protein family. This family of copper proteins is generally involved in electron transfer reactions with the Cu center transitioning between the oxidized Cu(II) form and the reduced Cu(I) form. Stellacyanin is ubiquitous among vascular seed plants.

== Structure ==
Stellacyanin’s spectroscopic properties help us differentiate it from plastocyanin, which is another monocopper blue protein found in plants. It is a 20kDa protein whose structure is made up of beta strands forming two beta sheets to form a Greek key beta barrel with variable alpha helical structure. The copper binding domain of the protein is located at the amino-terminal end, while the carboxyl-terminal end is rich in hydroxyproline and serine residues, typical of proteins associated with cell walls of plants. In addition, it is also heavily glycosylated. The copper is tetrahedrally coordinated by a cysteine, 2 histidines, and a glutamine residue. The glutamine residue takes place of a methionine ligand typically found in other blue copper proteins. In addition, electron transfer rates for stellacyanin are faster than for other type I copper proteins suggesting stellacyanin is more solvent accessible at the active site. The exact function of stellacyanin is unknown. However, given the fact that type I copper proteins are involved in electron transfer and stellacyanin appears to be associated with the plant cell wall, it is suggested that it is involved in oxidative cross-linking reactions to build polymeric material making up the cell wall. Cell wall structural glycoproteins contain hydroxyproline and serine-rich sequence domains which are found in stellacyanins.

== Stellacyanin reduction potential ==
Stellacyanins are characterized by their uniquely low redox potentials, as low as +180 mv and reach up to +280 mV. Other blue copper protein redox potentials start around +310 mV and reach up to +680 mV. A mutant cucumber stellacyanin was created by replacing the glutamine axial ligand (a ligand which all other blue proteins contain) with a methionine (Q99M) and purified. This was achieved through Polymerase Chain Reaction (PCR). The mutated stellacyanin calculated redox potential was +420 mV, which much higher than the redox potential of the stellacyanin found in nature (without methionine) at +260 mV. Stellacyanins are most involved in redox reactions of plants that take place during a defense response, and formation of lignin.
