= Respiratory nitrate reductase =

Respiratory nitrate reductase may refer to:

- Nitrate reductase (cytochrome)
- Nitrate reductase
