= Nitrite reductase (disambiguation) =

Nitrite reductase refers to any of several classes of enzymes that catalyze the reduction of nitrite.

Nitrite reductase may also refer to:

- Nitrite reductase (NO-forming)
- Nitrite reductase (NAD(P)H)

== See also ==
- Cytochrome c nitrite reductase
- Ferredoxin—nitrite reductase
- Nitrate reductase (disambiguation)
