= Cytochrome c assembly protein family =

Cytochrome C assembly protein

Identifiers
- Symbol: Cytochrom_C_asm
- Pfam: PF01578
- Pfam clan: CL0328
- InterPro: IPR002541
- TCDB: 9.B.14
Available protein structures:
- Pfam: structures / ECOD
- PDB: RCSB PDB; PDBe; PDBj
- PDBsum: structure summary

In molecular biology, the cytochrome c assembly protein family includes various proteins involved in cytochrome c assembly from mitochondria and bacteria. Members of this family include: CycK from Rhizobium leguminosarum, CcmC from Escherichia coli and Paracoccus denitrificans, and orf240 from Triticum aestivum (Wheat) mitochondria. The members of this family are probably integral membrane proteins with six predicted transmembrane helices that may comprise the membrane component of an ABC (ATP binding cassette) transporter complex. This transporter may be necessary for transport of some component needed for cytochrome c assembly. One member, R. leguminosarum CycK, contains a putative haem-binding motif. Wheat orf240 also contains a putative haem-binding motif and is a proposed ABC transporter with c-type haem as its proposed substrate. However it seems unlikely that all members of this family transport haem or c-type apocytochromes because P. denitrificans CcmC transports neither.
