= Mixotroph =

Organism that can use a mix of different sources of energy and carbon

A mixotroph is an organism that uses a mix of different sources of energy and carbon, instead of having a single trophic mode. Mixotrophs are situated somewhere on the continuum from complete autotrophy to complete heterotrophy. It is estimated that mixotrophs comprise more than half of all microscopic plankton. There are two types of eukaryotic mixotrophs. There are those with their own chloroplasts – including those with endosymbionts providing the chloroplasts. And there are those that acquire them through kleptoplasty, or through symbiotic associations with prey, or through 'enslavement' of the prey's organelles.

Possible combinations include photo- and chemotrophy, besides litho- and organotrophy, the latter including osmotrophy, phagotrophy and myzocytosis. Mixotrophs can be either eukaryotic or prokaryotic. Mixotrophs can take advantage of different environmental conditions.

A given trophic mode of a mixotroph organism is called obligate when it is indispensable for its growth and maintenance; a trophic mode is facultative when used as a supplemental source. Some organisms have incomplete Calvin cycles, so that they are incapable of fixing carbon dioxide and must use organic carbon sources.

== Obligate or facultative ==
Organisms may employ mixotrophy obligately or facultatively.

- Obligate mixotrophy: To support growth and maintenance, an organism must utilize both heterotrophic and autotrophic means.
- Obligate autotrophy with facultative heterotrophy: Autotrophy alone is sufficient for growth and maintenance, but heterotrophy may be used as a supplementary strategy when autotrophic energy is not enough, for example, when light intensity is low.
- Facultative autotrophy with obligate heterotrophy: Heterotrophy is sufficient for growth and maintenance, but autotrophy may be used to supplement, for example, when prey availability is very low.
- Facultative mixotrophy: Maintenance and growth may be obtained by heterotrophic or autotrophic means alone, and mixotrophy is used only when necessary.

== Plants ==
A mixotrophic plant using mycorrhizal fungi to obtain photosynthesis products from other plants

Amongst plants, mixotrophy classically applies to carnivorous, hemi-parasitic and myco-heterotrophic species. However, this characterisation as mixotrophic could be extended to a higher number of clades as research demonstrates that organic forms of nitrogen and phosphorus—such as DNA, proteins, amino-acids or carbohydrates—are also part of the nutrient supplies of a number of plant species.

Mycoheterotrophic plants form symbiotic relationships with mycorrhizal fungi, which provide them with organic carbon and nutrients from nearby photosynthetic plants or soil. They often lack chlorophyll or have reduced photosynthetic capacity. An example is Indian pipe, a white, non-photosynthetic plant that relies heavily on fungal networks for nutrients. Pinesap also taps into fungal networks for sustenance, similar to Indian pipe. Certain orchids, such as Corallorhiza, depend on fungi for carbon and nutrients while developing photosynthetic capabilities (especially in their early stages).

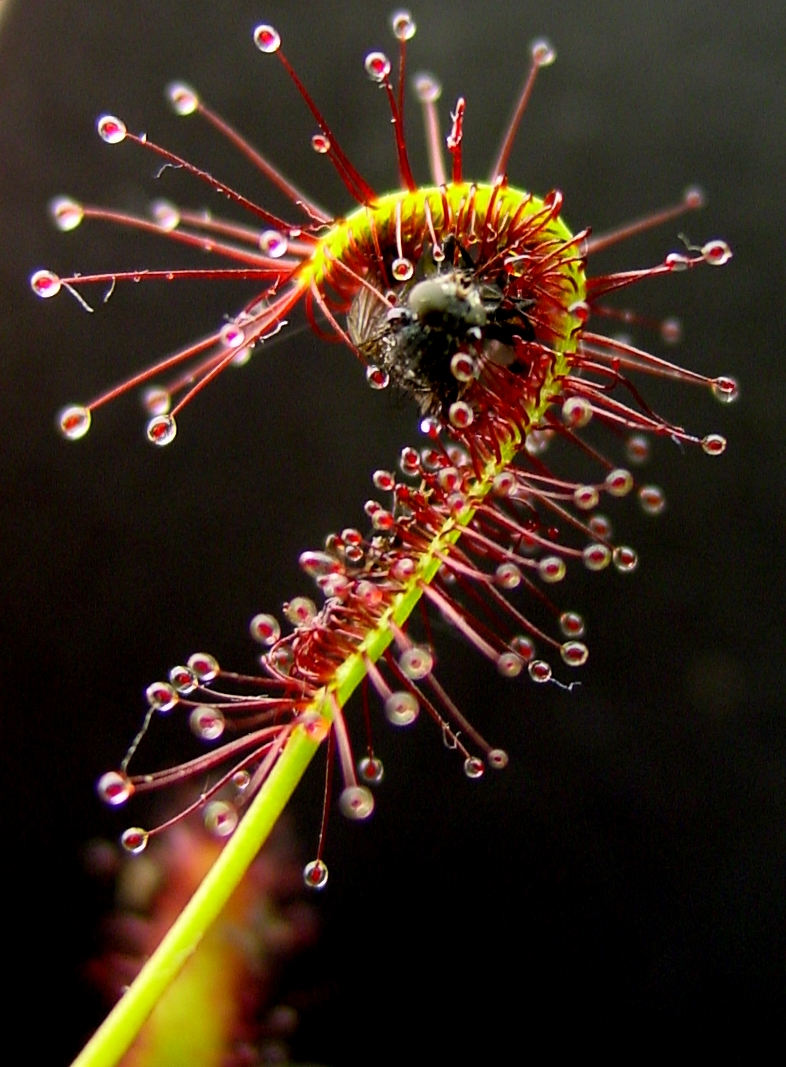
The leaf of a carnivorous plant, Drosera capensis, bending in response to the trapping of an insect

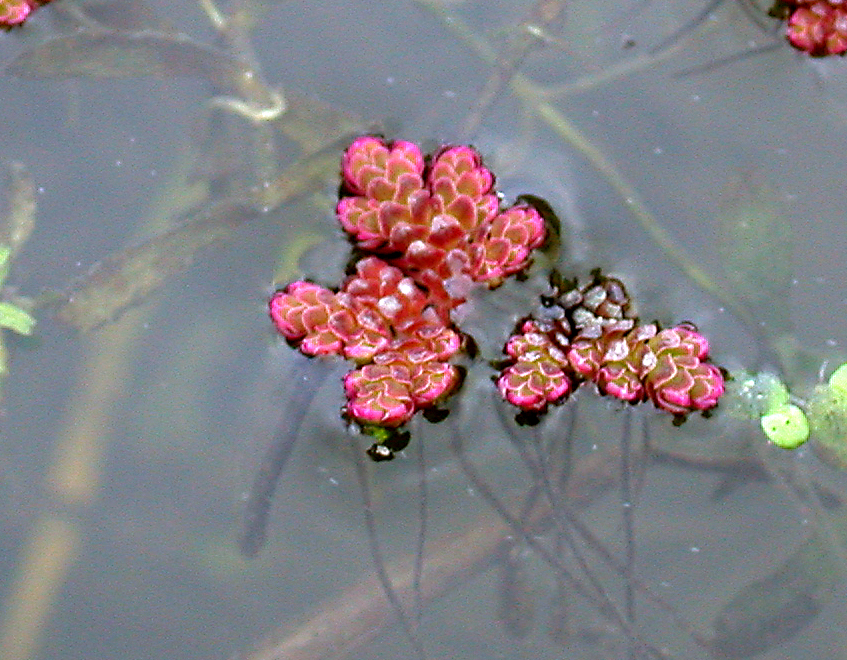
The floating fern Azolla filiculoides hosts a nitrogen-fixing cyanobacteria.

Carnivorous plants are plants that derive some or most of their nutrients from trapping and consuming animals or protozoans, typically insects and other arthropods, and occasionally small mammals and birds. They have adapted to grow in waterlogged sunny places where the soil is thin or poor in nutrients, especially nitrogen, such as acidic bogs.

Hemiparasitic plants are partially parasitic, attaching to the roots or stems of host plants to extract water, nutrients, or organic compounds while still performing photosynthesis. Examples are mistletoe (absorbs water and nutrients from host trees but also photosynthesizes), Indian paintbrush (connects to the roots of other plants for nutrients while maintaining photosynthetic leaves), and Yellow rattle (a root parasite that supplements its nutrition by tapping into host plants).

Some epiphytic plants, which are plants that grow on other plants, absorb organic matter, such as decaying debris or animal waste, through specialized structures while still photosynthesizing. For example, some bromeliads have tank-like leaf structures that collect water and organic debris, absorbing nutrients through their leaves. Also, some epiphytic orchids absorb nutrients from organic matter caught in their aerial roots.

Some plants incorporate algae or cyanobacteria, which provide photosynthetically derived carbon, while the plant also absorbs external nutrients. For example, Azolla filiculoides, is a floating fern that hosts the nitrogen-fixing cyanobacteria Anabaena in its leaves, supplementing nutrient intake while photosynthesizing. This has led to the plant being dubbed a "super-plant", as it can readily colonise areas of freshwater, and grow at great speed - doubling its biomass in as little as 1.9 days.

== Animals ==
Mixotrophy is less common among animals than among plants and microbes, but there are many examples of mixotrophic invertebrates and at least one example of a mixotrophic vertebrate.

- The spotted salamander, Ambystoma maculatum, also hosts microalgae within its cells. Its embryos have been found to have symbiotic algae living inside them, the only known example of vertebrate cells hosting an endosymbiont microbe (unless mitochondria is considered).
- Zoochlorella is a nomen rejiciendum for a genus of green algae assigned to Chlorella. The term zoochlorella (plural zoochlorellae) is sometimes used to refer to any green algae that lives symbiotically within the body of a freshwater or marine invertebrate or protozoan.
- Reef-building corals (Scleractinia), like many other cnidarians (e.g. jellyfish, anemones), host endosymbiotic microalgae within their cells, thus making them mixotrophs.
- The Oriental hornet, Vespa orientalis, can obtain energy from sunlight absorbed by its cuticle. It thus contrasts with the other animals listed here, which are mixotrophic with the help of endosymbionts.
- The Leaf sheep, Costasiella kuroshimae, retains chloroplasts from algae it consumes so it can supplement its diet with photosynthesis via kleptoplasty
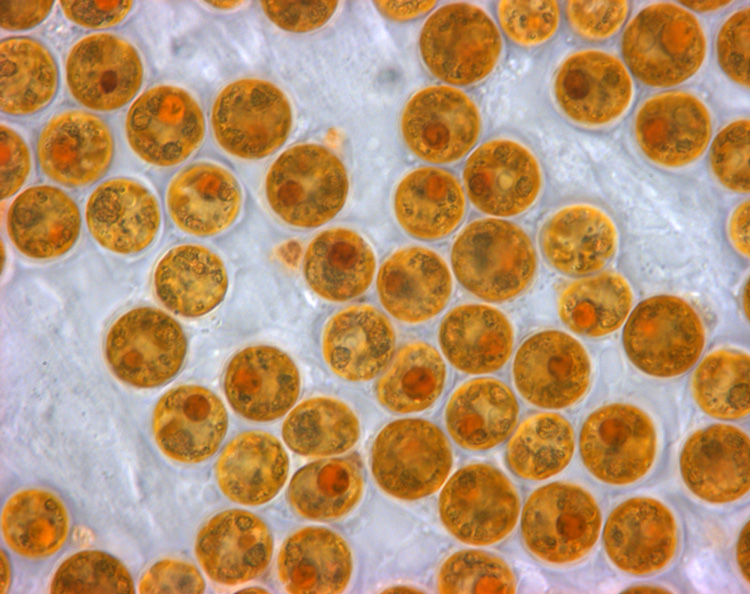
Zooxanthellae is a photosynthetic algae that lives inside hosts like coral.

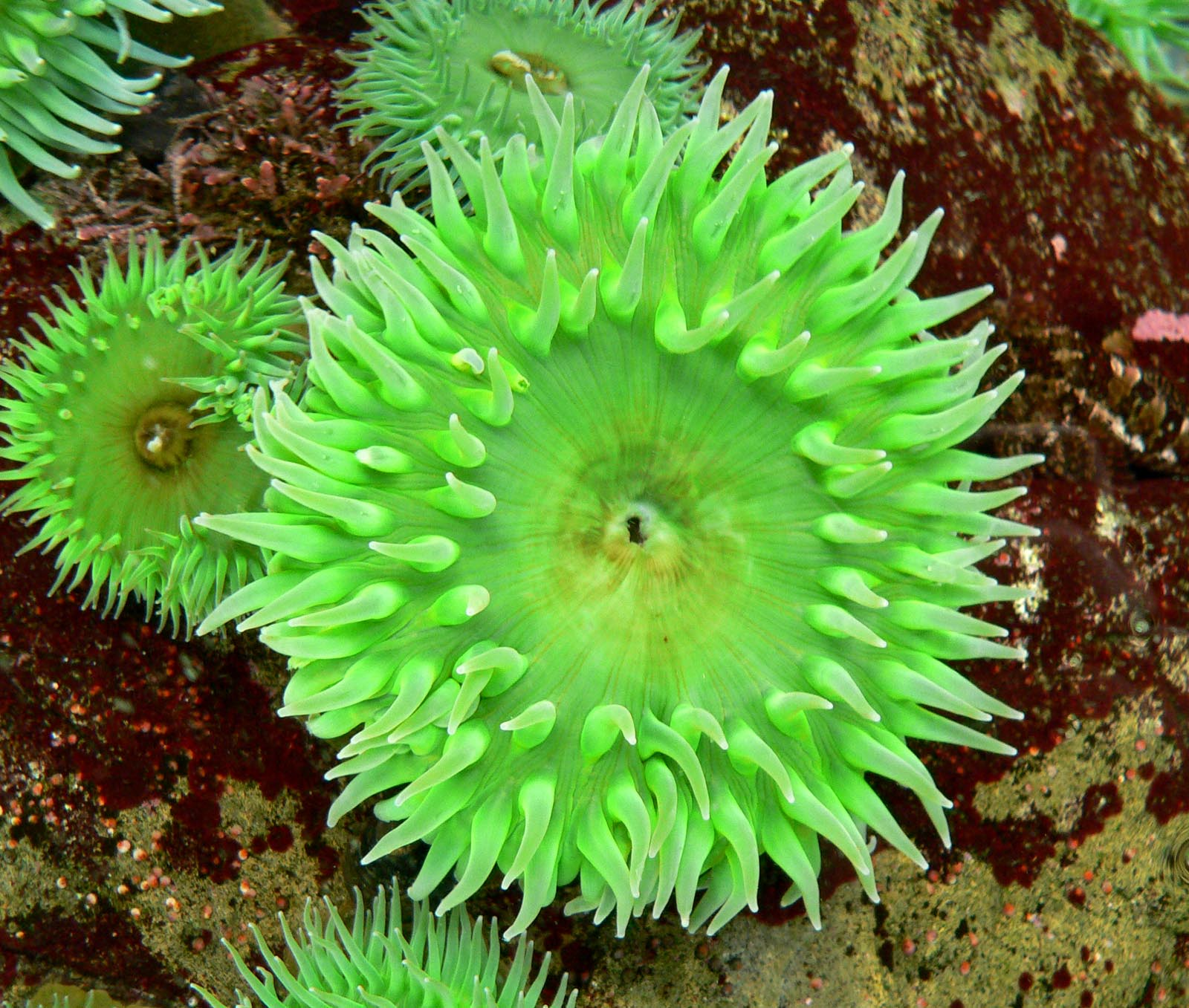
Anthopleura xanthogrammica gains its green colour from Zoochlorella.

The spotted jelly, a mixotrophic jellyfish, lives in trophic mutualism with zooxanthella, a unicellular organism capable of photosynthesis.

== Microorganisms ==
=== Bacteria and archaea ===
- Paracoccus pantotrophus is a bacterium that can live chemoorganoheterotrophically, whereby many organic compounds can be metabolized. Also, a facultative chemolithoautotrophic metabolism is possible, as seen in colorless sulfur bacteria (some Thiobacillus), whereby sulfur compounds such as hydrogen sulfide, elemental sulfur, or thiosulfate are oxidized to sulfate. The sulfur compounds serve as electron donors and are consumed to produce ATP. The carbon source for these organisms can be carbon dioxide (autotrophy) or organic carbon (heterotrophy).
  Organoheterotrophy can occur under aerobic or under anaerobic conditions; lithoautotrophy takes place aerobically.

=== Classifying protists ===
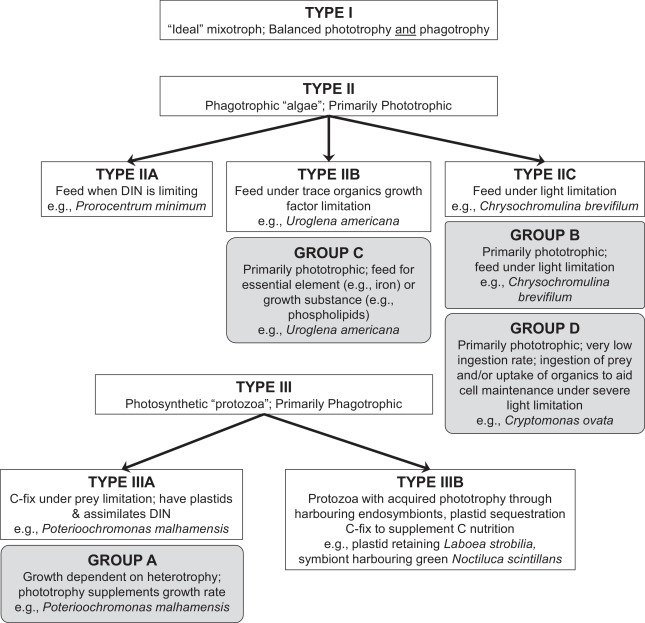
Traditional classification of mixotrophic protists In this diagram, types in open boxes as proposed by Stoecker have been aligned against groups in grey boxes as proposed by Jones. DIN = dissolved inorganic nutrients

Several categorization schemes have been suggested to characterize sub-domains within mixotrophy.

==== Phototrophy verses phagotrophy ====
Consider the example of a marine protist with heterotrophic and photosynthetic capabilities: In the breakdown put forward by Jones, there are four mixotrophic groups based on relative roles of phagotrophy and phototrophy.

- A: Heterotrophy (phagotrophy) is the norm, and phototrophy is only used when prey concentrations are limiting.
- B: Phototrophy is the dominant strategy, and phagotrophy is employed as a supplement when light is limiting.
- C: Phototrophy results in substances for both growth and ingestion; phagotrophy is employed when light is limiting.
- D: Phototrophy is most common nutrition type, phagotrophy only used during prolonged dark periods, when light is extremely limiting.

==== By efficiency ====
An alternative scheme by Stoeker also takes into account the role of nutrients and growth factors, and includes mixotrophs that have a photosynthetic symbiont or who retain chloroplasts from their prey. This scheme characterizes mixotrophs by their efficiency.

- Type 1: "Ideal mixotrophs" that use prey and sunlight equally well
- Type 2: Supplement phototrophic activity with food consumption
- Type 3: Primarily heterotrophic, use phototrophic activity during times of very low prey abundance.

==== Constitutive mixotrophs ====
Another scheme, proposed by Mitra et al., specifically classifies marine planktonic mixotrophs so that mixotrophy can be included in ecosystem modeling. This scheme classified organisms as:

- Constitutive mixotrophs (CMs): phagotrophic organisms that are inherently able also to photosynthesize
- Non-constitutive mixotrophs (NCMs): phagotrophic organisms that must ingest prey to attain the ability to photosynthesize. NCMs are further broken down into:
  - Specific non-constitutive mixotrophs (SNCMs), which only gain the ability to photosynthesize from a specific prey item (either by retaining plastids only in kleptoplastidy or by retaining whole prey cells in endosymbiosis)
  - General non-constitutive mixotrophs (GNCM), which can gain the ability to photosynthesize from a variety of prey items

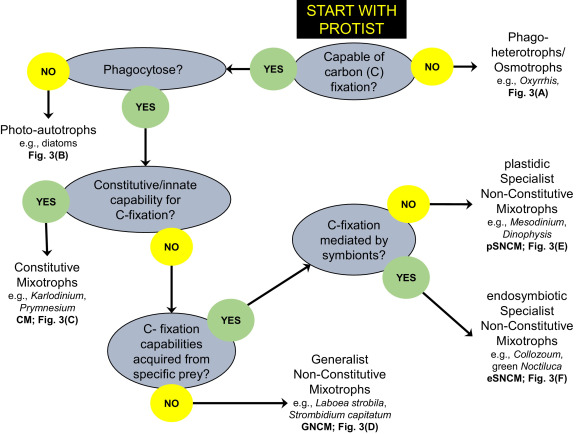
Pathways used by Mitra et al. to derive functional groups of planktonic protists

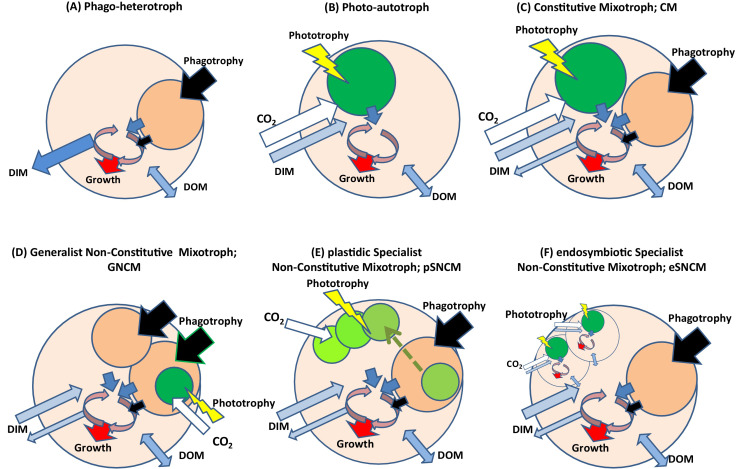
Levels in complexity among those different types of protists, according to Mitra et al.
(A) phagotrophic (no phototrophy); (B) phototrophic (no phagotrophy); (C) constitutive mixotroph, with innate capacity for phototrophy; (D) generalist non-constitutive mixotroph acquiring photosystems from different phototrophic prey; (E) specialist non-constitutive mixotroph acquiring plastids from a specific prey type; (F) specialist non-constitutive mixotroph acquiring photosystems from endosymbionts. DIM = dissolved inorganic material (ammonium, phosphate etc.). DOM = dissolved organic material

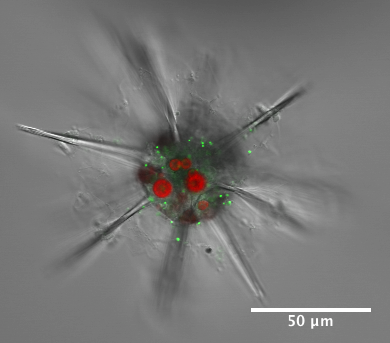
Acantharian radiolarian hosts Phaeocystis symbionts.

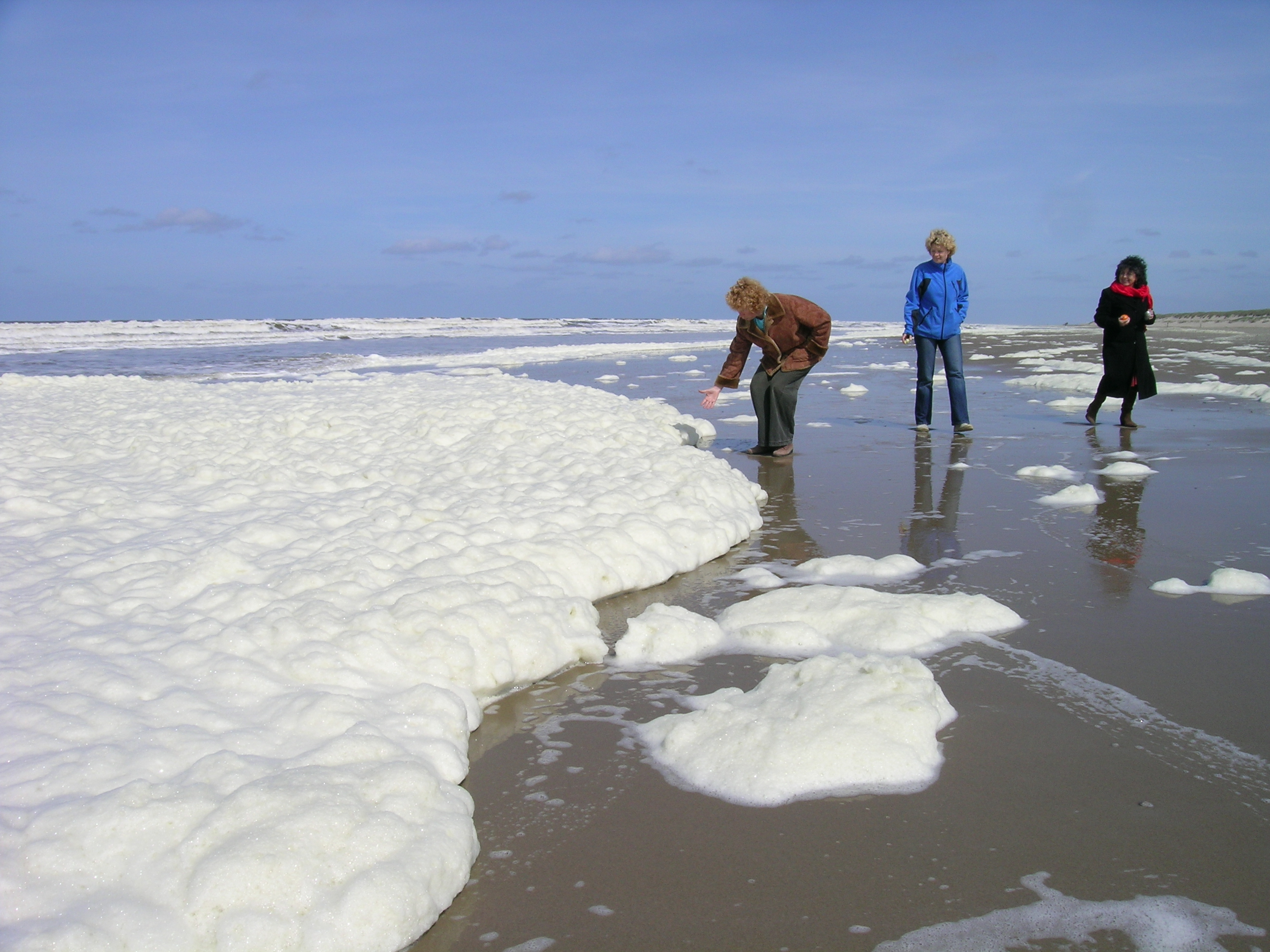
White Phaeocystis algal foam washing up on a beach

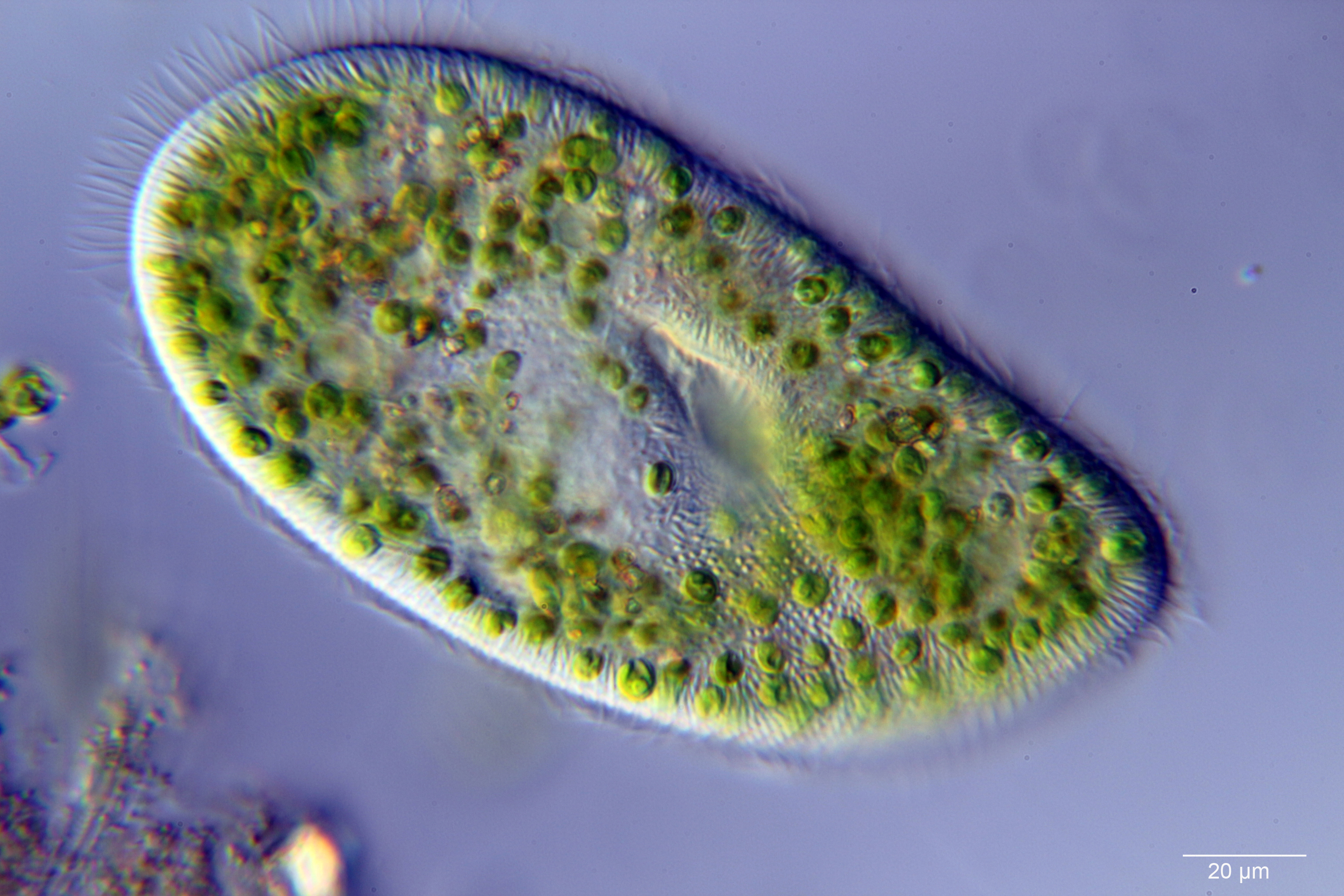
A single-celled ciliate with green zoochlorellae living inside endosymbiotically

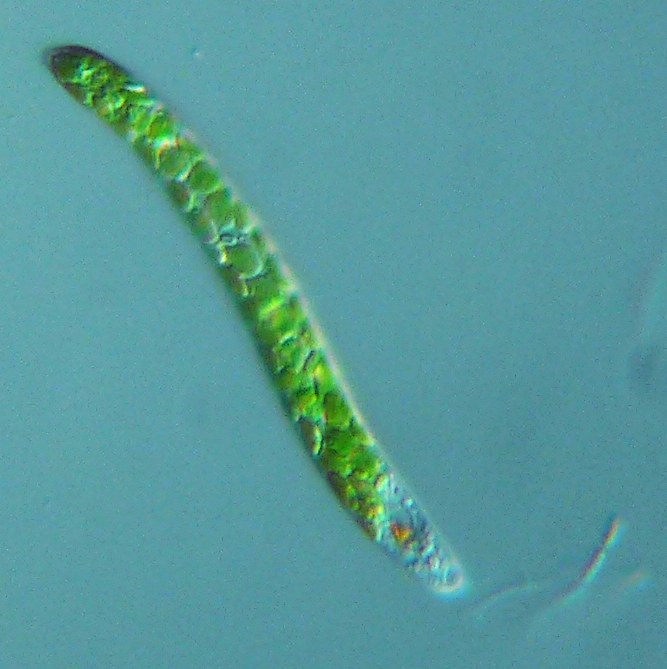
Euglena mutabilis, a photosynthetic flagellate

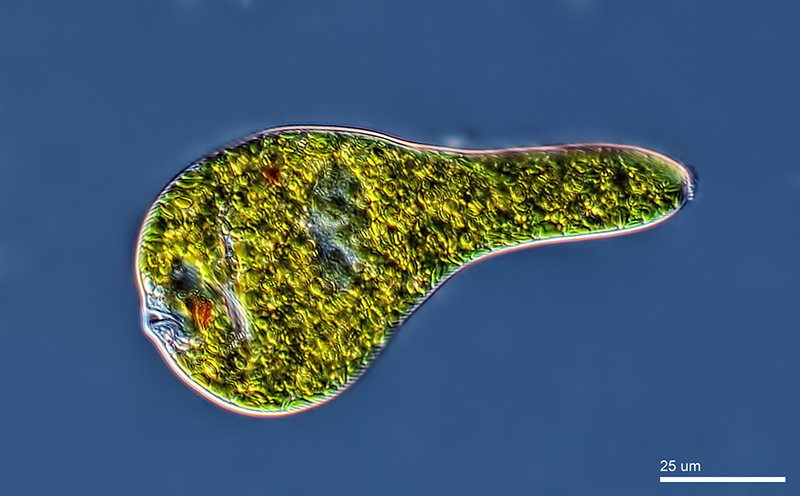
Euglenoid

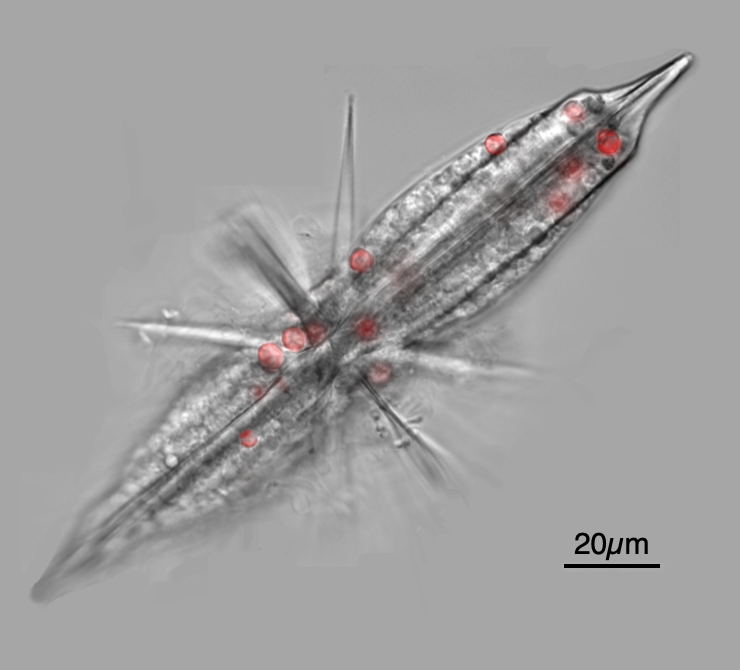
Fluorescent micrograph of an acantharian with Phaeocystis symbionts fluorescing red (chlorophyll)

== Marine food webs ==
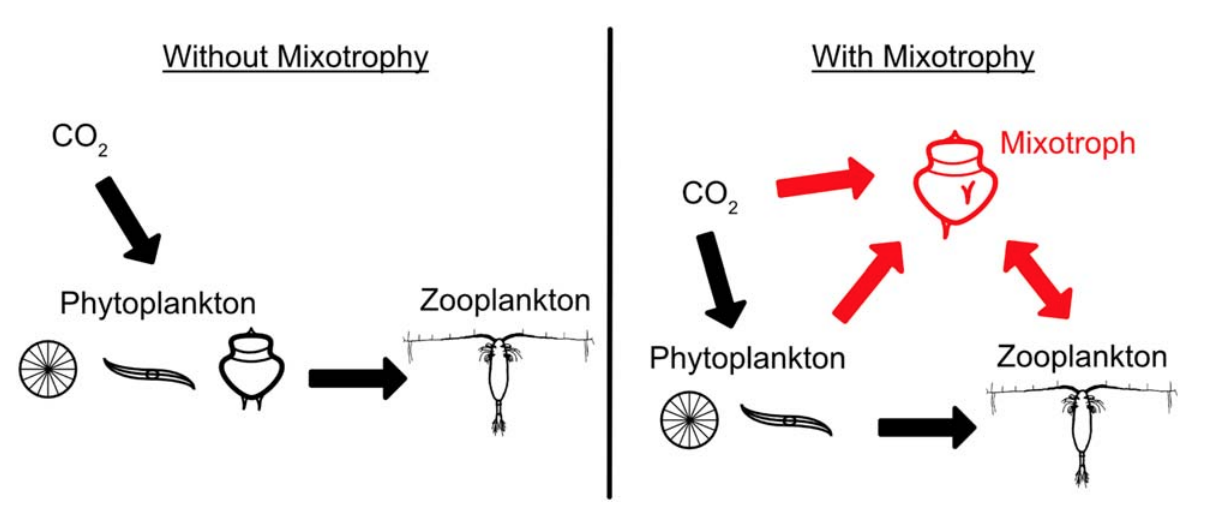
The red arrows indicate additional trophic interactions that can occur when mixotrophy is present

Mixotrophs are especially common in marine environments, where the levels of energy from the sun and nutrients in the water can vary greatly. For example, in nutrient-poor (oligotrophic) waters, mixotrophic phytoplankton supplement their diet by consuming bacteria.

The effects of mixotrophy on organic and inorganic carbon pools introduce a metabolic plasticity which blurs the lines between producers and consumers. Prior to the discovery of mixotrophs, it was thought that only organisms with chloroplasts were capable of photosynthesis and vice versa. This additional functional group of plankton, capable of both phototrophy and phagotrophy, provides a further boost in the biomass and energy transfer to higher trophic levels.

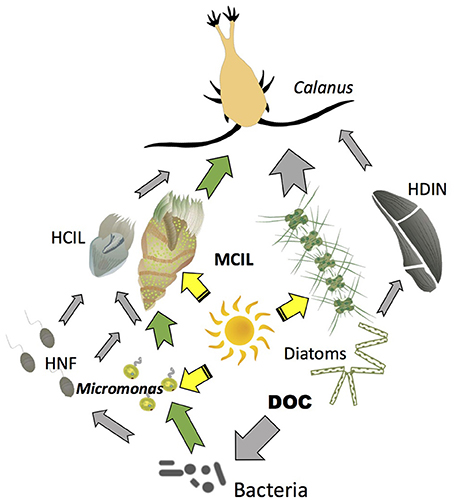
Arctic food web with mixotrophy: Yellow arrows indicate flow of energy from the sun to photosynthetic organisms (autotrophs and mixotrophs). Gray arrows indicate flow of carbon to heterotrophs; Green arrows indicate major pathways of carbon flow to or from mixotrophs. HCIL, Strictly heterotrophic ciliates; MCIL, Mixotrophic ciliates; HNF, Heterotrophic nanoflagellates; DOC, Dissolved organic carbon; HDIN, Heterotrophic dinoflagellates.

== See also ==
- Primary nutritional groups
- Photosynthesis
