= Plastocyanin family of copper-binding proteins =

Copper binding proteins, plastocyanin/azurin family
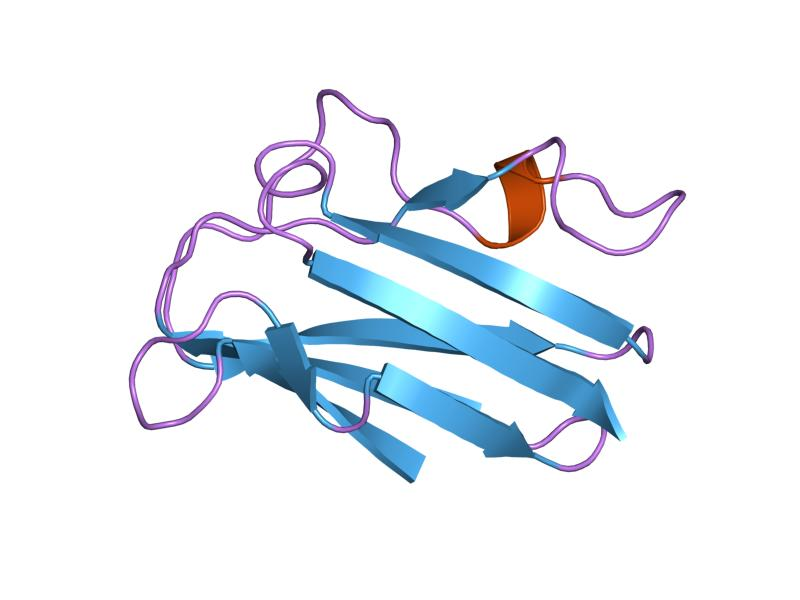
- Structure of poplar plastocyanin.

Identifiers
- Symbol: Copper-bind
- Pfam: PF00127
- InterPro: IPR000923
- PROSITE: PDOC00174
- SCOP2: 1plc / SCOPe / SUPFAM
- OPM superfamily: 93
- OPM protein: 1sfd
- CDD: cd00920
Available protein structures:
- PDB: IPR000923 PF00127 (ECOD; PDBsum)
- AlphaFold: IPR000923; PF00127

Plastocyanin/azurin family of copper-binding proteins (or blue (type 1) copper domain) is a family of small proteins that bind a single copper atom and that are characterised by an intense electronic absorption band near 600 nm (see copper proteins). The most well-known members of this class of proteins are the plant chloroplastic plastocyanins, which exchange electrons with cytochrome c6, and the distantly related bacterial azurins, which exchange electrons with cytochrome c551. This family of proteins also includes amicyanin from bacteria such as Methylobacterium extorquens or Paracoccus versutus (Thiobacillus versutus) that can grow on methylamine; auracyanins A and B from Chloroflexus aurantiacus; blue copper protein from Alcaligenes faecalis; cupredoxin (CPC) from Cucumis sativus (Cucumber) peelings; cusacyanin (basic blue protein; plantacyanin, CBP) from cucumber; halocyanin from Natronomonas pharaonis (Natronobacterium pharaonis), a membrane-associated copper-binding protein; pseudoazurin from Pseudomonas; rusticyanin from Thiobacillus ferrooxidans; stellacyanin from Rhus vernicifera (Japanese lacquer tree); umecyanin from the roots of Armoracia rusticana (Horseradish); and allergen Ra3 from ragweed. This pollen protein has evolutary relation to the above proteins, but seems to have lost the ability to bind copper. Although there is an appreciable amount of divergence in the sequences of all these proteins, the copper ligand sites are conserved.
