= Glycine—oxaloacetate transaminase =

Glycine-oxaloacetate transaminase

Identifiers
- EC no.: 2.6.1.35
- CAS no.: 37277-90-0

Databases
- IntEnz: IntEnz view
- BRENDA: BRENDA entry
- ExPASy: NiceZyme view
- KEGG: KEGG entry
- MetaCyc: metabolic pathway
- PRIAM: profile
- PDB structures: RCSB PDB PDBe PDBsum
- Gene Ontology: AmiGO / QuickGO
Search
- PMC: articles
- PubMed: articles
- NCBI: proteins

Glycine-oxaloacetate transaminase (EC 2.6.1.35) is an enzyme characterised from Micrococcus denitrificans that catalyzes a reversible chemical reaction that interconverts glycine and oxaloacetic acid with glyoxylic acid and L-aspartic acid.

glycine
+
oxaloacetic acid
glyoxylic acid
+
aspartic acid

This enzyme is a transferase, specifically a transaminase, which transfer nitrogenous groups. The systematic name of this enzyme class is glycine:oxaloacetate aminotransferase. It is also called glycine-oxaloacetate aminotransferase. It uses pyridoxal phosphate as a cofactor.
