= Methylamine dehydrogenase (amicyanin) =

Identifiers
- EC no.: 1.4.9.1

Databases
- IntEnz: IntEnz view
- BRENDA: BRENDA entry
- ExPASy: NiceZyme view
- KEGG: KEGG entry
- MetaCyc: metabolic pathway
- PRIAM: profile
- PDB structures: RCSB PDB PDBe PDBsum
Search
- PMC: articles
- PubMed: articles
- NCBI: proteins

Methylamine dehydrogenase (amicyanin) (EC 1.4.9.1, MADH, amine dehydrogenase, primary-amine dehydrogenase, methylamine:amicyanin oxidoreductase (deaminating)) catalyzes the reduction of copper-dependent electron-carrier amicyanin via oxidation of methylamine to formaldehyde.

methylamine
+ amicyanin
H_{2}O
NH^{+}_{4}
formaldehyde
+
reduced
amicyanin

This reaction requires the post-translational formation of a tryptophan tryptophylquinone (TTQ) cofactor. MADH forms a tetramer of two light-chain and two heavy-chain protomers. The TTQ cofactor is located in the light-chain and is formed from oxidative coupling between Trp57 and Trp108 (Paracoccus denitrificans numbering) catalyzed by the diheme enzyme MauG.

In P. denitrificans, methylamine dehydrogenase transiently forms a ternary complex to catalyze methylamine-dependent cytochrome c-551i reduction. Within this complex, electrons are transferred from the TTQ cofactor of MADH to the Type 1 copper center of amicyanin, and then to the heme of the cytochrome.
