= Azurin =

Copper metalloprotein

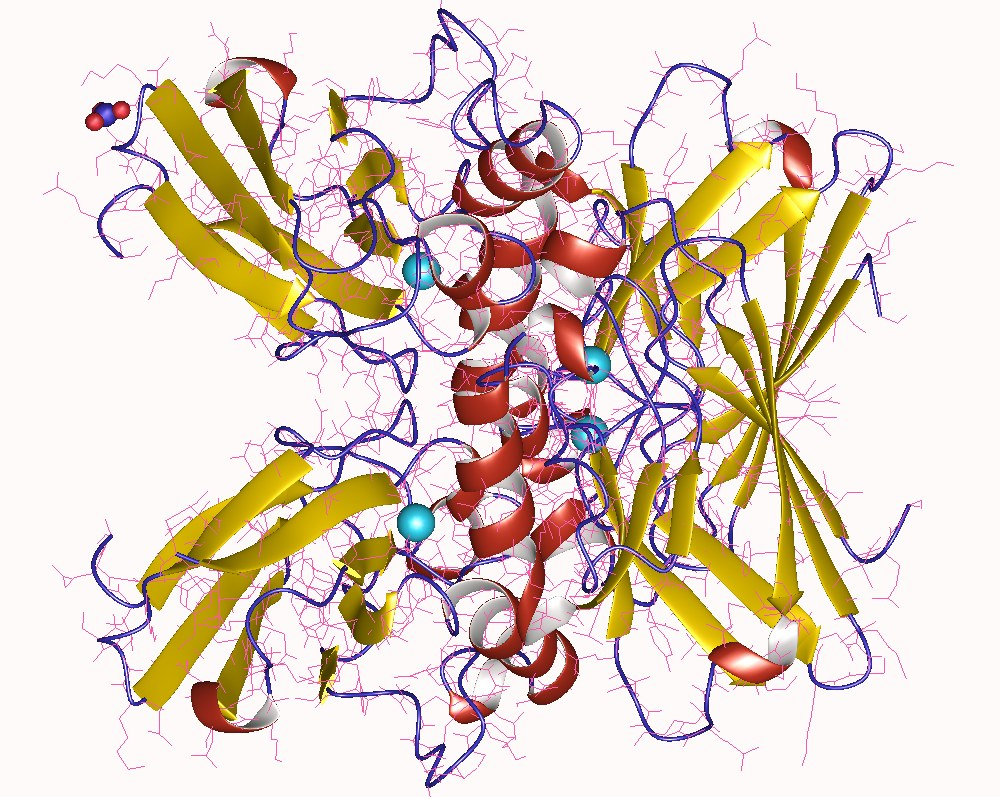
- Azurin tetramer, Pseudomonas aeruginosa

Identifiers
- Symbol: Copper-bind
- Pfam: PF00127
- SCOP2: 5azu / SCOPe / SUPFAM
- CDD: cd13922
Available protein structures:
- PDB: PF00127 (ECOD; PDBsum)
- AlphaFold: PF00127

Azurin is a small, periplasmic, bacterial blue copper protein found in Pseudomonas, Bordetella, or Alcaligenes bacteria. Azurin moderates single-electron transfer between enzymes associated with the cytochrome chain by undergoing oxidation-reduction between Cu(I) and Cu(II). Each monomer of an azurin tetramer has a molecular weight of approximately 14kDa, contains a single copper atom, is intensively blue, and has a fluorescence emission band centered at 308 nm.

Azurins and pseudoazurins participate in the denitrification processes in bacteria., including the gram-negative bacteria Pseudomonas aeruginosa, by interacting with cytochrome c551. Azurin from P aeruginosa is a type I blue copper protein (cupredoxin), while cytochrome c551 (9 kDa) is a haem-containing cytochrome. Azurin possesses a relatively large hydrophobic patch close to the active site, and two residues in this hydrophobic patch, Met-44 and Met-64, are believed to be involved in its interaction with the redox partners cytochrome c551 and nitrite reductase.

Although unrelated to its electron-transfer property, azurin has been found to have anticancer properties through its interaction with tumor-suppressor protein p53.

== Protein function ==
In its oxidized form, azurin (Cu^{2+}Az) receives an electron from its redox partner and is reduced according to the following reaction:

Cu^{2+}Az + e^{−} → Cu^{+}Az

The redox potential is 310 mV.

The highly interconnected beta-sheet structure of azurin is strongly coupled with its electron-transfer center (the copper-binding side). Considerable experimental evidence exists to suggest that hydrogen bonds play a role in the long-distance electron transfer mechanism of azurin. Taken together, these observations suggest that electrons tunnel through the protein along its polypeptide and hydrogen bonds, making azurin a useful model system for studying long-range, intraprotein electron transfer (LRET).

== Protein structure ==
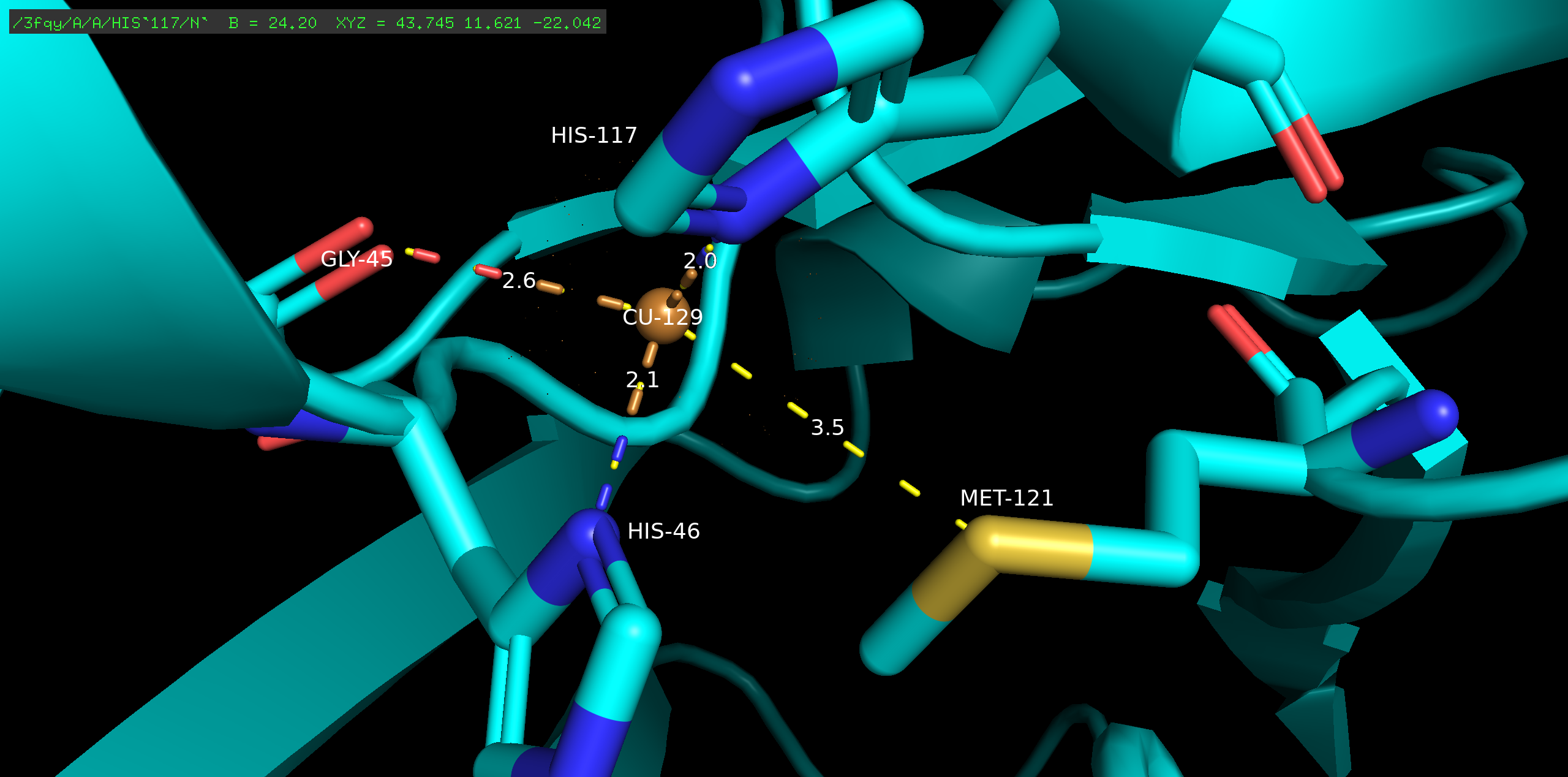
The copper binding domain of azurin rendered in PyMol, with four of the five copper-binding ligands labeled. The distance (in angstroms) from the copper atom to each individual ligand has been recorded.

Azurin is a monomeric protein that weighs approximately 14 kDa and is composed of 128 amino acids forming eight beta-strands arranged in a beta-barrel formation. The strands are connected by turns and a single alpha-helical insertion. A single-atom copper binding site is located about 7 Å below each monomer's surface towards its northern end; the copper atom that inhabits it is coordinated by five ligands surrounded by an extensive hydrophobic patch.

The three equatorial copper ligands are composed of a thiolate (Cys112) and two imidazoles (His46, His117), and the carbonyl oxygen atoms of Gly45 and Met121 serve as the two weak axial ligands. With the exception of Gly45, the copper-binding configuration above is common to the structures of all blue type 1 copper-binding proteins determined thus far. Once coordinated, the ligand-metal complex assumes a distorted, trigonal bi-pyramidal geometry that stabilizes the cuprous (Cu(I)) reduced state of the protein relative to the cupric (Cu(II)) oxidized state. Structurally imposed backbonding between the copper d orbitals and its ligand p orbitals may further stabilize the cuprous state.

Existing structural information about azurin has largely been derived from X-ray crystallography studies of single-site mutated forms of the protein. Notable structural features elucidated by crystallography include the beta-sandwich motif formed from eight interlocking beta strands, as well as an alpha-helical segment outside the barrel linking beta-sheets 4 and 5.

Although the Cu(I)/Cu(II) redox potential is typically higher for azurin than most other copper complexes, structural studies in which Met121 (one of azurin's equatorial copper-coordinating ligands) is replaced have demonstrated that the absence of a thiolate copper ligand does not preclude high reduction potentials, as large hydrophobic residues in position 121 also raise the redox potential of the copper atom. Thus, the higher redox potentials have been attributed to the exclusion of water from the metal-binding site, a condition augmented by the presence of bulky hydrophobic residues.

Conversely, negatively charged residues lower the redox potential, since they stabilize the more positively charged cupric form of the copper ion.

== Biological function ==
When expressed in nitrogen-fixing organisms, azurin serves as the electron donor to nitrite reductase, an enzyme in the denitrification pathway of the nitrogen cycle.

Azurins support oxidative deamination of primary amines by passing electrons from aromatic amine dehydrogenase to cytochrome oxidase, as well as from some c-type cytochromes to nitrite reductases.

== Disease relevance ==
Azurin has garnered significant attention as a potential therapeutic for various diseases, including cancer. In vivo, it has been demonstrated to induce regression of human melanoma and breast cancer tissue with minimal toxic effects to the organism.

Azurin enters preferentially into cancer cells via the p28 domain of the enzyme, which roughly corresponds to the extended alpha-helical region of the enzyme. In cancer cells, azurin complexes with p53, stabilizing it and preventing association with E3 ubiquitin ligases, which would otherwise bind and mark the protein for destruction. Four azurin molecules bind each p53 monomer with high affinity. The p53/azurin complex travels to the nucleus, where p53 upregulates the transcription of proapoptotic genes Bax and Noxa. P53 also activates the expression of cell-cycle inhibitors, preventing tumor cells from progressing beyond the G1 or S phase. Although this pathway plays a significant role in azurin's anticancer activity, the details of the interaction between azurin and p53 are not well understood.

A phase I clinical trial in the United States demonstrated both partial and complete tumor regression effects in fifteen stage IV cancer patients treated with the p28 amino-acid fragment of azurin. Another phase I trial with the p28 fragment demonstrated azurin's therapeutic effects against pediatric patients with brain tumors; subsequently, the USFDA approved the designation of p28 as an orphan drug for glioma.

Azurin's other domains may also exhibit strong anticancer activity by binding to cell surface receptor tyrosine kinases such as EphB2 receptors, which induce angiogenesis in cancer cells. This is another mechanism by which azurin has been proposed to exhibit its therapeutic effects.

== See also ==
- Plastocyanin family of copper-binding proteins
