= TTQ =

TTQ or ttq may refer to:

- Tryptophan tryptophylquinone, an enzyme cofactor generated by posttranslational modification of amino acids
- TTQ, the IATA code for Tortuguero Airport
- ttq, the ISO 639-3 code for Tawellemmet language
