= Tryptophan tryptophylquinone =

Names
- IUPAC name 2-Amino-3-[2-[2-amino-3-(2-carboxyethyl)-6,7-dioxo-1H-indol-4-yl]-1H-indol-3-yl]propanoic acid

Identifiers
CAS Number	134645-25-3
3D model (JSmol)	Interactive image
ChemSpider	120330049
MeSH	Tryptophan+tryptophylquinone
PubChem CID	3035424
- InChI: InChI=1S/C22H20N4O6/c23-13(22(31)32)7-11-9-3-1-2-4-14(9)25-18(11)12-8-15(27)20(30)19-17(12)10(21(24)26-19)5-6-16(28)29/h1-4,8,13,24-25,27,30H,5-7,23H2,(H,28,29)(H,31,32) Key: FBZAAMONQBDWHA-UHFFFAOYSA-N
- SMILES: C1=CC=C2C(=C1)C(=C(N2)C3=CC(=O)C(=O)C4=C3C(=C(N4)N)CCC(=O)O)CC(C(=O)O)N

Properties
Chemical formula	C_{22}H_{20}N_{4}O_{6}
Molar mass	436.424 g·mol^{−1}
- Except where otherwise noted, data are given for materials in their standard state (at 25 °C [77 °F], 100 kPa). verify (what is ?) Infobox references

Tryptophan tryptophylquinone (TTQ) is an enzyme cofactor, generated by posttranslational modification of amino acids within the protein. Methylamine dehydrogenase (MADH), an amine dehydrogenase, that requires TTQ for its catalytic function. It is found in the bacteria Paracoccus denitrificans.

== See also ==
- Amicyanin
