= Paracoccus thiocyanatus =

Scientific classification
- Domain: Bacteria
- Kingdom: Pseudomonadati
- Phylum: Pseudomonadota
- Class: Alphaproteobacteria
- Order: Rhodobacterales
- Family: Paracoccaceae
- Genus: Paracoccus
- Species: P. thiocyanatus

Binomial name
- Paracoccus thiocyanatus Katayama et al., 1995

Species of bacterium

Paracoccus thiocyanatus is a coccoid bacterium. It utilises thiocyanate and is a facultative chemolithotroph. Its type strain is THI 011^{T}, and it is most related to Paracoccus aminophilus.
