= Paracoccus pantotrophus =

Scientific classification
- Domain: Bacteria
- Kingdom: Pseudomonadati
- Phylum: Pseudomonadota
- Class: Alphaproteobacteria
- Order: Rhodobacterales
- Family: Paracoccaceae
- Genus: Paracoccus
- Species: P. pantotrophus

Binomial name
- Paracoccus pantotrophus (Robertson and Kuenen 1984) Rainey et al. 1999

Species of bacteria

Paracoccus pantotrophus, is a gram-negative, metabolically versatile bacterium belonging to the Alphaproteobacteria class. Cells are typically ovoid (coccus-shaped), and this species is known for its ability to grow under a wide range of environmental conditions.

P. pantotrophus was first isolated in 1983 in Delft, Netherlands, from sewage treatment systems where it was associated with sulfur and nitrogen removal processes.

== Description ==
P. pantotrophus was originally classified as Thiosphaera pantotropha, but was later reassigned to the genus Paracoccus based on phylogenetic and genetic analysis of 16S rRNA sequences.

P. pantotrophus is both facultatively autotrophic and facultatively anaerobic, capable of simultaneous aerobic and anaerobic processes, a metabolic flexibility that allows it to survive and grow under both oxic and anoxic conditions and gives it unique applications in wastewater treatment.

== Morphology ==
P. pantotrophus is a non-motile bacterium known for its simple cellular structure. It is within 0.5-1.3 um in diameter and has a short coccus-shaped morphology. Cells are known to occur in singles, pairs, and clusters based on growth and presence of environmental debris. P. pantotrophus has a gram-negative cellular envelope that consists of an inner cytoplasmic membrane associated with a thin peptidoglycan layer, and an outer cell membrane containing lipopolysaccharide groups that contribute to cell signalling and adaptive stress response. Colonies cultured in solid agar in-vitro appear smooth, circular, and beige-coloured when in isolated colonies.

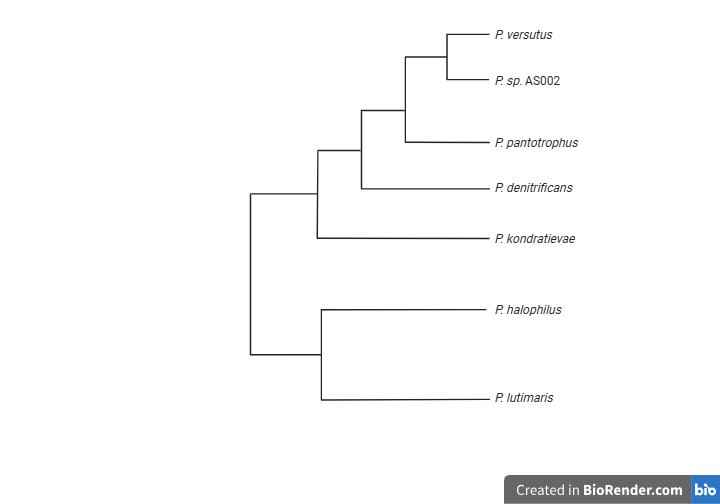
Phylogenetic grouping of species under the Paracoccus genus and closely associated phylogeny by Illumina sequencing. Reproduced from Pal et al. (2025) under the Creative Commons Attribution (CC BY) license.

High-resolution imaging shows the intracellular production and accumulation of polyhydroxyalkanoates and polyphosphate granules within specific storage regions during simultaneous aerobic and anaerobic metabolism. As well, P. pantotrophus is shown to lack flagellum appendages, and therefore has no motility. It also does not have sporulation mechanisms and consequently does not produce endospores for survival. Similar to other bacterial species within the Paracoccus genus, they are known to form biofilms that may alter their morphology in response to changes in nutrient bioavailability in situ. Another key mechanism that accounts for its diverse function is the ability to perform simultaneous aerobic and anaerobic respiration, regulating each pathway depending on environmental conditions and nutrient limitations. Its simple and small morphology, as well as metabolic diversity, result in its ecological role and survival in a diverse range of environments such as soil, brackish waters, and marine systems.

== Metabolic Versatility ==
=== Facultative aerobe and anaerobe ===
P. pantotrophus has been widely used in microbial ecophysiology research investigating how its metabolism influences marine sediment microenvironments. This bacterium is often selected due to its robust cell growth and exceptional metabolic diversity, which enables it to survive and thrive under a wide range of environmental conditions. Specifically, it is capable of both facultative aerobic and anaerobic respiration, allowing it to simultaneously reduce oxygen and other electron acceptors such as, nitrate, nitrite, nitric oxide, and nitrous oxide via its complete denitrification pathway. Unlike many other microbial denitrifiers, which require completely anaerobic conditions for denitrification to occur, P. pantotrophus can carry out denitrification even in the presence of oxygen. In most microbial systems, nitrification and denitrification are spatially or temporally separated processes that depend strongly on dissolved oxygen gradients. However, the metabolic flexibility of P. pantotrophus enables these redox transformations to occur concurrently within the same microenvironment, significantly influencing nitrogen cycling in marine sediments. This also enables highly efficient energy generation in high fluctuating redox environments.

=== Organic and inorganic carbon energy sources ===
Conversely, P. pantotrophus are also heterotrophs capable of utilizing a diverse range of carbon and energy sources such as organic acids, alcohols, sugars, and some aromatic compounds. At the same time they are chemolithotrophs that thrive on inorganic elements such as hydrogen, sulfide, elemental sulfur, and thiosulfate. This is carried out through its sulfur-oxidizing pathway. This capacity allows survival in marine oceans and sediments where organic carbon is limited, but inorganic electron donors are readily bioavailable and vice versa. P. pantotrophus is an incredibly versatile and flexible bacterial species capable of surviving and propagating in high fluctuating marine open ocean and sediments, and has been closely studied for its effect on these marine environments.

== Model Organism Applications ==
=== High adaptability and survivability ===
P. pantotrophus presents the ideal model organism in microbial ecophysiology as well as for genomic engineering research. This is because of its extraordinary metabolic diversity that makes it highly adaptable. This is important because research often requires perturbing the natural state of an organism such as by altering its environmental condition, changing the composition of the microbial population, or genetically engineering it to produce a desired phenotype. These acts often place stress on the organism, reducing its growth and viability, and negatively affecting its applications as a model organism.

=== Microbial engineering for research ===
Researchers have isolated and engineered the P. pantotrophus DSM 2944 bacterial strain which meets all of these requirements. As previously stated, P. pantotrophus is capable of utilizing a broad range of substrates as carbon and energy sources, as well as electron acceptors, allowing them to grow in different substrate media compositions in vitro. They also occupy dynamic ecological niches, particularly in alternating oxic–anoxic conditions. Its ability to simultaneously utilize the different respiratory pathways contributes to robust physiological resilience and may reduce susceptibility to competitive inhibition in the microbiota.

These nitrification, denitrification and various other metabolic pathways also allow for a high tolerance to salinity shifts, pH variation, oxidative stress, and nutrient limitations. This makes the P. pantotrophus DSM 2944 bacterial strain an ideal organism for research and microbial engineering.

=== Bioremediation in Wastewater ===
As described above, P. pantotrophus is studied due to its relatively unique metabolic diversity, and this species has been recently found to assist biodegradation under anoxic conditions. N-Methyl-2-pyrrolidone, or NWP, found in high concentrations in wastewater is a toxic industrial solvent that is highly soluble in water, making it difficult to remove, and has been determined as a health risk. P. pantotrophus, with its ability to use a wide range of carbon, nitrogen, and electron donor sources, uses NWP for its components to drive nitrate reduction, both effectively removing the organic pollutant NWP and reducing nitrate contamination. Denitrification as a dual action with NWP removal contributes to the possible benefits of using P. pantotrophus. This is due to nitrate accumulation, also called nutrient pollution, can lead to eutrophication and harm the water's natural ecosystem further.

NWP's use as a solvent in a variety of consumer and industrial products has increased its levels, and subsequently raised it to an environmental concern, driving scientific research into various possible removal methods. Previous methods, such as physio-chemical or conventional processes are limited by cost, energy consumption, consequential pollution, and available biological ability. P. pantotrophus has stirred interest because it provides a biological solution from its natural metabolism, negating the issues of using other solutions, providing a potentially scalable, low-impact method for treatment without relying on chemicals or energy-intensive pathways.

Paracoccus pantotrophus and its applications to wastewater bioremediation offers an avenue for development of more sustainable and less costly methods for removing certain types of pollution.

== Ecology and Environmental Role ==
A number of Paracoccus species including P. pantotrophus are found in wastewater systems, as reflected in its first recorded isolation from a treatment plant in Delft. The conditions that this genus grows optimally in include environments that are nitrogen-rich and have oxygen gradients, including in biofilm communities, where oxygen levels at the surface decrease in concentrations when moving further away from the surface, along with aquatic environments and deep-sea marine sediments.

When interacting with its surroundings, P. pantotrophus are able to help regulate nutrient levels in the environment, given their abilities to simultaneously perform complete denitrification, which involves the full conversion of nitrate to nitrogen gas, and nitrification, involving conversion of ammonia to nitrate. By helping to prevent the excess accumulation of nitrogen nutrients, research has suggested that P. pantotrophus may consequently help reduce the occurrence of water eutrophication from the effluent that discharges from wastewater systems. Eutrophication poses a cause for concern due to the degradation in water quality for both aquatic and terrestrial ecosystems, as resulting algal blooms lead to depletion of oxygen, preceding a decrease in marine biodiversity, as well as rises in levels of waterborne diseases. Hence, as mentioned in the prior section, P. pantotrophus have been considered a biological avenue for preventing and treating nitrogenous wastewater before it flows into the environment, as emphasized by the cost-effective quality that comes with biological treatment techniques.

In addition to these properties, P. pantotrophus exhibit abilities to use nitrate and nitrous oxide sources concurrently, allowing for consideration of their nitrous oxide reduction capability to function as a greenhouse gas sink. Although denitrifying bacteria may be sources and sinks of nitrous oxide, which acts as an intermediate, its release as a byproduct during denitrification may be minimized with the presence of the fully functioning nosZ gene, which encodes the nitrous oxide reductase enzyme responsible for converting nitrous oxide to nitrogen gas.

== Genomic Sequence ==
The genome of P. pantotrophus is approximately 4 Mbp in size, with slight variation between strains. Genome sequencing for the type strain DSM 2944 shows its DNA is organised into four circular replicons, made up of two chromosomes and two megaplasmids.

It has a relatively high proportion of guanine and cytosine bases (approximately 64-68 mol%), which is a common feature of the Paracoccus species. Phylogenetic analysis based on 16S rRNA gene sequences places the species closer to other members of the Paracoccus bacteria, particularly Paracoccus denitrificans.

The genome encodes genes involved in several key metabolic processes. These include the genes required for denitrification encoding enzymes such as nitrate reductase, nitrite reductase, nitric oxide reductase, and nitrous oxide reductase enabling the stepwise reduction of nitrate (NO₃⁻) to nitrogen gas (N₂). This process is important for nitrogen cycling and contributes to the organism's ability to reduce nitrous oxide emissions. The genome also includes genes associated with sulfur oxidation, including components of the Sox system, which allow the bacterium to use reduced sulfur compounds as an energy source. It also contains genes related to polyhydroxyalkanoate (PHA) metabolism, which are involved in carbon storage and may have applications in biodegradable plastic production.

The genome of P. pantotrophus species enables its metabolic flexibility and its ability to adapt to changing environmental conditions, and growing relevance in biotechnology and synthetic biology.
