= Rusticyanin =

Copper protein

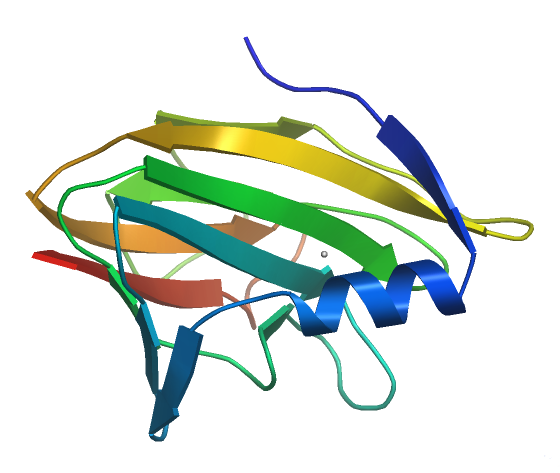
Structure of Rusticyanin (RCN) via PDB 2cak

Rusticyanin (RCN) is a copper protein with a type I copper center that plays an integral role in electron transfer. It can be extracted from the periplasm of the gram-negative bacterium Thiobacillus ferrooxidans (T. ferrooxidans), also known as Acidithiobacillus ferrooxidans (At. ferrooxidans). Rusticyanin is also found in the membrane-bound form in the surface of T. ferrooxidans. It is a part of an electron transfer chain for the oxidation of ferrous iron (Fe^{3+}).

== Function ==
As Acidithiobacillus ferrooxidans can grow aerobically at pH values of 1.6 to 3.5, it obtains its energy for chemolithotrophic growth on soluble ferrous ions. Rusticyanin is involved in the respiratory oxidation of ferrous ions to ferric ions, producing three protons for every ferrous ion oxidized. The mechanism of electron transfer in the respiratory oxidation pathway of Fe^{2+} in A. ferrooxidans is still unclear despite decades of research in this area. However, the involvement of rusticyanin in shuttling electrons from a cytochrome c2 to another cytochrome c4 during the oxidation of ferrous to ferric ions is experimentally shown. Rusticyanin is thought to shuttle electrons from high molecular weight cytochrome via cytochrome c552 to cytochrome oxidase. Predicted functional partners include coxD (cytochrome c oxidase, aa3-type, subunit IV, 64 amino acids), coxC (cytochrome c oxidase, aa3-type, subunit III, 184 amino acids), ctaB (protoheme IX farnesyltransferase), Cyc2 (cytochrome c, 485 amino acids), AFE_3142 (major facilitator family transporter, 397 amino acids), coxA (cytochrome c oxidase, aa3-type, subunit I, 627 amino acids), Cyc1 (cytochrome c552, 230 amino acids), and AFE_3141 (rrf2 family protein, 146 amino acids).

== Reactions ==
Fe(II) redox of cytochrome c552 and rusticyanin occurs with the following:

Fe^{2+}_{[membrane]} + an oxidized rusticyanin_{[membrane]} → Fe^{3+}_{[membrane]} + a reduced rusticyanin_{[membrane]};

a reduced rusticyanin_{[membrane]} + an oxidized cytochrome c552_{[membrane]} → an oxidized rusticyanin_{[membrane]} + a reduced cytochrome c552_{[membrane]};

a reduced rusticyanin_{[outside cell]} + an oxidized CycA1 cytochrome_{[outside cell]} → a reduced CycA1 cytochrome_{[outside cell]} + an oxidized rusticyanin_{[outside cell]}
