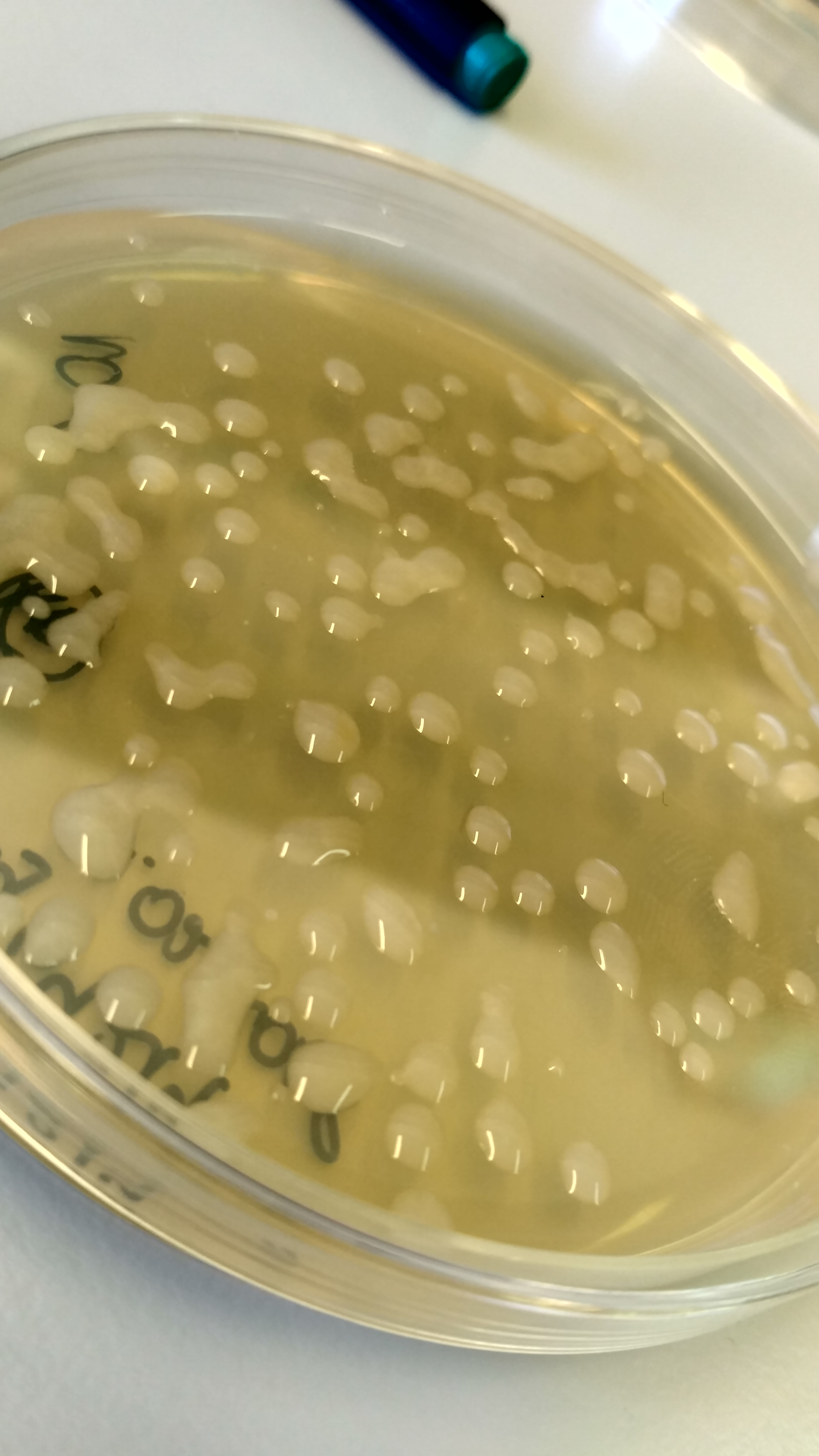
- P. yeei

Scientific classification
- Domain: Bacteria
- Kingdom: Pseudomonadati
- Phylum: Pseudomonadota
- Class: Alphaproteobacteria
- Order: Rhodobacterales
- Family: Paracoccaceae
- Genus: Paracoccus; Davis 1969 (Approved Lists 1980)

Species
- See text

Synonyms
- Thiosphaera Robertson and Kuenen 1984

= Paracoccus (bacterium) =

Genus of bacteria

Paracoccus is a genus of bacteria in the family Paracoccaceae (previously in the family Rhodobacteraceae).

== Species ==
=== Accepted species ===
The following species have been effectively and validly published:

- Paracoccus acridae Zhang et al. 2016
- Paracoccus aeridis Rai et al. 2020
- Paracoccus aerius Xue et al. 2017
- Paracoccus aerodenitrificans Zhang et al. 2023
- Paracoccus aestuarii Roh et al. 2009
- Paracoccus aestuariivivens Park et al. 2016
- Paracoccus albicereus He et al. 2023
- Paracoccus albus Zhang et al. 2023
- Paracoccus alcaliphilus Urakami et al. 1989
- Paracoccus alimentarius Kim et al. 2018
- Paracoccus alkanivorans Zhang et al. 2020
- Paracoccus alkenifer Lipski et al. 1998
- Paracoccus aminophilus Urakami et al. 1990
- Paracoccus aminovorans Urakami et al. 1990
- Paracoccus amoyensis Lyu et al. 2021
- Paracoccus angustae Sun et al. 2015
- Paracoccus aurantiacus Ye et al. 2020
- Paracoccus bengalensis Ghosh et al. 2006
- Paracoccus caeni Lee et al. 2011
- Paracoccus carotinifaciens Tsubokura et al. 1999
- Paracoccus cavernae Dominguez-Moñino et al. 2016
- Paracoccus chinensis Li et al. 2009
- Paracoccus communis Poroshina et al. 2014
- Paracoccus contaminans Kämpfer et al. 2016
- Paracoccus denitrificans (Beijerinck and Minkman 1910) Davis 1969 (Approved Lists 1980)
- Paracoccus endophyticus Zhang et al. 2019
- Paracoccus everestensis Cui et al. 2022
- Paracoccus fistulariae Kim et al. 2010
- Paracoccus fontiphilus Sheu et al. 2018
- Paracoccus haematequi Kämpfer et al. 2019
- Paracoccus haeundaensis Lee et al. 2004
- Paracoccus halophilus Liu et al. 2008
- Paracoccus halotolerans Meng et al. 2019
- Paracoccus hibisci Yan et al. 2017
- Paracoccus hibiscisoli Lin et al. 2017
- Paracoccus homiensis Kim et al. 2006
- Paracoccus huijuniae Sun et al. 2013
- Paracoccus isoporae Chen et al. 2011
- Paracoccus kocurii Ohara et al. 1990
- Paracoccus kondratievae Doronina and Trotsenko 2001
- Paracoccus koreensis La et al. 2005
- Paracoccus laeviglucosivorans Nakamura 2015
- Paracoccus liaowanqingii Li et al. 2020
- Paracoccus lichenicola Lang et al. 2023
- Paracoccus limosus Lee and Lee 2013
- Paracoccus litorisediminis Park et al. 2017
- Paracoccus luteus Ming et al. 2020
- Paracoccus lutimaris Jung et al. 2014
- Paracoccus mangrovi Chen et al. 2017
- Paracoccus marcusii Harker et al. 1998
- Paracoccus marinaquae Xue et al. 2023
- Paracoccus marinus Khan et al. 2008
- Paracoccus methylovorus Timsy et al. 2022
- Paracoccus methylutens Doronina et al. 1998
- Paracoccus niistensis Dastager et al. 2012
- Paracoccus nototheniae Kämpfer et al. 2019
- Paracoccus onchidii Xu et al. 2024
- Paracoccus onubensis Gutierrez-Patricio et al. 2021
- Paracoccus pacificus Zhang et al. 2015
- Paracoccus panacisoli Nguyen et al. 2015
- Paracoccus pantotrophus (Robertson and Kuenen 1984) Rainey et al. 1999
- Paracoccus rhizosphaerae Kämpfer et al. 2012
- Paracoccus salipaludis Dong et al. 2018
- Paracoccus saliphilus Wang et al. 2009
- Paracoccus salsus Gao et al. 2022
- Paracoccus sanguinis McGinnis et al. 2015
- Paracoccus sediminicola Zhang et al. 2023
- Paracoccus sediminilitoris Wei et al. 2019
- Paracoccus sediminis Pan et al. 2014
- Paracoccus seriniphilus Pukall et al. 2003
- Paracoccus shanxieyensis Dong et al. 2023
- Paracoccus simplex Doronina et al. 2020
- Paracoccus solventivorans Siller et al. 1996
- Paracoccus sordidisoli Singh et al. 2017
- Paracoccus sphaerophysae Deng et al. 2011
- Paracoccus stylophorae Sheu et al. 2011
- Paracoccus subflavus Zhang et al. 2019
- Paracoccus sulfuroxidans Liu et al. 2006
- Paracoccus suum Heo et al. 2019
- Paracoccus tegillarcae Lee et al. 2019
- Paracoccus thiocyanatus Katayama et al. 1996
- Paracoccus tibetensis Zhu et al. 2013
- Paracoccus versutus (Harrison 1983) Katayama et al. 1996
- Paracoccus xiamenensis Lyu et al. 2020
- Paracoccus yeei corrig. Daneshvar et al. 2003
- Paracoccus zeaxanthinifaciens Berry et al. 2003

== Provisional species ==
The following species have been published, but not validated according to the Bacteriological Code:

- "Paracoccus aquimaris" Kim and Lee 2015
- "Paracoccus beibuensis" Zheng et al. 2011
- "Paracoccus binzhouensis" Wang et al. 2021
- "Paracoccus bogoriensis" Osanjo et al. 2009
- "Paracoccus ferrooxidans" Kumaraswamy et al. 2006
- "Paracoccus gahaiensis" Zhang et al. 2016
- "Paracoccus indicus" Lin et al. 2019
- "Paracoccus jeotgali" Kim et al. 2019
- "Paracoccus maritimus" Yu et al. 2024
- "Paracoccus mutanolyticus" Buddana et al. 2016
- "Paracoccus oceanense" Fu et al. 2011
- "Paracoccus pueri" Wang et al. 2018
- "Paracoccus ravus" Yoon et al. 2019
- "Paracoccus schoinia" Takaichi et al. 2006
- "Paracoccus shandongensis" Gong et al. 2021
- "Paracoccus siganidrum" Liu et al. 2013
- "Paracoccus thiophilus" Doronina et al. 2002
- "Paracoccus zhejiangensis" Wu et al. 2013
