= Paracoccus carotinifaciens =

Scientific classification
- Domain: Bacteria
- Kingdom: Pseudomonadati
- Phylum: Pseudomonadota
- Class: Alphaproteobacteria
- Order: Rhodobacterales
- Family: Paracoccaceae
- Genus: Paracoccus
- Species: P. carotinifaciens

Binomial name
- Paracoccus carotinifaciens Tsubokura et al., 1999

Species of bacteria

Paracoccus carotinifaciens is an aerobic gram-negative bacterium which belongs to the Proteobacteria class. This micro-organism is naturally found in aquatic soils. It generates a wide sprectrum of carotenoids from the xanthophyll group.

This species was identified in 1999 in Japan and admitted as Paracoccus carotinifaciens by the International Committee on Systematics of Prokaryotes.

== Characteristics ==
Paracoccus carotinifaciens contains many carotenoids, such as astaxanthin, adonirubin, and adonixanthin. Astaxanthin in Paracoccus carotinifaciens is found in a "free" form devoid of terminal modification and features predominantly a 3S,3'S-isomeric configuration, similar to the astaxanthin found in wild salmon or trout.

== Applications ==
A selected strain of Paracoccus carotinifaciens, with higher concentration of carotenoids than the wild one, was developed through conventional selection methods without genetic engineering. The pigment derived from this strain is authorized to be used in animal feed for aquaculture (salmon, trout, red sea bream, shrimp) and for poultry (laying hen and broiler).

Under the EU regulations for organic production, Paracoccus carotinifaciens is accepted as a source of pigment for the aquaculture of salmonids (salmon and trout).
