= Nitrate reductase (quinone) =

Identifiers
- EC no.: 1.7.5.1

Databases
- IntEnz: IntEnz view
- BRENDA: BRENDA entry
- ExPASy: NiceZyme view
- KEGG: KEGG entry
- MetaCyc: metabolic pathway
- PRIAM: profile
- PDB structures: RCSB PDB PDBe PDBsum
Search
- PMC: articles
- PubMed: articles
- NCBI: proteins

Nitrate reductase (quinone) (EC 1.7.5.1, nitrate reductase A, nitrate reductase Z, quinol/nitrate oxidoreductase, quinol-nitrate oxidoreductase, quinol:nitrate oxidoreductase, NarA, NarZ, NarGHI) is an enzyme with systematic name nitrite:quinone oxidoreductase. This enzyme catalyses the following chemical reaction

nitrate + a quinol $\rightleftharpoons$ nitrite + a quinone + H_{2}O

This is a membrane-bound enzyme which supports [anaerobic respiration] on nitrate.
