= Amicyanin =

Amicyanin is a type I copper protein that plays an integral role in electron transfer. In bacteria such as Paracoccus denitrificans, amicyanin is part of a three-member redox complex, along with methylamine dehydrogenase (MADH) and cytochrome c-551i.

== Function ==
In the electron transfer mechanism from MADH to heme, amicyanin acts as an electron-accepting intermediate. In this reaction, MADH catalyzes the oxidative deamination of methylamine to formaldehyde plus ammonia. The tryptophan tryptophylquinone (TTQ) group of MADH then donates electrons to the copper centre of amicyanin, which in turn gives the electrons to the heme of the cytochrome c. In P. denitrificans, amicyanin is absolutely required for electron transfer from MADH to c-type cytochromes. It has been shown that inactivation of amicyanin by gene replacement in vivo results in complete loss of ability to grow on methylamine.

== Structure ==
As a type I copper protein, amicyanin contains one copper atom coordinated by two histidine residues and a cysteine residue in a trigonal planar structure along with an axial methionine residue ligand. Alterations from this particular coordination of the copper centre are found to negatively alter the redox potential of amicyanin. In P. denitrificans, amicyanin exists in a three-part complex along with MADH and cytochrome c-551i. This is the only redox complex composed of three weakly associated proteins naturally observed.
