= Copper protein =

Class of copper-containing proteins

Copper proteins are proteins that contain one or more copper ions as prosthetic groups. Copper proteins are found in all forms of air-breathing life. These proteins are usually associated with electron-transfer with or without the involvement of oxygen (O_{2}). Some organisms even use copper proteins to carry oxygen instead of iron proteins. A prominent copper protein in humans is cytochrome c oxidase (cco). This enzyme cco mediates the controlled combustion that produces ATP. Other copper proteins include some superoxide dismutases used in defense against free radicals, peptidyl-α-monooxygenase for the production of hormones, and tyrosinase, which affects skin pigmentation.

== Classes ==
The metal centers in the copper proteins can be classified into several types:

- Type I copper centres (T1Cu) are characterized by a single copper atom coordinated by two histidine residues and a cysteine residue in a trigonal planar structure, and a variable axial ligand. In class I T1Cu proteins (e.g. amicyanin, plastocyanin and pseudoazurin) the axial ligand is the sulfur of methionine, whereas aminoacids other than methionine (e.g. glutamine) give rise to class II T1Cu copper proteins. Azurins contain the third type of T1Cu centres: besides a methionine in one axial position, they contain a second axial ligand (a carbonyl group of a glycine residue). T1Cu-containing proteins are usually called "cupredoxins", and show similar three-dimensional structures, relatively high reduction potentials (> 250 mV), and strong absorption near 600 nm (due to S→Cu charge transfer), which usually gives rise to a blue colour. Cupredoxins are therefore often called "blue copper proteins". This may be misleading, since some T1Cu centres also absorb around 460 nm and are therefore green. When studied by EPR spectroscopy, T1Cu centres show small hyperfine splittings in the parallel region of the spectrum (compared to common copper coordination compounds).
- Type II copper centres (T2Cu) exhibit a square planar coordination by N or N/O ligands. They exhibit an axial EPR spectrum with copper hyperfine splitting in the parallel region similar to that observed in regular copper coordination compounds. Since no sulfur ligation is present, the optical spectra of these centres lack distinctive features. T2Cu centres occur in enzymes, where they assist in oxidations or oxygenations.
- Type III copper centres (T3Cu) consist of a pair of copper centres, each coordinated by three histidine residues. These proteins exhibit no EPR signal due to strong antiferromagnetic coupling (i.e. spin pairing) between the two S = 1/2 metal ions due to their covalent overlap with a bridging ligand. These centres are present in some oxidases and oxygen-transporting proteins (e.g. hemocyanin and tyrosinase).
- Binuclear Copper A centres (Cu_{A}) are found in cytochrome c oxidase and nitrous-oxide reductase (EC 1.7.99.6). The two copper atoms are coordinated by two histidines, one methionine, a protein backbone carbonyl oxygen, and two bridging cysteine residues.
- Copper B centres (Cu_{B}) are found in cytochrome c oxidase. The copper atom is coordinated by three histidines in trigonal pyramidal geometry.
- A tetranuclear Copper Z centre (Cu_{Z}) is found in nitrous-oxide reductase. The four copper atoms are coordinated by seven histidine residues and bridged by a sulfur atom.

== Blue copper proteins ==
The blue copper proteins owe their name to their intense blue coloration. Specifically, λ_{max} = 16,000 cm^{-1}, molar extinction coefficient (ε) ∼5000 M^{-1}cm^{-1}. They serve as electron transfer agents, with the active site shuttling between Cu(I) and Cu(II). The Cu^{2+} in the oxidized state can accept one electron to form Cu^{1+} in the reduced protein. The geometry of the Cu center has a major impact on its redox properties. The absence of large reorganizational changes enhances the rate of their electron transfer. The active site of a type-I blue copper protein: two 2-histidines, 1 methionine and 1 cysteine present in the coordination sphere. and a single Type I copper ion coordinated by two histidine N-donors, a cysteine thiolate S-donor and a methionine thioether S-donor. In the oxidized state, the Cu^{+2} ion will form either a trigonal bipyramidal or tetrahedral coordination. The Type 1 copper proteins are identified as blue copper proteins due to the ligand to metal charge transfer an intense band at 600 nm that gives the characteristic of a deep blue colour present in the electron absorption spectrum. Example for Type-I blue copper protein are plastocyanine, azurin, and nitrite reductase, haemocyanin and tyrosinase.

The strong bond between the copper ion and the cysteinyl thiolate.

=== Structure and bonding of the type I copper centers ===
The Blue Copper Proteins, a class of Type 1 copper proteins, are small proteins containing a cupredoxin fold.

Cu center in blue copper proteins (Cu-ligand bond distances in angstroms)

The protein structure of a Type 1 blue copper protein, amicyanin, is built from polypeptide folds that are commonly found in blue copper proteins β sandwich structure. The structure is very similar to plastocyanin and azurin as they also identify as Type 1 copper proteins.

=== Inner and outer sphere metal coordination ===
In azurin, the cysteine112 thiolate accepts the hydrogen bonds from the amide backbone of asparagine47, and phenylalanine114, and histidine46 donates a hydrogen bond to the carbonyl backbone of asparagine10. The Cysteine84 thiolate of plastocyanin accepts a hydrogen bond from a amide backbone, Asparagine38, and Histidine37 interacts strongly with the carbonyl backbone of Alanine33 and more weakly with the carbonyl backbone of Leucine5, Glycine34, and the amide backbone of Phenylalanine35.

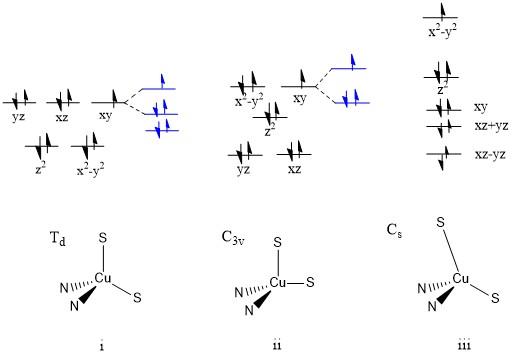
Ligand field splitting diagram for blue copper protein

=== Blue Copper Protein "Entatic State" ===
Cu^{2+} complexes often have relatively slow transfer rates. An example is the Cu^{2+/+} aquo complex, which is 5 × 10^{−7} M^{−1} s^{−1} compared to the blue copper protein which is between 1 ms and 0.1 μs. Upon electron transfer the Cu^{2+} state at the blue copper protein active site will be minimized because the Jahn-Teller effect is minimized. The distorted geometry prevents Jahn-Teller distortion. The orbital degeneracy is removed due to the asymmetric ligand field. The asymmetric ligand field is influenced by the strong equatorial cysteine ligand and the weak axial methionine ligand. In Figure 2, an energy level diagram shows three different relevant geometries and their d-orbital splitting and the Jahn-Teller effect is shown in blue. (i) shows the tetrahedral geometry energy level diagram with a that is degenerate. The tetrahedral structure can undergo Jahn-Teller distortion because of the degenerate orbitals. (ii) shows the C_{3v} symmetric geometry energy level splitting diagram with an ^{2}E ground state that is degenerate. The C_{3v} geometry was formed by the elongated methionine thioether bond at the reduced site. The unpaired electrons leads to the Jahn-Teller effect. (iii) shows the ground state energy level splitting diagram of the C_{s} geometry with a longer thioester bond and a subsequently shorter thiolate bond. This is the proper geometry of the blue copper protein. This shows that there is no presence of the Jahn-Teller effect. The energy diagram shows that the asymmetry of the short Cu-S(Cys) bond and the highly distorted Cu-L bond angles causes the degeneracy of the orbitals to be removed and thereby removing the Jahn-Teller effect, which is due to the weak donor at an Cu-S(Met) and strong donor at Cu-S(Met).

== See also ==
- Copper in health
- Stellacyanin
