= Terpentetriene synthase =

Type of enzyme

Identifiers
- EC no.: 4.2.3.36

Databases
- IntEnz: IntEnz view
- BRENDA: BRENDA entry
- ExPASy: NiceZyme view
- KEGG: KEGG entry
- MetaCyc: metabolic pathway
- PRIAM: profile
- PDB structures: RCSB PDB PDBe PDBsum
Search
- PMC: articles
- PubMed: articles
- NCBI: proteins

Terpentetriene synthase (EC 4.2.3.36, Cyc2) is an enzyme with systematic name terpentedienyl-diphosphate diphosphate-lyase (terpentetriene-forming). This enzyme catalyses the following chemical reaction

terpentedienyl diphosphate $\rightleftharpoons$ terpentetriene + diphosphate

This enzyme requires Mg^{2+} for maximal activity but can use Mn^{2+}, Fe^{2+} or Co^{2+} to a lesser extent.
