= Iron:rusticyanin reductase =

Identifiers
- EC no.: 1.16.9.1

Databases
- IntEnz: IntEnz view
- BRENDA: BRENDA entry
- ExPASy: NiceZyme view
- KEGG: KEGG entry
- MetaCyc: metabolic pathway
- PRIAM: profile
- PDB structures: RCSB PDB PDBe PDBsum
Search
- PMC: articles
- PubMed: articles
- NCBI: proteins

Iron:rusticyanin reductase (EC 1.16.9.1, Cyc2) is an enzyme with systematic name Fe(II):rusticyanin oxidoreductase. This enzyme catalyses the following chemical reaction

Fe(II) + rusticyanin $\rightleftharpoons$ Fe(III) + reduced rusticyanin

Rusticyanin reductase contains c-type heme.
