= Nitrite reductase (NO-forming) =

Class of enzymes

nitrite reductase (NO-forming)
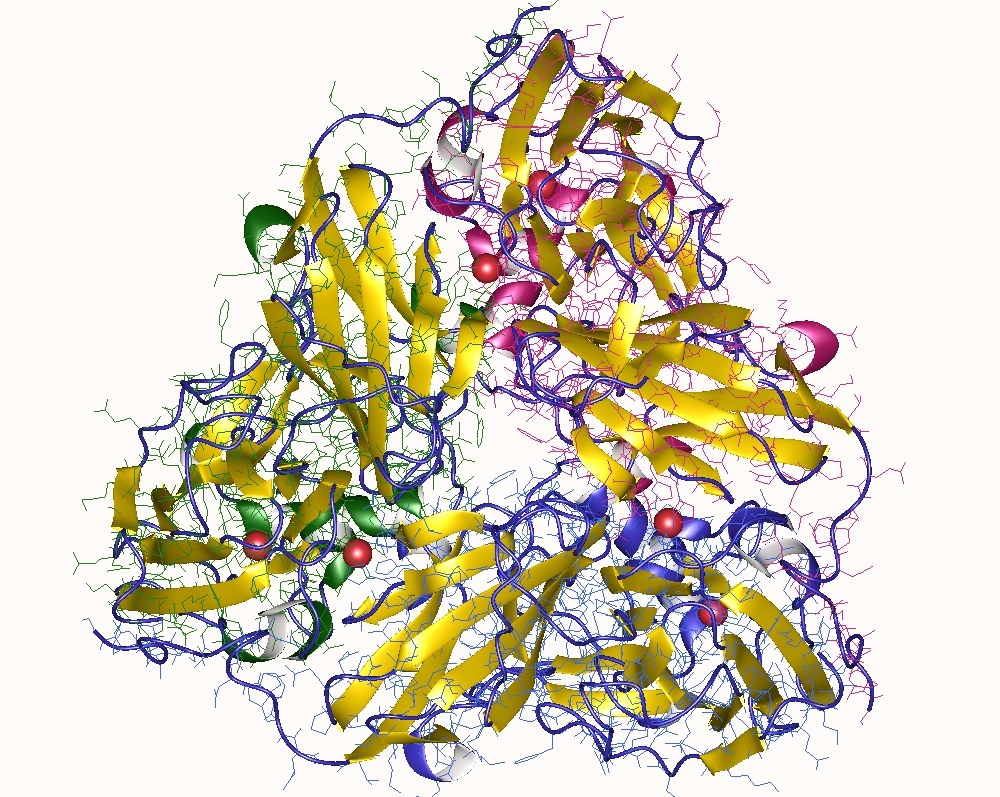
- Nitrite reductase trimer, Alcaligenes faecalis

Identifiers
- EC no.: 1.7.2.1
- CAS no.: 37256-41-0

Databases
- BRENDA: enzyme data
- ExPASy: NiceZyme view
- KEGG: enzyme entry
- MetaCyc: metabolic pathway
- Rhea: reactions
- PDB structures: RCSB PDB PDBe PDBsum
- Gene Ontology: AmiGO / QuickGO
Search
- PMC: articles
- PubMed: articles
- NCBI: proteins

In enzymology, a nitrite reductase (NO-forming) (EC 1.7.2.1) is an enzyme that catalyzes the chemical reaction

nitric oxide + H_{2}O + ferricytochrome c ⇌ nitrite + ferrocytochrome c + 2 H^{+}

The 3 substrates of this enzyme are nitric oxide, H_{2}O, and ferricytochrome c, whereas its 3 products are nitrite, ferrocytochrome c, and H^{+}.

This enzyme belongs to the family of oxidoreductases, specifically those acting on other nitrogenous compounds as donors with a cytochrome as acceptor. The systematic name of this enzyme class is nitric-oxide:ferricytochrome-c oxidoreductase. Other names in common use include cd-cytochrome nitrite reductase, [nitrite reductase (cytochrome)] [misleading, see comments.], cytochrome c-551:O2, NO_{2}^{+} oxidoreductase, cytochrome cd, cytochrome cd1, hydroxylamine (acceptor) reductase, methyl viologen-nitrite reductase, nitrite reductase (cytochrome, and NO-forming). This enzyme participates in nitrogen metabolism. It has 3 cofactors: FAD, Iron, and Copper.

== Structural studies ==
As of late 2007, 20 structures have been solved for this class of enzymes, with PDB accession codes PDB: 1RZP, PDB: 1RZQ, PDB: 1SJM, PDB: 1SNR, PDB: 1ZDQ, PDB: 1ZDS, PDB: 1ZV2, PDB: 2A3T, PDB: 2AVF, PDB: 2B08, PDB: 2BW4, PDB: 2BW5, PDB: 2BWD, PDB: 2BWI, PDB: 2DV6, PDB: 2DWS, PDB: 2DWT, PDB: 2DY2, PDB: 2FJS, and PDB: 2JFC.
