= Nitrate reductase (cytochrome) =

Class of enzymes

Identifiers
- EC no.: 1.9.6.1
- CAS no.: 9029-42-9

Databases
- IntEnz: IntEnz view
- BRENDA: BRENDA entry
- ExPASy: NiceZyme view
- KEGG: KEGG entry
- MetaCyc: metabolic pathway
- PRIAM: profile
- PDB structures: RCSB PDB PDBe PDBsum
Search
- PMC: articles
- PubMed: articles
- NCBI: proteins

Nitrate reductase (cytochrome) (EC 1.9.6.1, respiratory nitrate reductase, benzyl viologen-nitrate reductase) is an enzyme with systematic name ferrocytochrome:nitrate oxidoreductase. This enzyme catalises the following chemical reaction

2 ferrocytochrome + 2 H^{+} + nitrate $\rightleftharpoons$ 2 ferricytochrome + nitrite
