= Paracoccus denitrificans =

Scientific classification
- Domain: Bacteria
- Kingdom: Pseudomonadati
- Phylum: Pseudomonadota
- Class: Alphaproteobacteria
- Order: Rhodobacterales
- Family: Paracoccaceae
- Genus: Paracoccus
- Species: P. denitrificans

Binomial name
- Paracoccus denitrificans Davis, 1969

Species of bacterium

Paracoccus denitrificans, is a coccoid bacterium known for its nitrate reducing properties, its ability to replicate under conditions of hypergravity and for being a relative of the eukaryotic mitochondrion (endosymbiotic theory).

== Description ==
Paracoccus denitrificans, is a gram-negative, coccus, non-motile, denitrifying (nitrate-reducing) bacterium. It is typically a rod-shaped bacterium but assumes spherical shapes during the stationary phase. Like all gram-negative bacteria, it has a double membrane with a cell wall. Formerly known as Micrococcus denitrificans, it was first isolated in 1910 by Martinus Beijerinck, a Dutch microbiologist. The bacterium was reclassified in 1969 to Paracoccus denitrificans by D.H. Davis. The genome of P. denitrificans was sequenced in 2004.

== Ecology and ecological applications ==
Metabolically Paracoccus denitrificans is very flexible and has been recorded in soil in both aerobic or anaerobic environments. The microbe also has the ability to live in many different kinds of media and environments and is known to be an extremophile. The bacteria are able to obtain energy both from organic compounds, such as methanol and methylamine, and from inorganic compounds, such as hydrogen and sulfur. The ability to metabolise compounds of hydrogen and sulfur, such as thiosulfate has led to the microbe being exploited as a model organism for the study of poorly characterized sulfur compound transformations.

The denitrification properties of Paracoccus denitrificans are an important cause for the loss of nitrogen fertilisers in agricultural soil. This is possibly due to the chemical process called "denitrification" in which nitrogen is converted to dinitrogen to produce nitric oxide and nitrous oxide which cause damage to the atmosphere. Although the enzymatic mechanisms of this denitrification process are well characterised, the exact molecular controles are yet to be fully described. As such, Paracoccus denitrificans has emerged as an important model organism for the characterisation of the complete denitrification process in order to potentially reduce excessive nitrous oxide release from nitrogen fertilised soils.

Metabolically, Paracoccus denitrificans is a known chemolithoautotroph - several strains of the microbe have been isolated that grow chemolithoautotrophically using carbon disulfide or carbonyl sulfide as energy sources. It is not a known human pathogen.

Paracoccus is a biochemically versatile genus, possessing a variety of metabolisms through which a wide range of diverse compounds can be degraded. Accordingly, it has the potential for a wide variety of capabilities and applications in bioremediation.

The denitrifying property of Paracoccus denitrificans has been used in creating a bioreactor, in this case, a tubular gel containing two bacteria, for the removal of nitrogen from wastewater. Paracoccus denitrificans reduces nitrite to nitrogen gas while Nitrosomonas europaea oxidizes ammonia to nitrite, thus fueling the former metabolism. This system simplifies the process of removing nitrogen from wastewater.

Certain strains of the microbe can utilize thiocyanate as an energy source, a capability which could help clean thiocyanate-contaminated wastewater from coke-oven factories. Other strains have been discovered that can degrade halobenzoates under anaerobic denitrifying conditions, and that can degrade sulfonates under anaerobic growth conditions.

Strains of Paracoccus denitrificans have been isolated from activated sludge that degrade a variety of methylated amines under both aerobic and anaerobic conditions; another strain is chemolithoautotrophically capable of degrading quaternary carbon compounds such as dimethylmalonate under denitrifying conditions.

Some strains are capable of 'aerobic denitrification', the complete dissimilation of nitrate to dinitrogen (or nitrous oxide) under aerobic growth conditions. The microbe also can oxidize ammonia to nitrite while grown on organic energy sources, a process known as 'heterotrophic nitrification'. Coupled to denitrification, heterotrophic nitrification allows for the complete transformation of ammonia to dinitrogen by a single organism.

== Resemblance to mitochondria ==
Early research indicated that Paracoccus denitrificans especially resembled mitochondria. The bacteria encloses within itself the biochemistry of the mitochondrial respiratory chain and oxidative phosphorylation. While these features are found randomly distributed in other species of aerobic bacteria, to date all of these are only found in Paracoccus denitrificans. In addition, a feasible mechanism for the evolution of a eukaryotic mitochondrion, from the plasma membrane of an ancestral aerobic bacterium resembling P. denitrificans to the inner mitochondrial membrane, has been suggested. More recent phylogenetic analysis however puts other bacteria more closely related to mitochondria: see Proto-mitochondrion.

== Growth under hypergravity ==
Recent research carried out on extremophiles in Japan involved a variety of bacteria including Paracoccus denitrificans being subject to conditions of extreme gravity. The bacteria were cultivated while being rotated in an ultracentrifuge at high speeds corresponding to 403,627 times g (the normal acceleration resulting from gravity at the Earth's surface). Paracoccus denitrificans displayed not only survival but also robust cellular growth under these conditions of hyper-acceleration which are usually found only in cosmic environments, such as on very massive stars or in the shock waves of supernovas. Analysis showed that the small size of prokaryotic cells is essential for successful growth under hypergravity. The research has implications on the feasibility of the existence of exobacteria and panspermia.
