= Phyllonorycter trifoliella =

Scientific classification
- Domain: Eukaryota
- Kingdom: Animalia
- Phylum: Arthropoda
- Class: Insecta
- Order: Lepidoptera
- Family: Gracillariidae
- Genus: Phyllonorycter
- Species: P. trifoliella

Binomial name
- Phyllonorycter trifoliella (Gerasimov, 1933)

Synonyms
- Lithocolletis trifoliella Gerasimov, 1933

Species of moth

Phyllonorycter trifoliella is a moth of the family Gracillariidae. It is known from Estonia, Finland, Georgia, Latvia, Lithuania and the Krasnodar Region of Russia.

The larvae feed on Lathyrus roseus and Trifolium species. They mine the leaves of their host plant.
