= Lathyrus maritimus =

Lathyrus maritimus is a scientific name that has been published three times, but is considered a botanical synonym of two species of plant:

- Lathyrus japonicus, synonym published in 1840 by Jacob Bigelow
- Lathyrus japonicus, synonym published in 1845 by Elias Magnus Fries
- Lathyrus vestitus, synonym published in 1859 by John Torrey
