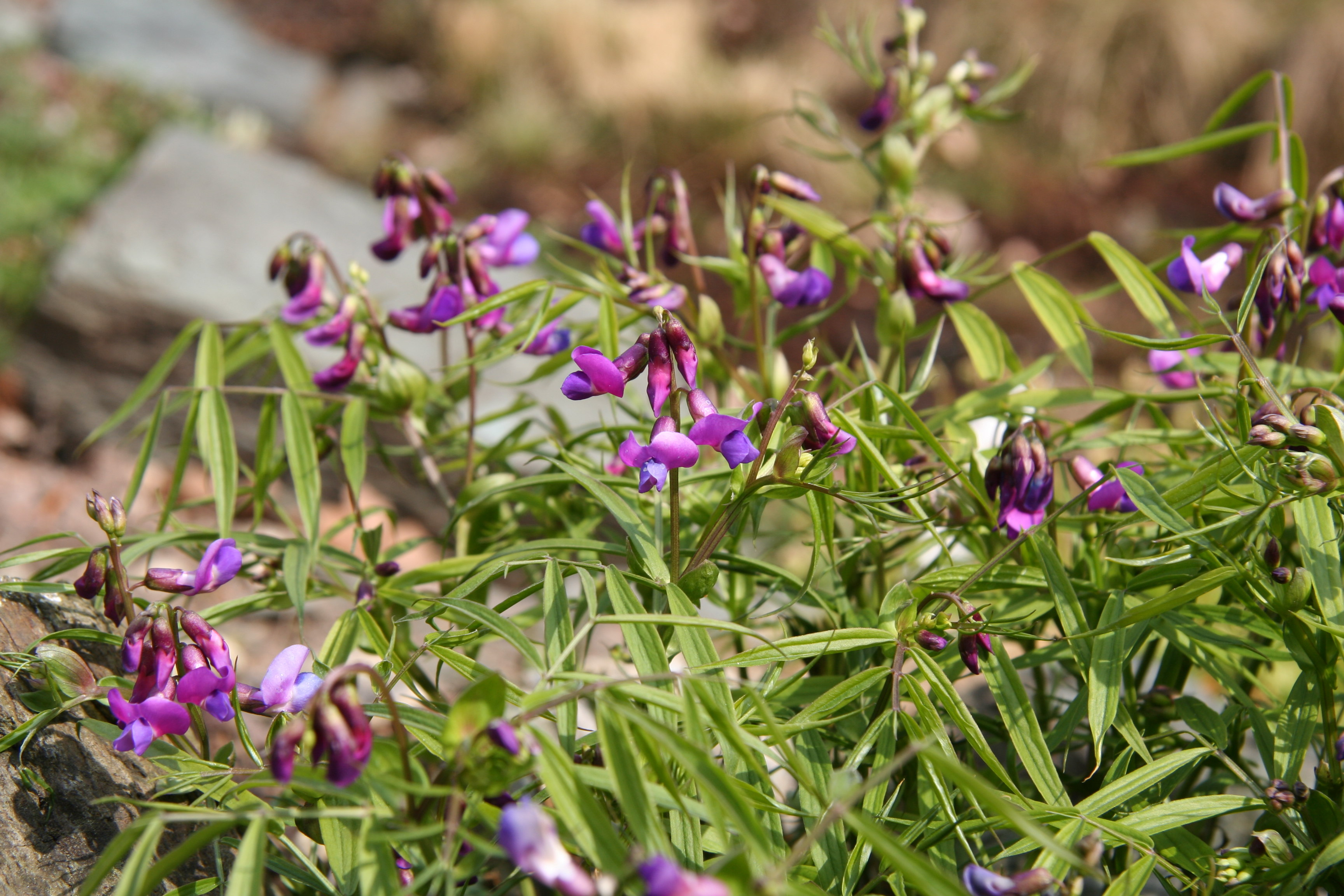

Scientific classification
- Kingdom: Plantae
- Clade: Tracheophytes
- Clade: Angiosperms
- Clade: Eudicots
- Clade: Rosids
- Order: Fabales
- Family: Fabaceae
- Subfamily: Faboideae
- Genus: Lathyrus
- Species: L. alpestris

Binomial name
- Lathyrus alpestris (Waldst. & Kit.) Kit.

Synonyms
- Orobus alpestris Waldst. & Kit. 1804; Orobus pallescens var. alpestris (Waldst. & Kit.) Rchb. 1832; Lathyrus alpestris subsp. friedrichsthalii (Griseb.) Bässler i1971; Lathyrus alpestris var. regis-alexandri (Širj.) Širj. 1937; Lathyrus alpestris var. skorpili (Velen.) Kožuharov 1976; Lathyrus friedrichsthalii (Griseb.) K.Malý 1910; Lathyrus friedrichsthalii var. skorpili (Velen.) Hayek 1926; Lathyrus vernus var. regis-alexandri Širj. 1936; Orobus friedrichsthalii Griseb. 1846; Orobus skorpili Velen. 1890

= Lathyrus alpestris =

Species of plant

Lathyrus alpestris is a species of Lathyrus found in Albania, Bulgaria, and Greece
