= Lathyrus macropus =

Scientific classification
- Kingdom: Plantae
- Clade: Tracheophytes
- Clade: Angiosperms
- Clade: Eudicots
- Clade: Rosids
- Order: Fabales
- Family: Fabaceae
- Subfamily: Faboideae
- Genus: Lathyrus
- Species: L. macropus

Binomial name
- Lathyrus macropus Gillies ex Hook. & Arn.

Species of plant

Lathyrus macropus is a species of Lathyrus found in Argentina.
