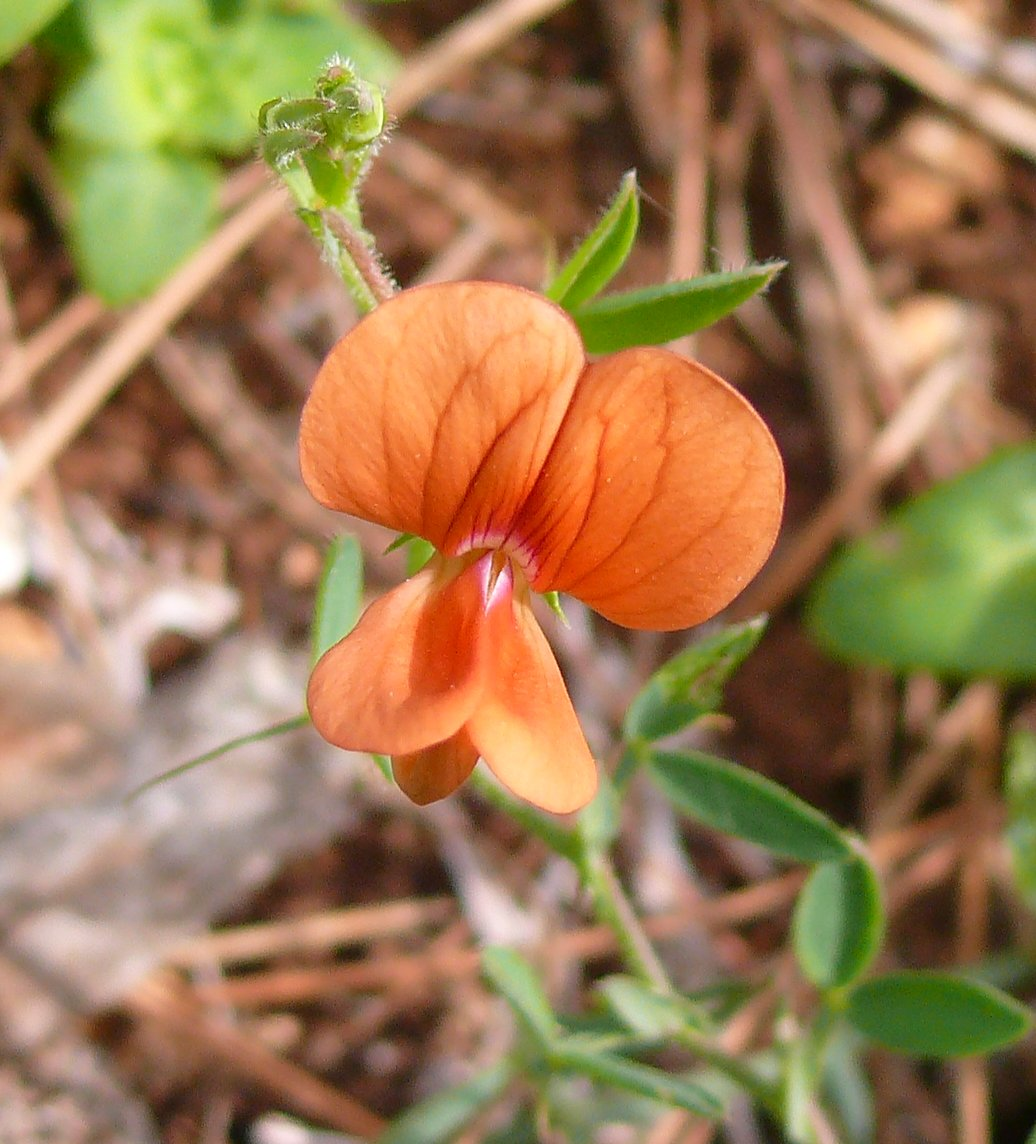

Scientific classification
- Kingdom: Plantae
- Clade: Tracheophytes
- Clade: Angiosperms
- Clade: Eudicots
- Clade: Rosids
- Order: Fabales
- Family: Fabaceae
- Subfamily: Faboideae
- Genus: Lathyrus
- Species: L. hierosolymitanus

Binomial name
- Lathyrus hierosolymitanus Boiss.

Synonyms
- Lathyrus annuus var. hierosolymitanus (Boiss.) Post 1896; Lathyrus hierosolymitanus var. amphicarpus Plitmann 1972; Lathyrus hierosolymitanus var. luteus Plitmann 1972

= Lathyrus hierosolymitanus =

Species of plant

Lathyrus hierosolymitanus is a species of peavine found in East Aegean Island, Egypt, Greece, Kriti, Lebanon, Syria, Libya, Palestine, and Turkey.
