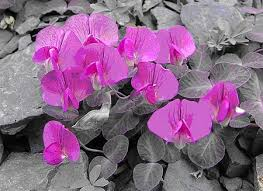

Scientific classification
- Kingdom: Plantae
- Clade: Tracheophytes
- Clade: Angiosperms
- Clade: Eudicots
- Clade: Rosids
- Order: Fabales
- Family: Fabaceae
- Subfamily: Faboideae
- Genus: Lathyrus
- Species: L. formosus

Binomial name
- Lathyrus formosus (Steven) Kenicer (2021)

Varieties
- Lathyrus formosus var. formosus (Stev.) Al. Fed.; Lathyrus formosus var. pubescens Townsend

Synonyms
- Lathyrus frigidus Schott & Kotschy (1856); Orobus formosus Steven (1813); Orobus formosus var. microphyllus Ser. (1825); Pisum aucheri Jaub. & Spach (1842); Pisum formosum (Steven) Alef. (1861); Pisum formosum var. pubescens C.C.Towns. (1967 publ. 1968); Pisum frigidum Alef. (1860); Vavilovia aucheri Fed. (1939); Vavilovia formosa (Steven) Fed. (1939)

= Lathyrus formosus =

Species of flowering plant

Lathyrus formosus is a species of flowering plant in the legume family, Fabaceae. It is an herbaceous perennial which grows primarily in high mountain areas on shale or rocky ground in Turkey, Iran, Iraq, Lebanon, and the Caucasus.

The species was described as Orobus formosus in 1812, and has been known by several other names until being reclassified as Lathyrus formosus in 2021. The synonym Vavilovia was named after the Russian geneticist, economic botanist, and plant geographer, Nikolai Ivanovich Vavilov.
