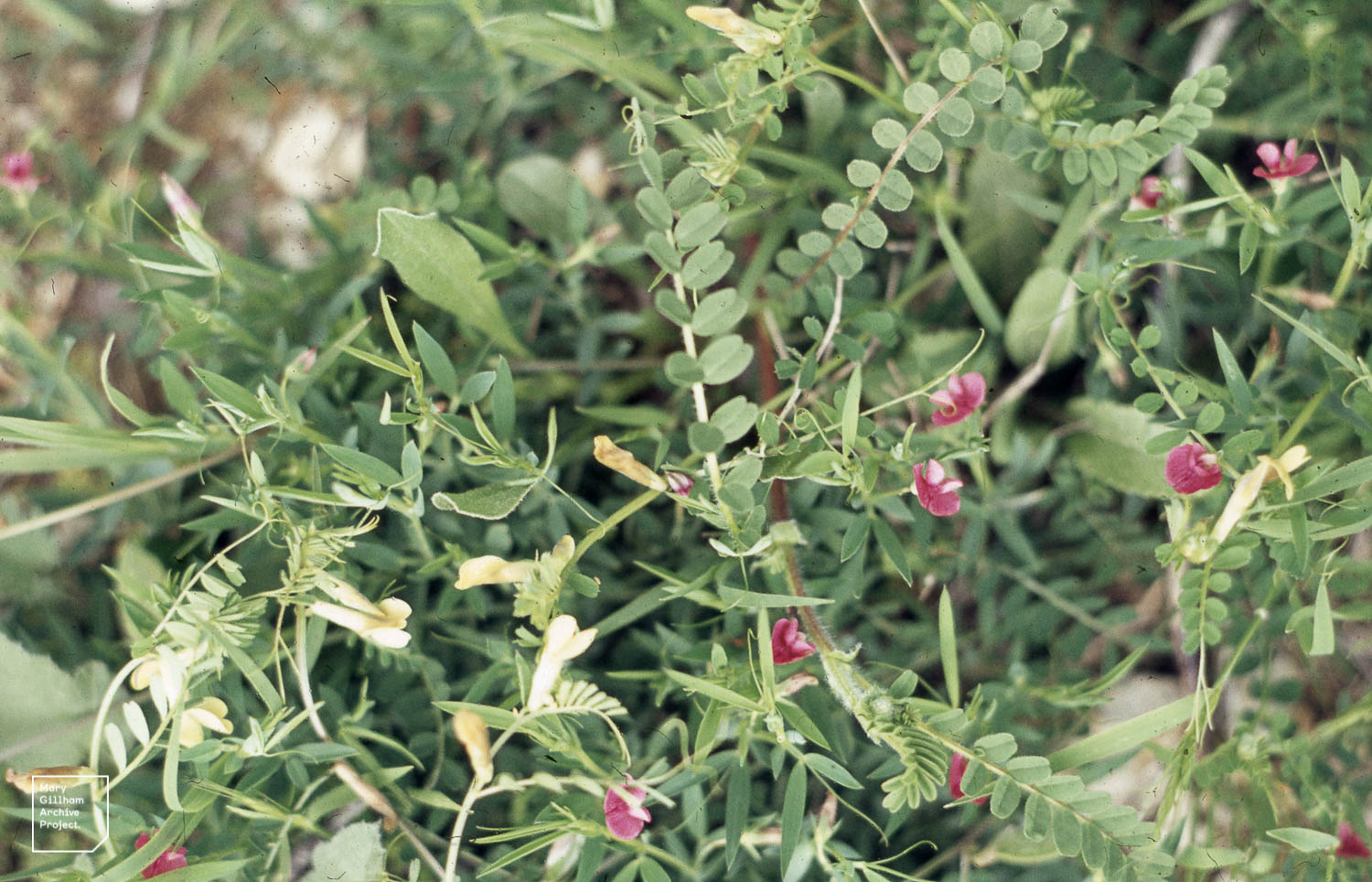

Scientific classification
- Kingdom: Plantae
- Clade: Tracheophytes
- Clade: Angiosperms
- Clade: Eudicots
- Clade: Rosids
- Order: Fabales
- Family: Fabaceae
- Subfamily: Faboideae
- Genus: Lathyrus
- Species: L. inconspicuus

Binomial name
- Lathyrus inconspicuus L.

Synonyms
- Lathyrus erectus

= Lathyrus inconspicuus =

Species of plant

Lathyrus inconspicuus, the inconspicuous pea, is a species of annual herb in the family Fabaceae.

== Sources ==
This article incorporates text from a free content work. Licensed under CC0 (license statement/permission). Text taken from Lathyrus inconspicuus. Encyclopedia of Life.
