= Lathyrus jepsonii =

- Variety californicus in Pinnacles National Park

Conservation status
- Secure (NatureServe)

Scientific classification
- Kingdom: Plantae
- Clade: Tracheophytes
- Clade: Angiosperms
- Clade: Eudicots
- Clade: Rosids
- Order: Fabales
- Family: Fabaceae
- Subfamily: Faboideae
- Genus: Lathyrus
- Species: L. jepsonii

Binomial name
- Lathyrus jepsonii Greene

Synonyms
- Lathyrus californicus; Lathyrus watsonii

Plant species in the pea family

Lathyrus jepsonii is a species of wild pea known by the common names delta tule pea and Jepson's pea. It is endemic to California, where it grows in a number of habitat types, including forest and estuary.

This is a perennial herb with a long, winged stem which climbs by means of branched, coiled tendrils. The leaves are made up of several pairs of lance-shaped leaflets. The plant bears an inflorescence of up to 15 pink or purplish flowers each up to 2 centimeters wide. The fruit is a hairless, dehiscent legume pod.

== Taxonomy ==
Lathyrus jepsonii was scientifically described by Edward Lee Greene in 1890. It is classified in the Lathyrus genus within the Fabaceae family and has two varieties.

- Lathyrus jepsonii var. californicus is a smaller plant which is sometimes hairy,
- Lathyrus jepsonii var. jepsonii this rare variety can exceed two meters in height and is hairless, a rare variety which grows in the estuary habitat of the Sacramento-San Joaquin River Delta, the origin of the common name delta tule pea.

Variety californicus has four synonyms.

Table of Synonyms
Name	Year	Rank	Notes
Lathyrus californicus (S.Watson) S.Watson	1885	species	≡ hom., nom. illeg. homonym. post.
Lathyrus jepsonii subsp. californicus (S.Watson) C.L.Hitchc.	1952	subspecies	≡ hom.
Lathyrus venosus var. californicus S.Watson	1876	variety	≡ hom.
Lathyrus watsonii T.G.White	1894	species	= het.
Notes: ≡ homotypic synonym; = heterotypic synonym
