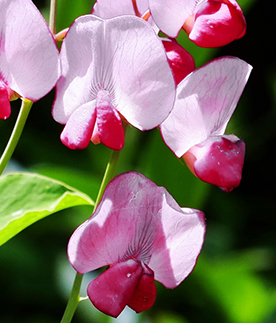

Conservation status
- Endangered (IUCN 3.1)

Scientific classification
- Kingdom: Plantae
- Clade: Tracheophytes
- Clade: Angiosperms
- Clade: Eudicots
- Clade: Rosids
- Order: Fabales
- Family: Fabaceae
- Subfamily: Faboideae
- Genus: Lathyrus
- Species: L. undulatus

Binomial name
- Lathyrus undulatus Boiss.

Synonyms
- Lathyrus rotundifolius subsp. undulatus (Boiss.) Ponert

= Lathyrus undulatus =

Species of plant in the family Fabaceae

Lathyrus undulatus, also known as wavy pea, is a flowering plant in the genus Lathyrus, which is in the family Fabaceae. It is native to Turkey, specifically the northwest slopes of Trabzon, Rize, Bolu, Bursa, Sakarya; as well as Crimea, specifically the southern slopes of Nikita Yayla. Its Turkish name is Istanbul Nazendesi.

Lathyrus undulatus is a perennial plant, growing to a height of 50–100 cm (3 ft 3 in–6 ft 7 in) under suitable living conditions. It lives in temperate climates. In the wild, the flowers are pink and around 1–2 cm long. Its seeds are dark, its flowers bloom in May, and it bears fruits from June to July.
