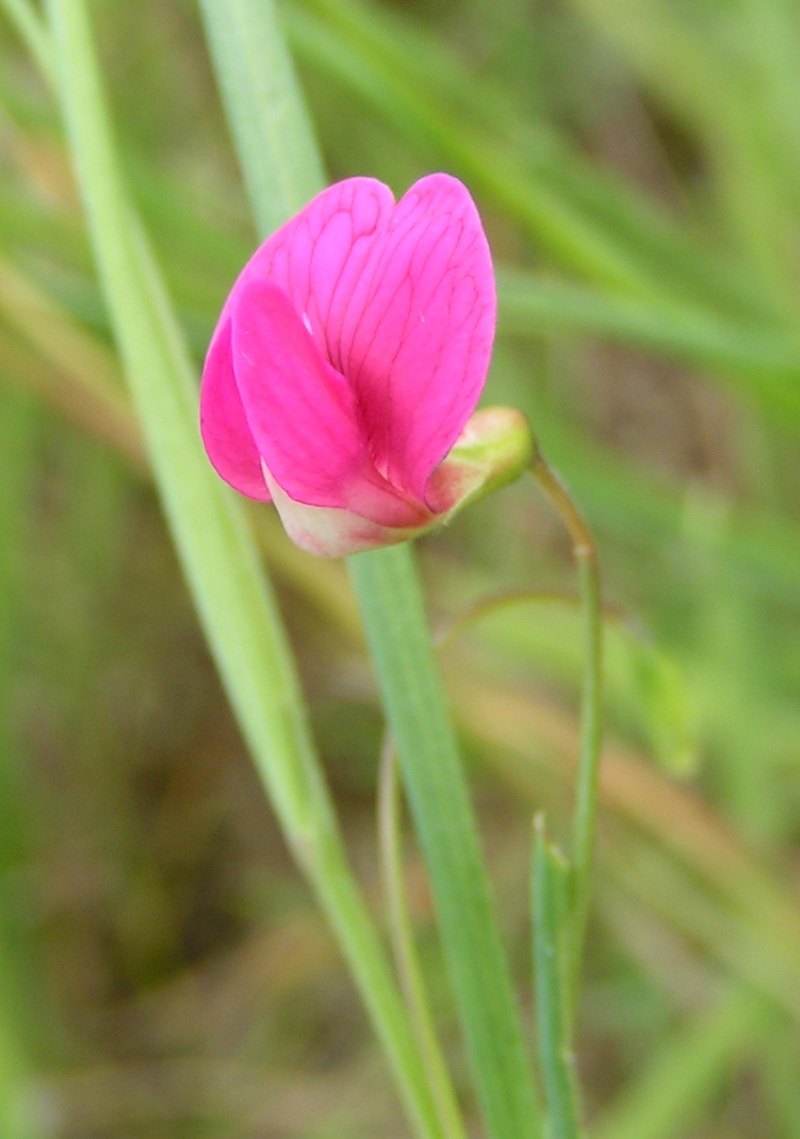
- Grass vetchling (Lathyrus nissolia)

Scientific classification
- Kingdom: Plantae
- Clade: Tracheophytes
- Clade: Angiosperms
- Clade: Eudicots
- Clade: Rosids
- Order: Fabales
- Family: Fabaceae
- Subfamily: Faboideae
- Clade: Inverted repeat-lacking clade
- Tribe: Fabeae
- Genus: Lathyrus; L. (1753), nom. cons.

Species
- 181; see text

Synonyms
- Anurus C.Presl (1837); Aphaca Mill. (1754); Astrophia Nutt. (1838); Athyrus Neck. (1790), opus utique oppr.; Cicercula Medik. (1787); Clymenum Mill. (1754); Graphiosa Alef. (1861); Konxikas Raf. (1840); Lastila Alef. (1861); Lathyroides Heist. (1759), nom. superfl.; Lathyros St.-Lag. (1880), orth. var.; Menkenia Bubani (1899); Navidura Alef. (1861); Nissolia Mill. (1754), nom. rej.; Ochrus Mill. (1754); Orobus L. (1753); Oxypogon Raf. (1819); Pisum L. (1753); Platystylis Sweet (1828); Spatulima Raf. (1837); Vavilovia Fed. (1939)

= Lathyrus =

Genus of flowering plants

Lathyrus /ˈlæθɪrəs/ is a genus of flowering plants in the legume family Fabaceae, and contains approximately 160 species. Commonly known as peavines or vetchlings, they are native to temperate areas, with a breakdown of 52 species in Europe, 30 species in North America, 78 in Asia, 24 in tropical East Africa, and 24 in temperate South America. There are annual and perennial species which may be climbing or bushy. This genus has numerous sections, including Orobus, which was once a separate genus. The genus has numerous synonyms, including Pisum, the ancient Latin name for the pea.

== Species ==
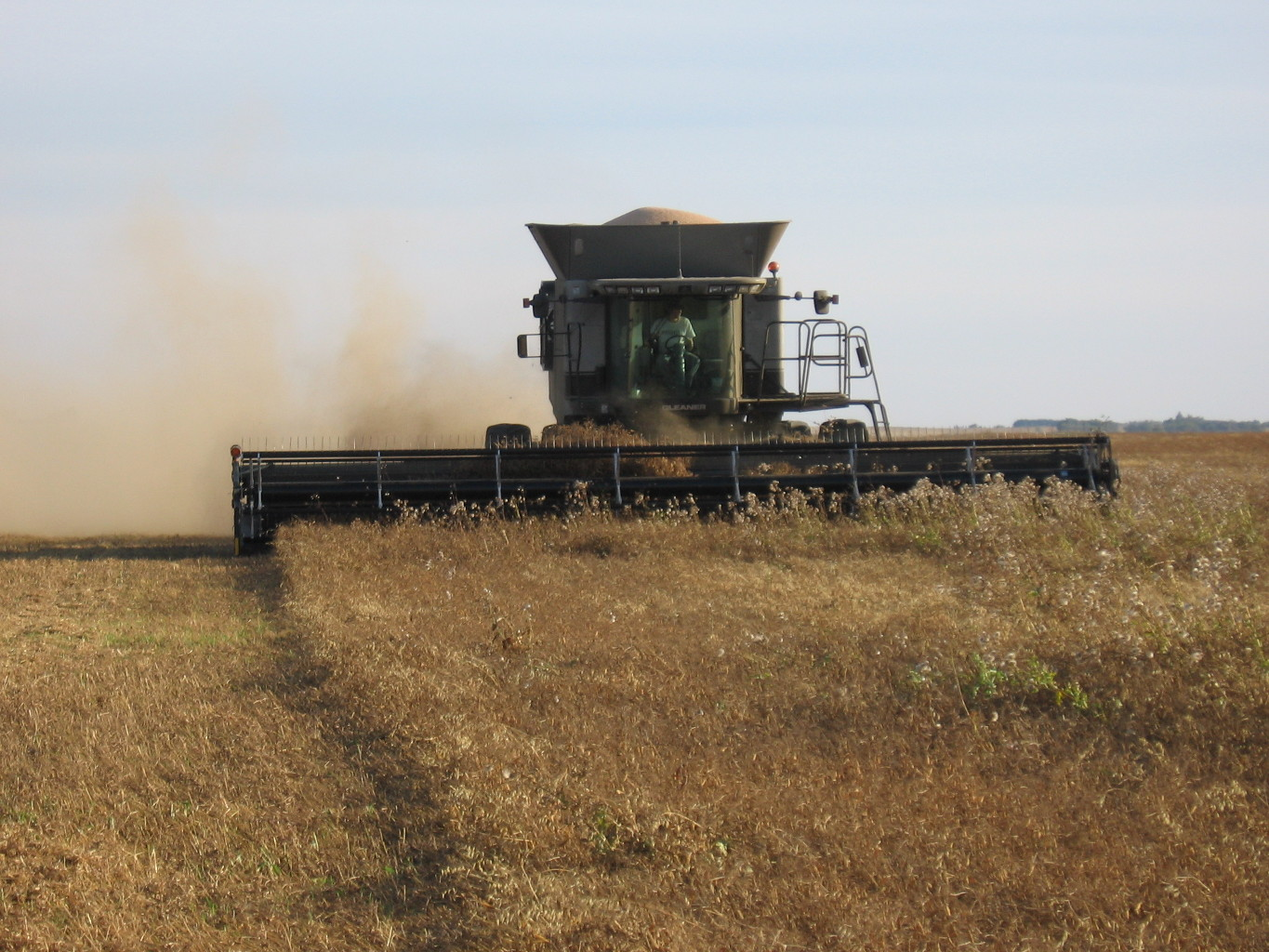
Harvest of Lathyrus aphaca crop

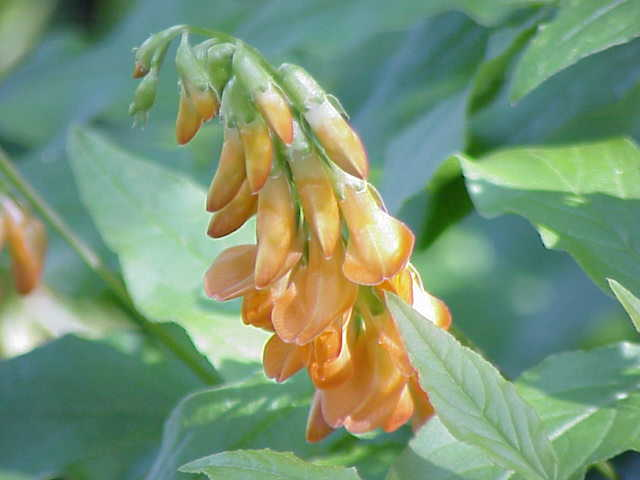
Lathyrus aureus

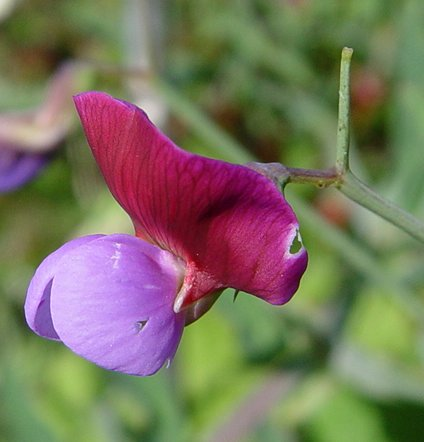
Lathyrus clymenum

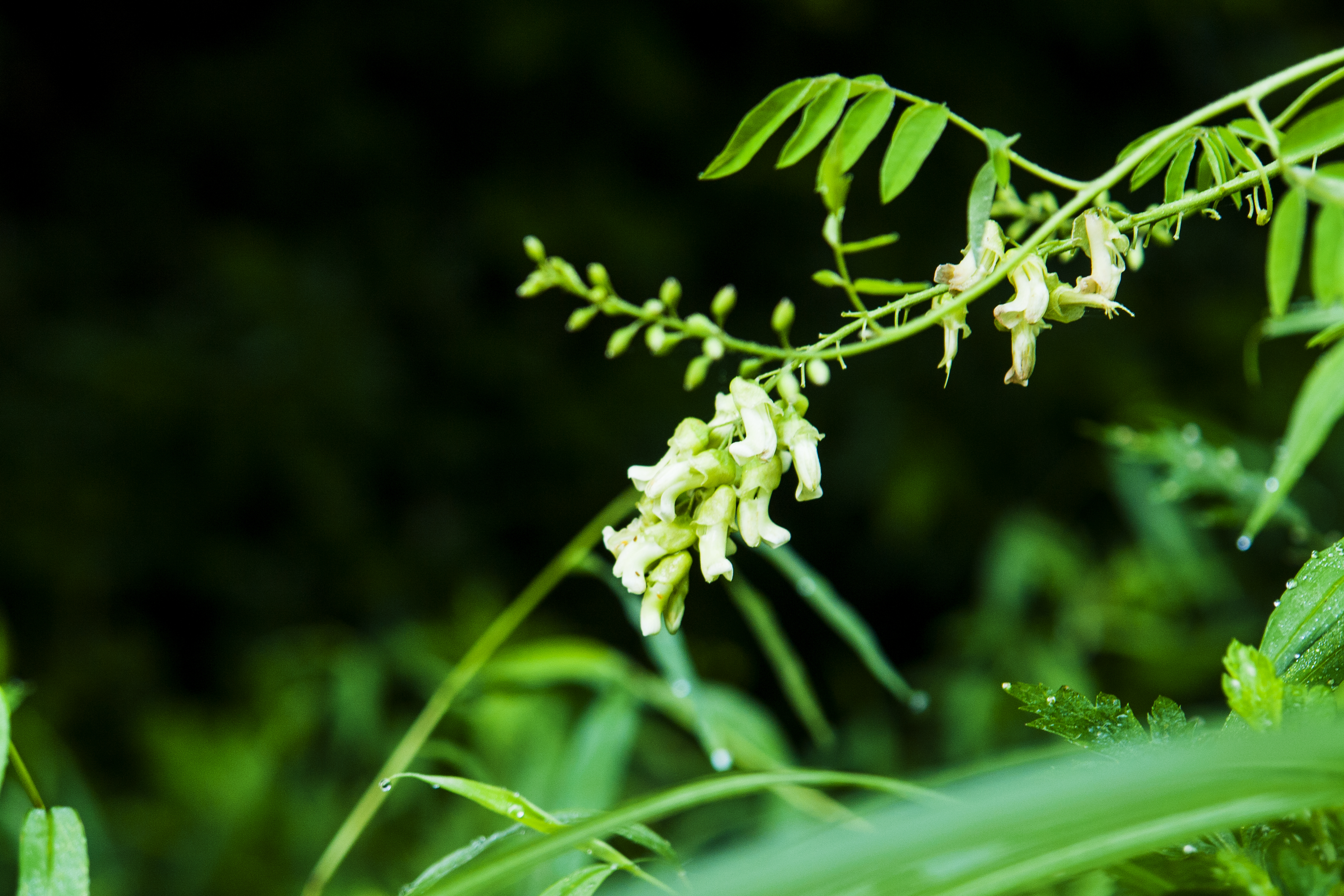
Lathyrus davidii

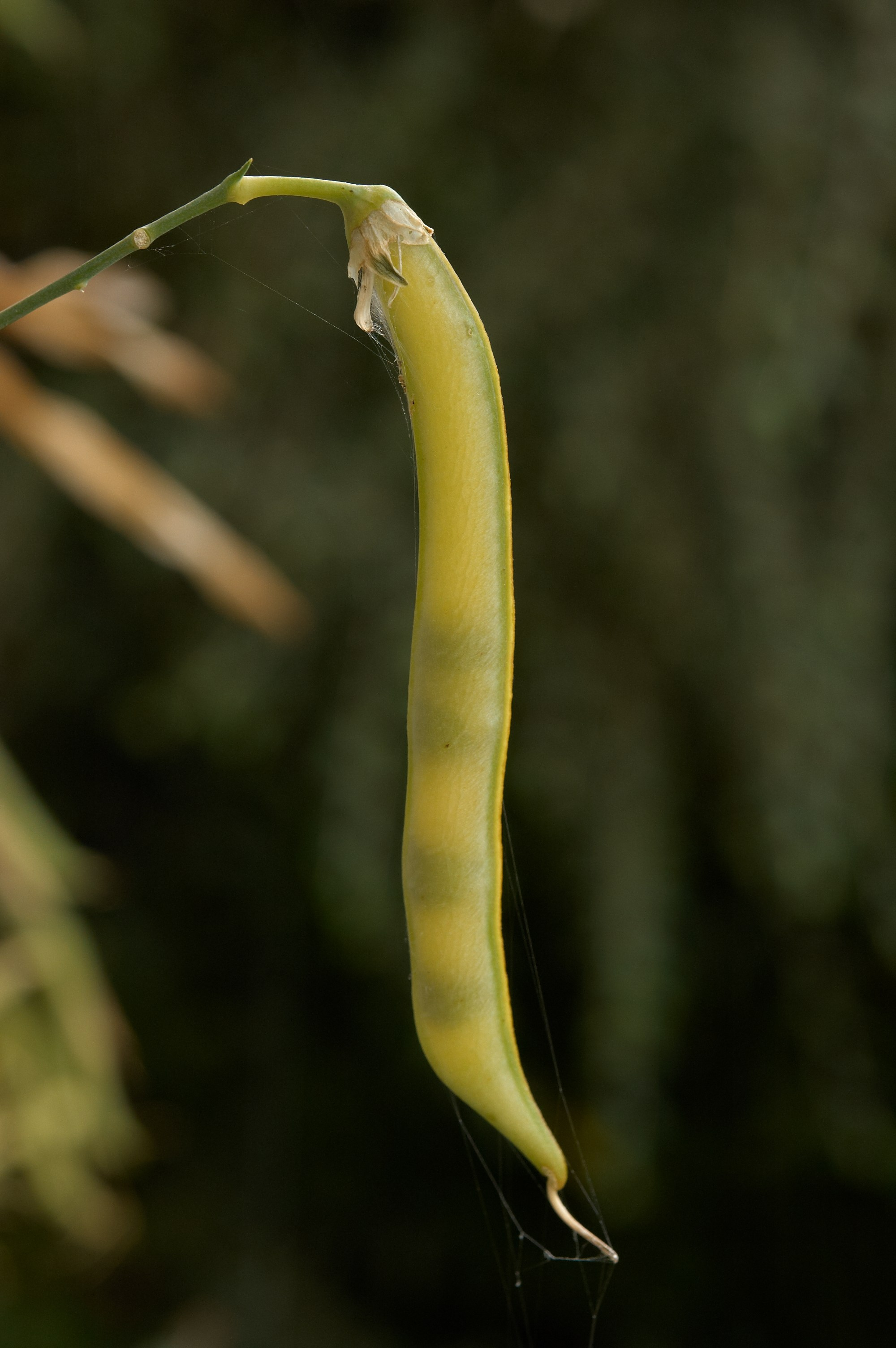
Lathyrus latifolius 'Pink Pearl'

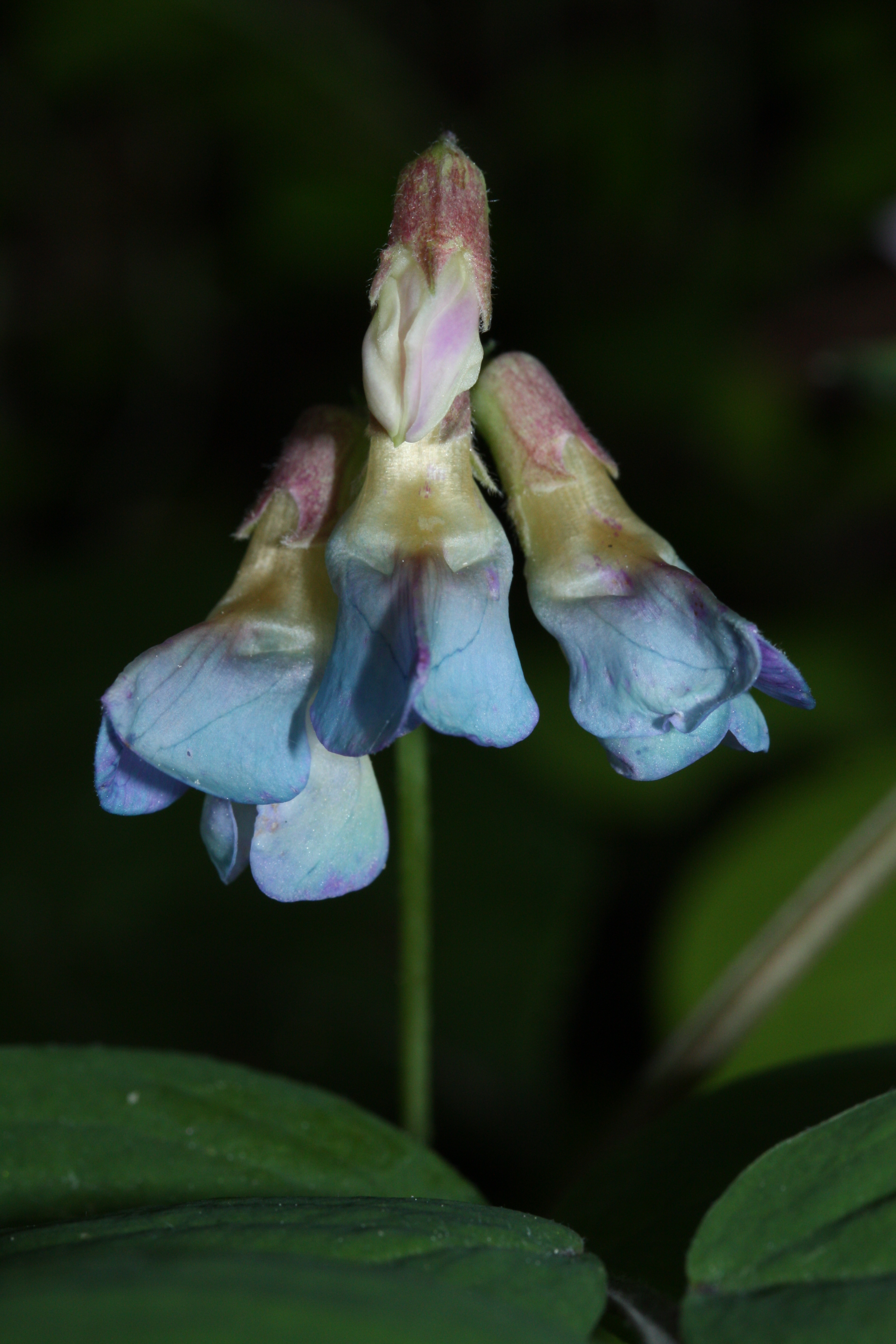
Lathyrus nevadensis ssp. nevadensis

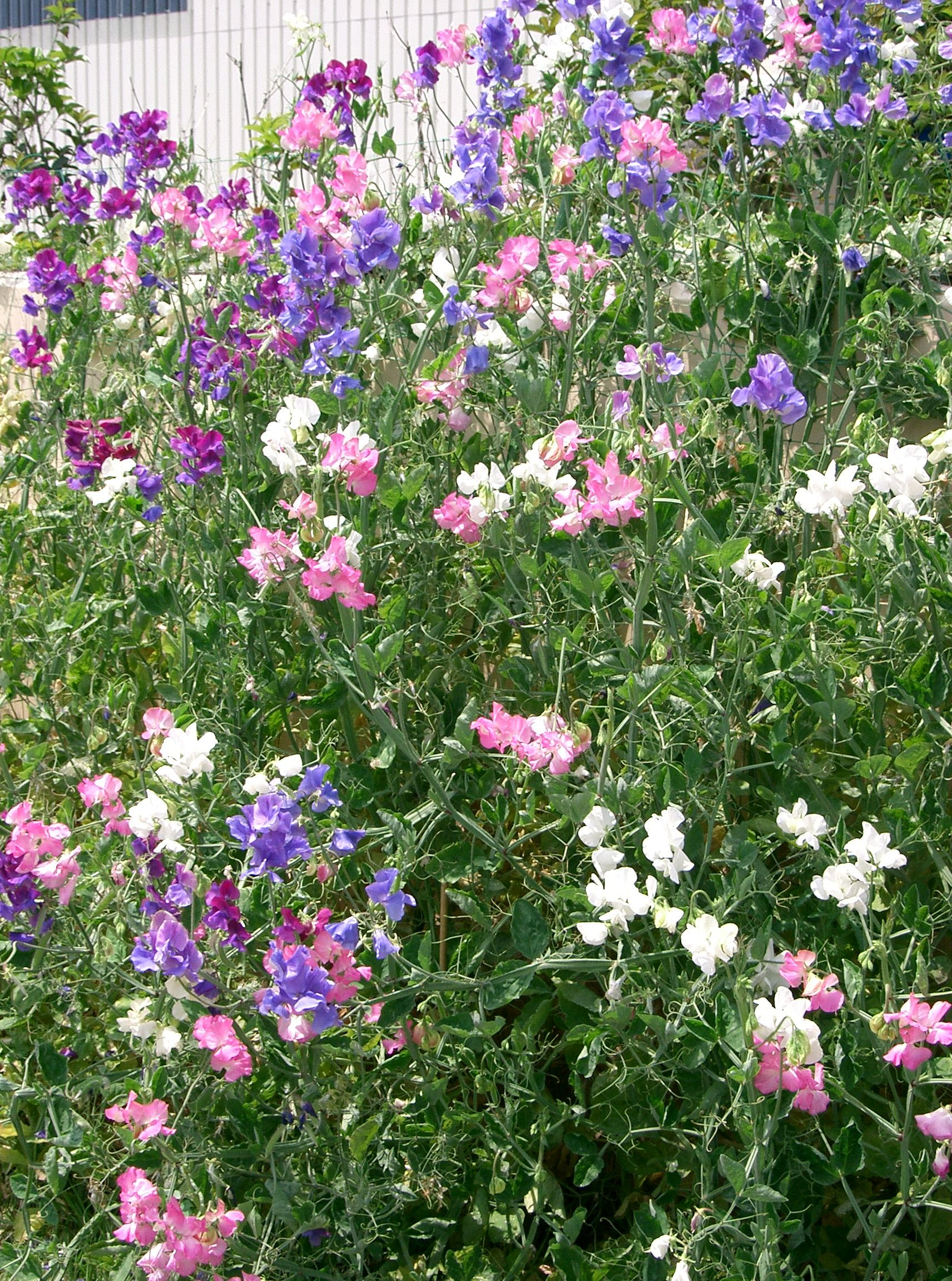
Lathyrus odoratus, sweet pea mixture

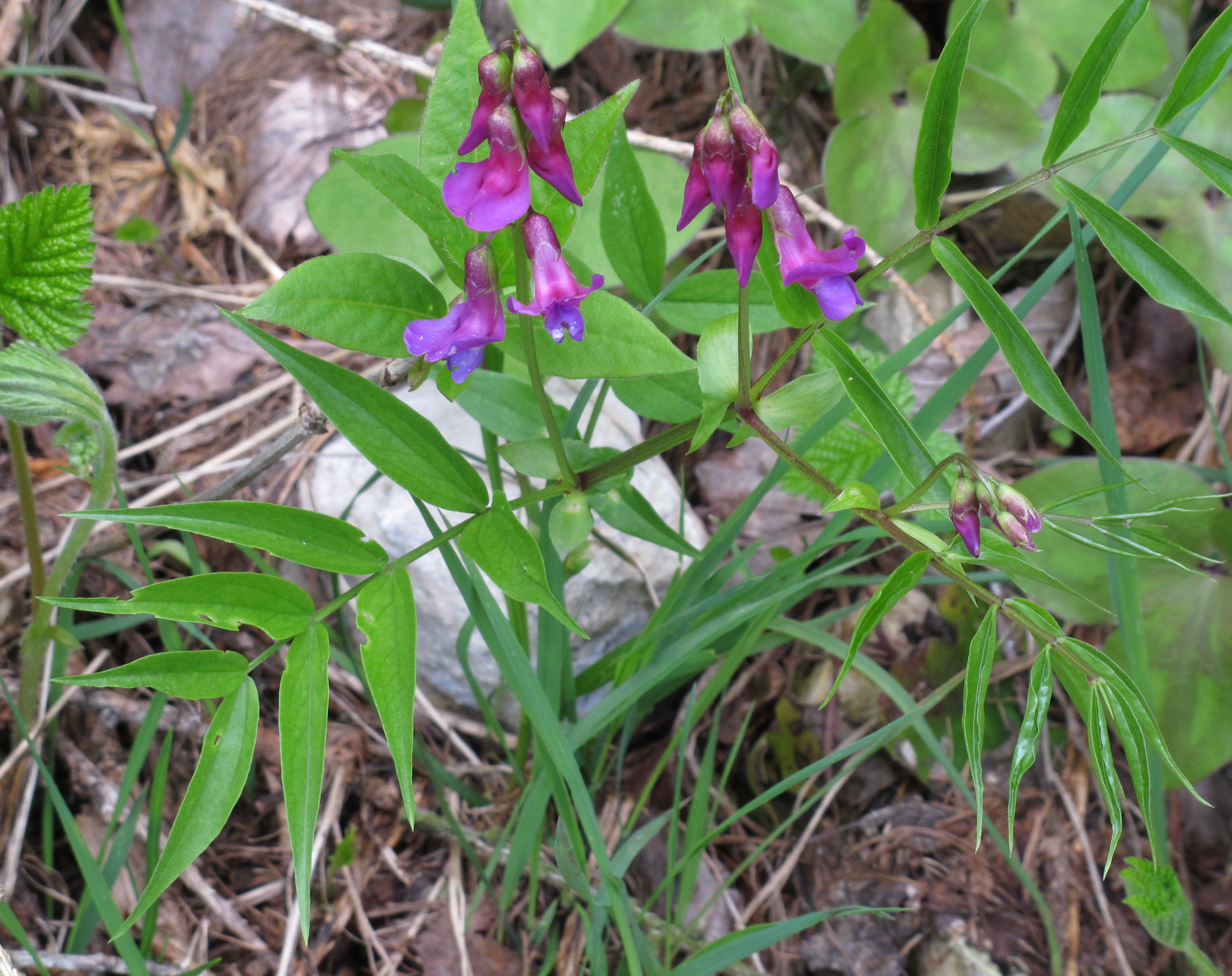
Lathyrus vernus, spring pea

According to Plants of the World Online there are 183 accepted species.

- Lathyrus acutifolius Vogel
- Lathyrus alamutensis Mozaff., Ahavazi & Charkhch.
- Lathyrus alpestris (Waldst. & Kit.) Kit.
- Lathyrus amphicarpos L.
- Lathyrus angulatus L.
- Lathyrus anhuiensis Y.J.Zhu & R.X.Meng
- Lathyrus annuus L.
- Lathyrus apenninus F.Conti
- Lathyrus aphaca L.
- Lathyrus armenus (Boiss. & A.Huet) Čelak.
- Lathyrus articulatus L.
- Lathyrus atropatanus (Grossh.) Širj.
- Lathyrus aureus (G.Lodd. ex Drapiez) D.Brândză
- Lathyrus basalticus Rech.f.
- Lathyrus bauhini P.A.Genty
- Lathyrus belinensis Maxted & Goyder
- Lathyrus berteroanus Colla
- Lathyrus biflorus T.W.Nelson & J.P.Nelson
- Lathyrus bijugus Boiss. & Noë
- Lathyrus binatus Pančić
- Lathyrus bitlisicus Peșmen & Güner
- Lathyrus blepharicarpos Boiss.
- Lathyrus boissieri Širj.
- Lathyrus brachycalyx Rydb.
- Lathyrus brachyodon Murb.
- Lathyrus brachypterus Čelak.
- Lathyrus brownii Eastw.
- Lathyrus cabreranus Burkart
- Lathyrus campestris Phil.
- Lathyrus cassius Boiss.
- Lathyrus caudatus C.F.Wei & H.P.Tsui
- Lathyrus chloranthus Boiss. & Balansa
- Lathyrus chrysanthus Boiss.
- Lathyrus cicera L.
- Lathyrus ciliatidentatus Czefr.
- Lathyrus cilicicus Hayek & Siehe
- Lathyrus ciliolatus Sam. ex Rech.f.
- Lathyrus cirpicii Güneş
- Lathyrus cirrhosus Ser.
- Lathyrus clymenum L.
- Lathyrus colchicus Lipsky
- Lathyrus crassipes Gillies ex Hook. & Arn.
- Lathyrus cyaneus (Steven) K.Koch
- Lathyrus czeczottianus Bässler
- Lathyrus davidii Hance
- Lathyrus decaphyllus Pursh
- Lathyrus delnorticus C.L.Hitchc.
- Lathyrus dielsianus Harms
- Lathyrus digitatus (M.Bieb.) Fiori
- Lathyrus elegans Vogel
- Lathyrus elongatus (Bornm.) Širj.
- Lathyrus emodi (Wall. ex Fritsch) Fritsch ex T.Durand & B.D.Jacks.
- Lathyrus eucosmus Butters & H.St.John
- Lathyrus filiformis (Lam.) J.Gay
- Lathyrus fissus Ball
- Lathyrus formosus (Steven) Kenicer
- Lathyrus frolovii Fisch. ex Rupr.
- Lathyrus fulvus (Sm.) Kosterin
- Lathyrus glandulosus Broich
- Lathyrus gloeosperma Warb. & Eig
- Lathyrus gmelinii (Fisch. ex Ser.) Fritsch
- Lathyrus golanensis O.Cohen & Plitmann
- Lathyrus gorgoni Parl.
- Lathyrus graminifolius (S.Watson) T.G.White
- Lathyrus grandiflorus Sm.
- Lathyrus grimesii Barneby
- Lathyrus hallersteinii Baumg.
- Lathyrus hasslerianus Burkart
- Lathyrus heterophyllus L.
- Lathyrus hierosolymitanus Boiss.
- Lathyrus hirsutus L.
- Lathyrus hirticarpus Mattatia & Heyn
- Lathyrus hitchcockianus Barneby & Reveal
- Lathyrus holochlorus (Piper) C.L.Hitchc.
- Lathyrus hookeri G.Don
- Lathyrus humilis (Ser.) Fisch. ex Spreng.
- Lathyrus hygrophilus Taub.
- Lathyrus inconspicuus L.
- Lathyrus incurvus (Roth) Willd.
- Lathyrus japonicus Willd.
- Lathyrus jepsonii Greene
- Lathyrus karsianus P.H.Davis
- Lathyrus ketzkhovelii Avazneli
- Lathyrus komarovii Ohwi
- Lathyrus krylovii Serg.
- Lathyrus laetivirens Greene ex Rydb.
- Lathyrus laevigatus (Waldst. & Kit.) Gren.
- Lathyrus lanszwertii Kellogg
- Lathyrus latidentatus Elenevsky
- Lathyrus latifolius L.
- Lathyrus laxiflorus (Desf.) Kuntze
- Lathyrus layardii Ball ex Boiss
- Lathyrus ledebourii Trautv.
- Lathyrus lentiformis Plitmann
- Lathyrus leptophyllus M.Bieb.
- Lathyrus libani Fritsch
- Lathyrus linearifolius Vogel
- Lathyrus linifolius (Reichard) Bässler
- Lathyrus littoralis (Nutt.) Endl. ex Walp.
- Lathyrus lomanus I.M.Johnst.
- Lathyrus lycicus Boiss. & Heldr.
- Lathyrus macropus Gillies ex Hook. & Arn.
- Lathyrus macrostachys Vogel
- Lathyrus magellanicus Lam.
- Lathyrus marmoratus Boiss. & Balansa
- Lathyrus meridensis Pittier
- Lathyrus miniatus M.Bieb. ex Steven
- Lathyrus mulkak Lipsky
- Lathyrus multiceps Clos
- Lathyrus multijugus (Ledeb.) Czefr.
- Lathyrus nervosus Lam.
- Lathyrus neurolobus Boiss. & Heldr.
- Lathyrus nevadensis S.Watson
- Lathyrus niger (L.) Bernh.
- Lathyrus nigrivalvis Burkart
- Lathyrus nissolia L.
- Lathyrus nitens Vogel
- Lathyrus nivalis Hand.-Mazz.
- Lathyrus numidicus Batt.
- Lathyrus ochraceus Kitt.
- Lathyrus ochroleucus Hook.
- Lathyrus ochrus (L.) DC.
- Lathyrus odoratus L.
- Lathyrus oleraceus Lam.
- Lathyrus pallescens (M.Bieb.) K.Koch
- Lathyrus palustris L.
- Lathyrus pancicii (Jurišić) Adamović
- Lathyrus pannonicus (Jacq.) Garcke
- Lathyrus paraguariensis Hassl.
- Lathyrus paranensis Burkart
- Lathyrus parodii Burkart
- Lathyrus pauciflorus Fernald
- Lathyrus pisiformis L.
- Lathyrus plitmannii Greuter & Burdet
- Lathyrus polyphyllus Nutt.
- Lathyrus pratensis L.
- Lathyrus pseudocicera Pamp.
- Lathyrus pubescens Hook. & Arn.
- Lathyrus pusillus Elliott
- Lathyrus pygmaeus Gomb.
- Lathyrus quinquenervius (Miq.) Litv.
- Lathyrus rigidus T.G.White
- Lathyrus roseus Steven
- Lathyrus rotundifolius Willd.
- Lathyrus satdaghensis P.H.Davis
- Lathyrus sativus L.
- Lathyrus saxatilis (Vent.) Vis.
- Lathyrus sericeus Lam.
- Lathyrus setifolius L.
- Lathyrus spathulatus Čelak.
- Lathyrus speciosus G.Don
- Lathyrus sphaericus Retz.
- Lathyrus splendens Kellogg
- Lathyrus stenolobus Boiss.
- Lathyrus stenophyllus Boiss. & Heldr.
- Lathyrus subandinus Phil.
- Lathyrus subulatus Lam.
- Lathyrus sulphureus W.H.Brewer ex A.Gray
- Lathyrus sylvestris L.
- Lathyrus tauricola P.H.Davis
- Lathyrus tefennicus Genç & Sahin
- Lathyrus tingitanus L.
- Lathyrus torreyi A.Gray
- Lathyrus × tournefortii (Lapeyr.) A.W.Hill
- Lathyrus trachycarpus (Boiss.) Boiss.
- Lathyrus tracyi Bradshaw
- Lathyrus transsylvanicus (Spreng.) Rchb.f.
- Lathyrus tremolsianus Pau
- Lathyrus tropicalandinus Burkart
- Lathyrus tuberosus L.
- Lathyrus tukhtensis Czeczott
- Lathyrus turcicus Hamzaoğlu
- Lathyrus undulatus Boiss.
- Lathyrus vaniotii H.Lév.
- Lathyrus variabilis (Boiss. & Kotschy) Čelak.
- Lathyrus venetus (Mill.) Wohlf.
- Lathyrus venosus Muhl. ex Willd.
- Lathyrus vernus (L.) Bernh.
- Lathyrus vestitus Nutt.
- Lathyrus vinealis Boiss. & Noë
- Lathyrus vivantii P.Monts.
- Lathyrus whitei Kupicha
- Lathyrus woronowii Bornm.
- Lathyrus zalaghensis Andr.

== Ecology ==
Lathyrus species are used as food plants by the larvae of some Lepidoptera species, including the grey chi (Antitype chi) and the latticed heath (Chiasmia clathrata), both recorded on meadow vetchling (Lathyrus pratensis), and Chionodes braunella. Lathyrus growth abundance and size both decrease in response to increased temperatures in montane meadows.

== Uses ==
Several species are grown for food, including the pea (Lathyrus oleraceus), Indian pea (L. sativus), and the red pea (L. cicera), and less commonly cyprus-vetch (L. ochrus) and Spanish vetchling (L. clymenum). The tuberous pea (L. tuberosus) is grown as a root vegetable for its starchy edible tuber. The seeds of some Lathyrus species contain the toxic amino acid oxalyldiaminopropionic acid and if eaten in large quantities can cause lathyrism, a serious disease.

Many species are cultivated as garden plants. The genus includes the garden sweet pea (Lathyrus odoratus) and the perennial everlasting pea (Lathyrus latifolius). Flowers on these cultivated species may be rose, red, maroon, pink, white, yellow, purple or blue, and some are bicolored. They are also grown for their fragrance. Cultivated species are susceptible to fungal infections including downy and powdery mildew.
