= Lathyrus magellanicus =

Scientific classification
- Kingdom: Plantae
- Clade: Tracheophytes
- Clade: Angiosperms
- Clade: Eudicots
- Clade: Rosids
- Order: Fabales
- Family: Fabaceae
- Subfamily: Faboideae
- Genus: Lathyrus
- Species: L. magellanicus

Binomial name
- Lathyrus magellanicus Lam

Synonyms
- Lathyrus magellanicus var. normalis Kuntze 1898; Orobus magellanicus (Lam.) Alef. 1861

Species of plant

Lathyrus magellanicus is a species of Lathyrus found in Argentina, Bolivia, Chile, Colombia, Ecuador, Peru, and Uruguay.
