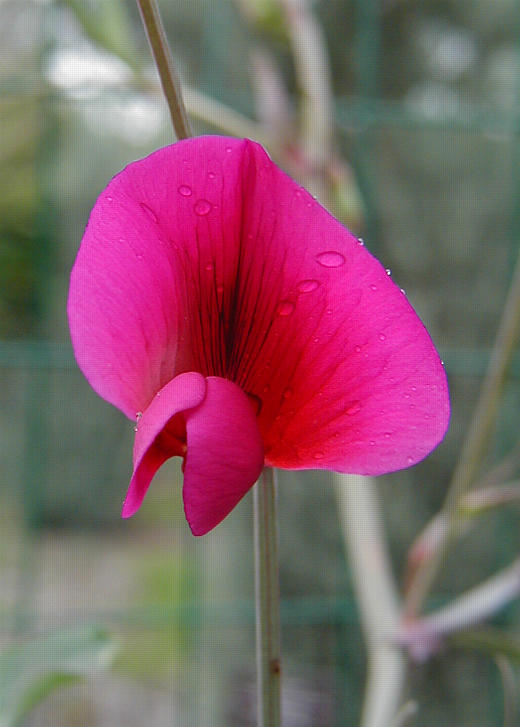

Conservation status
- Least Concern (IUCN 3.1)

Scientific classification
- Kingdom: Plantae
- Clade: Tracheophytes
- Clade: Angiosperms
- Clade: Eudicots
- Clade: Rosids
- Order: Fabales
- Family: Fabaceae
- Subfamily: Faboideae
- Genus: Lathyrus
- Species: L. tingitanus

Binomial name
- Lathyrus tingitanus L.

= Lathyrus tingitanus =

Species of legume

Lathyrus tingitanus is a species of wild pea known by the common name Tangier pea. It is native to southwestern Europe and Northwest Africa, and it is present in other regions of the world as an introduced species, including the Pacific Northwest of the United States. This is an annual herb producing a winged stem which climbs by means of coiled tendrils. The leaves are each made up of two leaflike linear leaflets a few centimeters long. The inflorescence has two or three pea flowers in varying shades of red, each up to 3 centimetres (1.2 in) wide. The fruit is a hairless dehiscent legume pod.
