= Lathyrus incurvus =

Scientific classification
- Kingdom: Plantae
- Clade: Tracheophytes
- Clade: Angiosperms
- Clade: Eudicots
- Clade: Rosids
- Order: Fabales
- Family: Fabaceae
- Subfamily: Faboideae
- Genus: Lathyrus
- Species: L. incurvus

Binomial name
- Lathyrus incurvus (Roth) Willd.

Synonyms
- Orobus incurvus (Roth) A.Braun 1853; Vicia incurva Roth 1783; Lathyrus curvus Roth 1787

Species of plant

Lathyrus incurvus is a species of Lathyrus found in Russia, Iran, Kazakhstan, Turkey, and Ukraine.
