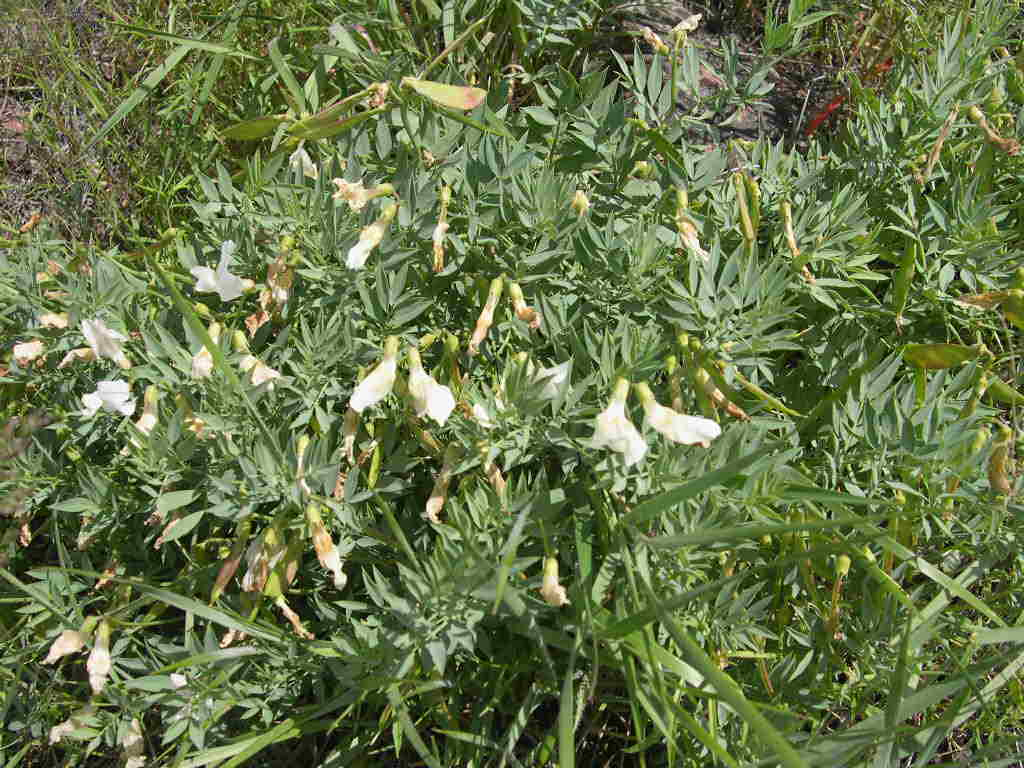

Conservation status
- Secure (NatureServe)

Scientific classification
- Kingdom: Plantae
- Clade: Tracheophytes
- Clade: Angiosperms
- Clade: Eudicots
- Clade: Rosids
- Order: Fabales
- Family: Fabaceae
- Subfamily: Faboideae
- Genus: Lathyrus
- Species: L. rigidus

Binomial name
- Lathyrus rigidus T.G.White

Synonyms
- Lathyrus albus S.Watson

= Lathyrus rigidus =

Plant species in the pea family

Lathyrus rigidus is a species of wild pea known by the common name stiff pea. It is native to the Modoc Plateau and surrounding areas in the western United States from northeastern California to Idaho. It is a plant of the sagebrush scrub and other habitat in the region. This is a perennial herb forming a clump of short, erect stems. The leaves are made up of several pairs of leaflets 1 to 3 centimeters (0.4 to 1.2 in) long each. The inflorescence is a dense raceme of two to five white or pink pea flowers, each roughly 2 cm (0.8 in) long. The fruit is a hairless legume pod.

== Taxonomy ==
Lathyrus rigidus was scientifically described as part of the Lathyrus genus in 1894 by Theodore Greely White. Alongside the rest of its genus it is classified in the Fabaceae family. The species has no subspecies and one heterotypic synonym, Lathyrus albus published in 1880 by Sereno Watson, but an illegitimate name due to the prior use.

== Range ==
Stiff peas are native to four western US states, California, Oregon, Idaho, and Nevada.
