= Lathyrus pygmaeus =

Conservation status
- Data Deficient (IUCN 3.1)

Scientific classification
- Kingdom: Plantae
- Clade: Tracheophytes
- Clade: Angiosperms
- Clade: Eudicots
- Clade: Rosids
- Order: Fabales
- Family: Fabaceae
- Subfamily: Faboideae
- Genus: Lathyrus
- Species: L. pygmaeus

Binomial name
- Lathyrus pygmaeus Gomb.

Species of legume

Lathyrus pygmaeus is a legume that is native to Jordan, Lebanon, and Syria. This species seems to be of an unknown specific distribution and more research may be needed, since much information is Data deficient.
