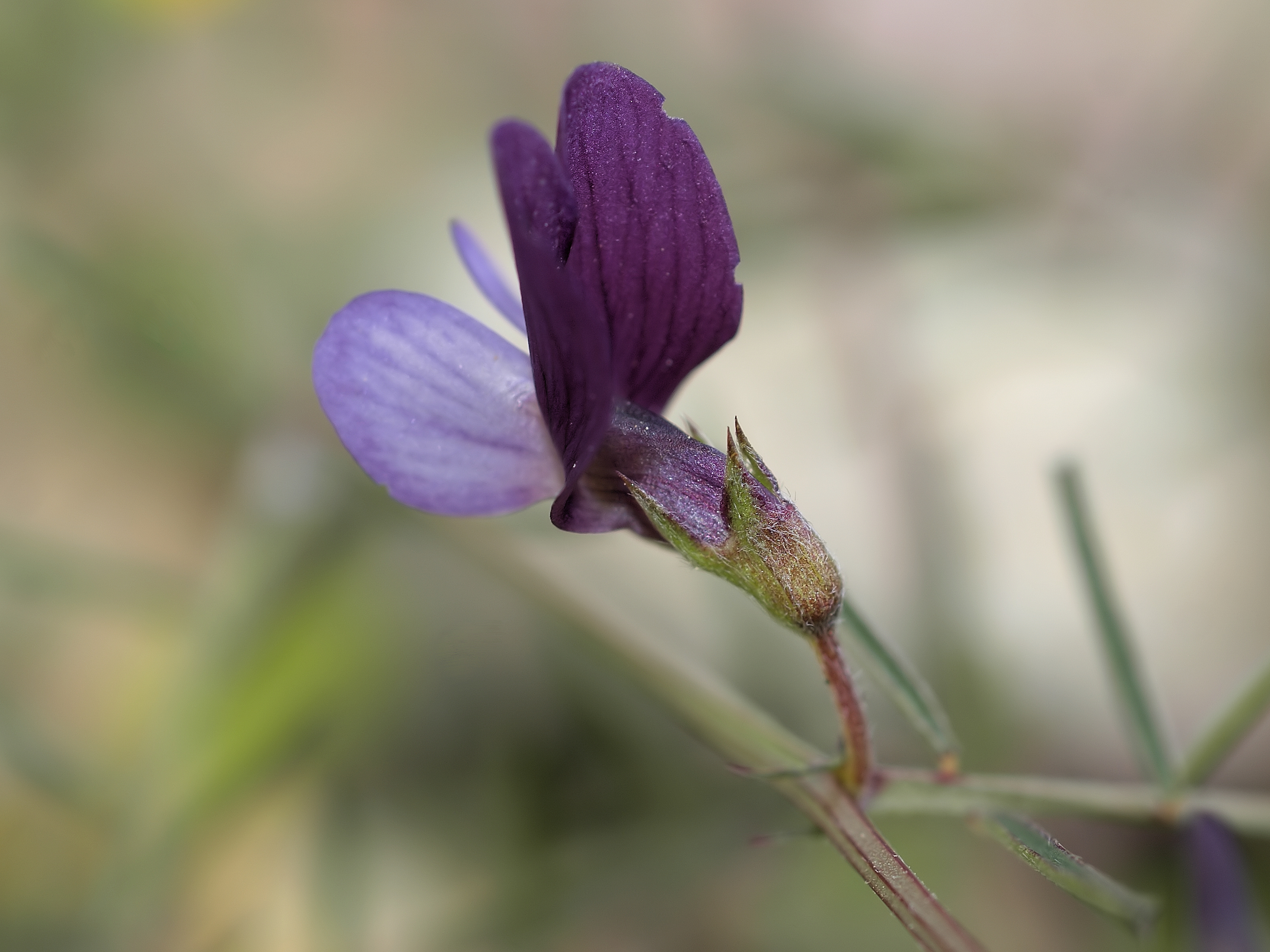

Scientific classification
- Kingdom: Plantae
- Clade: Tracheophytes
- Clade: Angiosperms
- Clade: Eudicots
- Clade: Rosids
- Order: Fabales
- Family: Fabaceae
- Subfamily: Faboideae
- Genus: Lathyrus
- Species: L. angulatus

Binomial name
- Lathyrus angulatus L.

= Lathyrus angulatus =

Species of legume

Lathyrus angulatus is a species of wild pea known by the common name angled pea.

It is native to southern Europe and North Africa, and it is known from elsewhere as an introduced species.

This is an annual herb with a flanged, hairless stem. Each leaf is made up of two leaflike leaflets each a few centimeters long and very narrow. It has tiny coiling tendrils. The inflorescence holds a solitary flower on a long bristle-tipped peduncle with the flower situated midway. The purple pea flower is about a centimeter wide. The fruit is a hairless dehiscent legume pod.
