= Lathyrus cyaneus =

Scientific classification
- Kingdom: Plantae
- Clade: Tracheophytes
- Clade: Angiosperms
- Clade: Eudicots
- Clade: Rosids
- Order: Fabales
- Family: Fabaceae
- Subfamily: Faboideae
- Genus: Lathyrus
- Species: L. cyaneus

Binomial name
- Lathyrus cyaneus (Steven) K.Koch

Synonyms
- Orobus cyaneus Steven 1813; Platystylis cyanea (Steven) Sweet 1828

Species of plant

Lathyrus cyaneus is a species of peavine found in Iran and Turkey.
