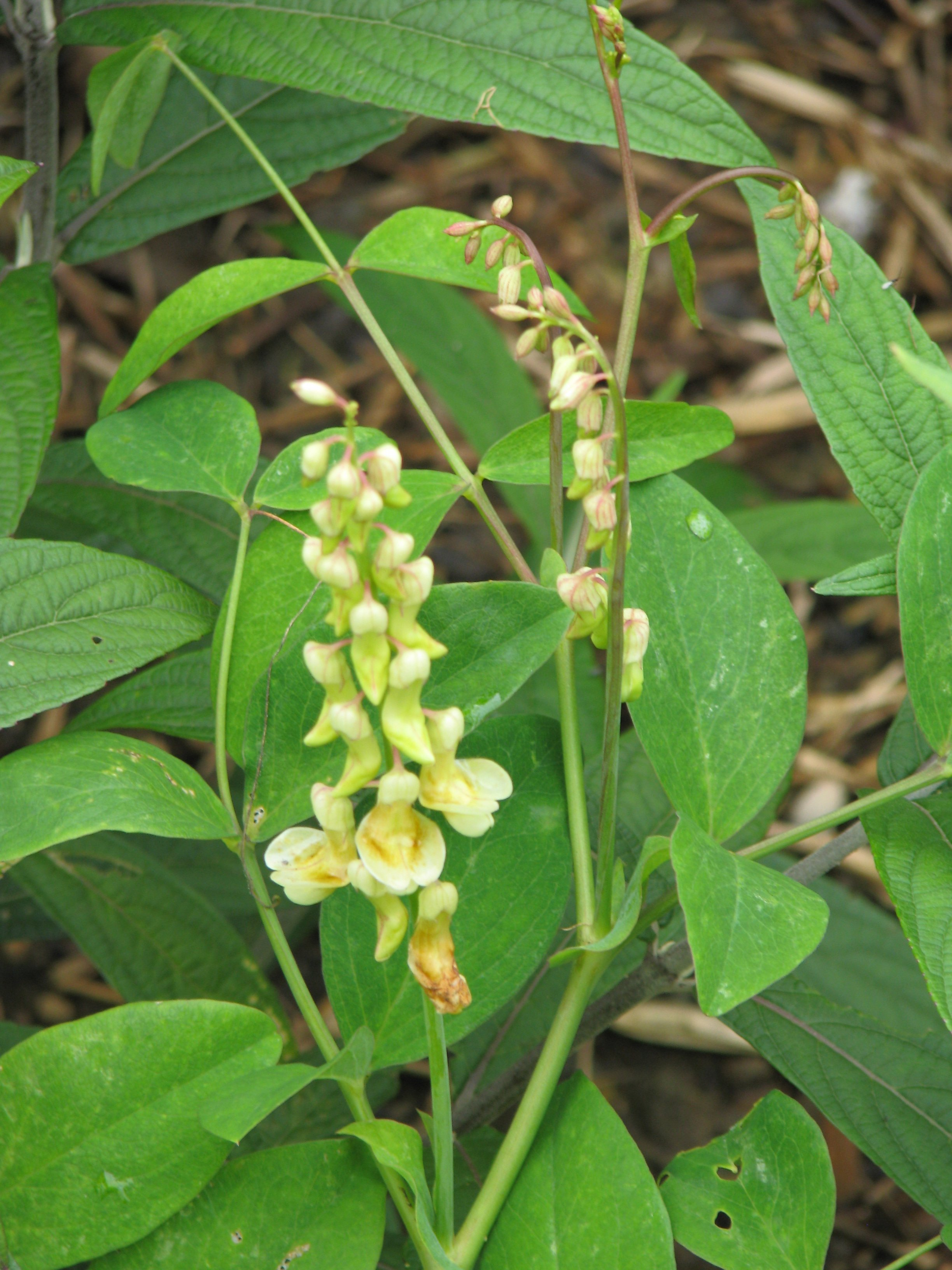

Scientific classification
- Kingdom: Plantae
- Clade: Tracheophytes
- Clade: Angiosperms
- Clade: Eudicots
- Clade: Rosids
- Order: Fabales
- Family: Fabaceae
- Subfamily: Faboideae
- Genus: Lathyrus
- Species: L. davidii

Binomial name
- Lathyrus davidii Hance

Synonyms
- Orobus davidii (Hance) Stank. & Roskov 1998; Lathyrus davidii f. kaiensis Hiyama 1951

= Lathyrus davidii =

Species of plant

Lathyrus davidii is a species of peavine found in Russian, China, Korea, and Japan.
