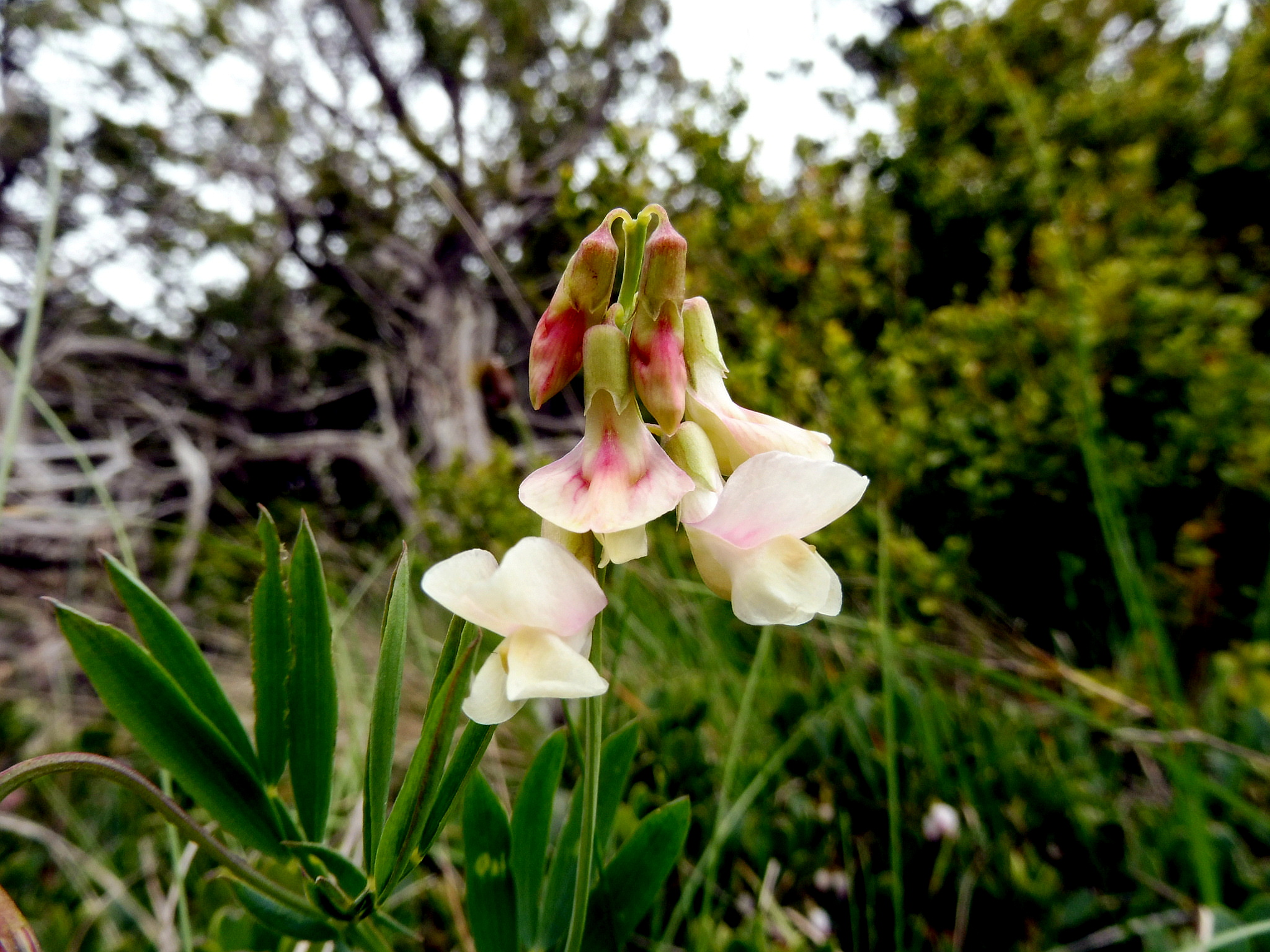

Scientific classification
- Kingdom: Plantae
- Clade: Tracheophytes
- Clade: Angiosperms
- Clade: Eudicots
- Clade: Rosids
- Order: Fabales
- Family: Fabaceae
- Subfamily: Faboideae
- Genus: Lathyrus
- Species: L. pannonicus

Binomial name
- Lathyrus pannonicus (Jacq.) Garcke

Synonyms
- Lathyrus albus var. pannonicus (Jacq.) Čelak. 1897; Lathyrus albus subvar. pannonicus (Jacq.) Čelak. 1897; Orobus pannonicus Jacq. 1762; Pisum pannonicum (Jacq.) E.H.L.Krause 1901

= Lathyrus pannonicus =

Species of plant

Lathyrus pannonicus is a species of Lathyrus found in Eastern and Western Europe.
