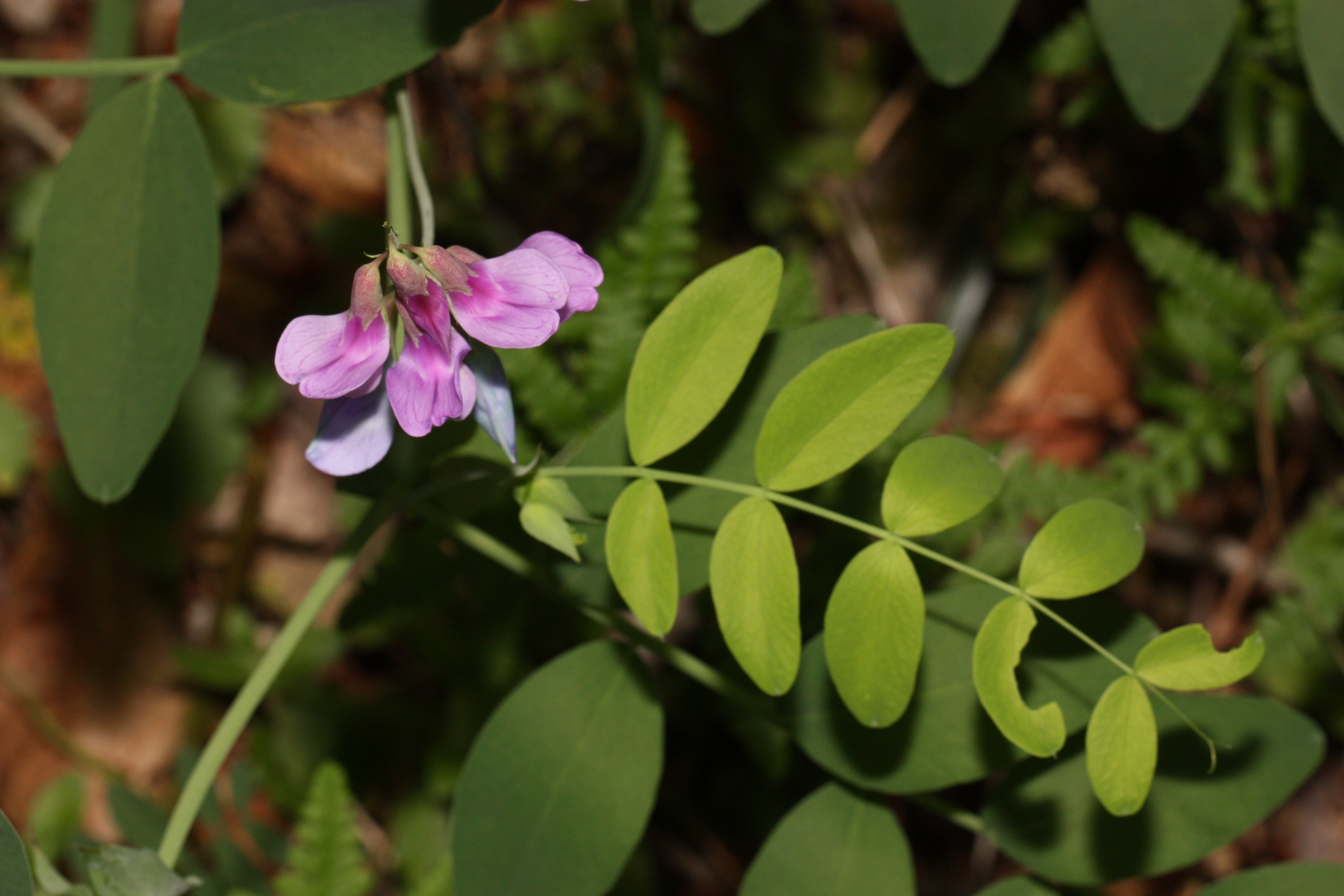

Conservation status
- Secure (NatureServe)

Scientific classification
- Kingdom: Plantae
- Clade: Tracheophytes
- Clade: Angiosperms
- Clade: Eudicots
- Clade: Rosids
- Order: Fabales
- Family: Fabaceae
- Subfamily: Faboideae
- Genus: Lathyrus
- Species: L. polyphyllus

Binomial name
- Lathyrus polyphyllus Nutt.

Synonyms
- Lathyrus ecirrhosus A.Heller

= Lathyrus polyphyllus =

Plant species in the pea family

Lathyrus polyphyllus is a species of wild pea known by the common name leafy pea. It is native to the western United States from Washington to northern California, where it grows in forest and other habitat. This is a perennial herb with long leaves each made up of many pairs of oval-shaped leaflets a few centimeters long. The leaf also has tendrils which may be long, branched and coiled, or just a short bristle. The stipules are large as well, often over a centimeter wide. The plant produces an inflorescence of up to 12 pea flowers usually arranged in a line along one side of the stem. The flowers are up to 2 centimeters wide and are a variety of shades of purple. The fruit is a dehiscent legume pod containing peas.

== Taxonomy ==
The scientific name Lathyrus polyphyllus was published in 1838 by the botanist Thomas Nuttall. It is part of the Lathyrus within the wider Fabaceae family. The species has no subspecies and one botanical synonym, Lathyrus ecirrhosus, published in 1904 by Amos Arthur Heller, but nomen illegitimum due to prior publication.

== Range ==
The leafy pea is native to northwestern California, western Oregon, and western Washington.
