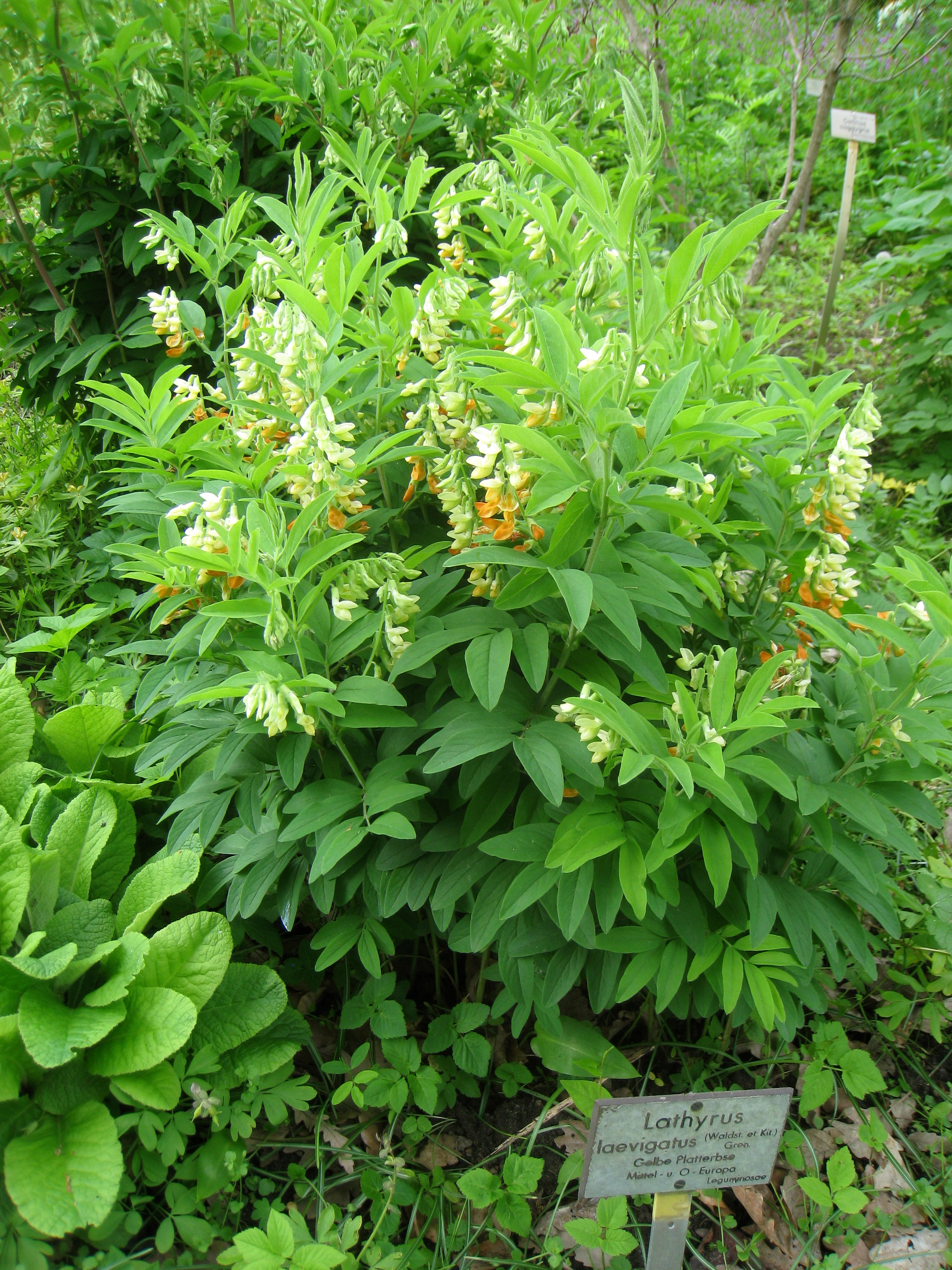

Scientific classification
- Kingdom: Plantae
- Clade: Tracheophytes
- Clade: Angiosperms
- Clade: Eudicots
- Clade: Rosids
- Order: Fabales
- Family: Fabaceae
- Subfamily: Faboideae
- Genus: Lathyrus
- Species: L. laevigatus

Binomial name
- Lathyrus laevigatus (Waldst. & Kit.) Gren.

Synonyms
- Orobus ewaldii Meinsh.; Orobus laevigatus Waldst. & Kit.

= Lathyrus laevigatus =

Species of legume

Lathyrus laevigatus is a flowering plant of the genus Lathyrus in the legume family Fabaceae. It is native to middle, eastern, and southeastern Europe.
