= Lathyrus biflorus =

- Plant with flower

Conservation status
- Critically Imperiled (NatureServe)

Scientific classification
- Kingdom: Plantae
- Clade: Tracheophytes
- Clade: Angiosperms
- Clade: Eudicots
- Clade: Rosids
- Order: Fabales
- Family: Fabaceae
- Subfamily: Faboideae
- Genus: Lathyrus
- Species: L. biflorus

Binomial name
- Lathyrus biflorus T.W.Nelson & J.P.Nelson

Plant species in the pea family

Lathyrus biflorus is a rare species of wild pea known by the common name two-flowered sweet pea. It only grows in Humboldt County, California. It is a member of the serpentine soils flora. This is a petite perennial herb growing thin, tough, fuzzy stems with leaves each made up of two pairs of small linear leaflets. There are tiny bristlelike tendrils. The inflorescence bears two greenish-white pea flowers each up to a centimeter wide. The fruit is a hairless dehiscent legume pod.

== Taxonomy ==
Lathyrus biflorus was not scientifically described until 1983, when Thomas W. Nelson and Jane P. Nelson published a paper in the journal Brittonia. It is classified in the Lathyrus genus as part of the Fabaceae family and has no botanical synonyms.

== Range ==
The two-flowered sweet pea is endemic to just southeastern Humboldt County in California. There it grows on outcrops of serpentine in Jeffrey pine woodlands at elevations of 1,300–1,400 meters (4,300–4,600 ft).
