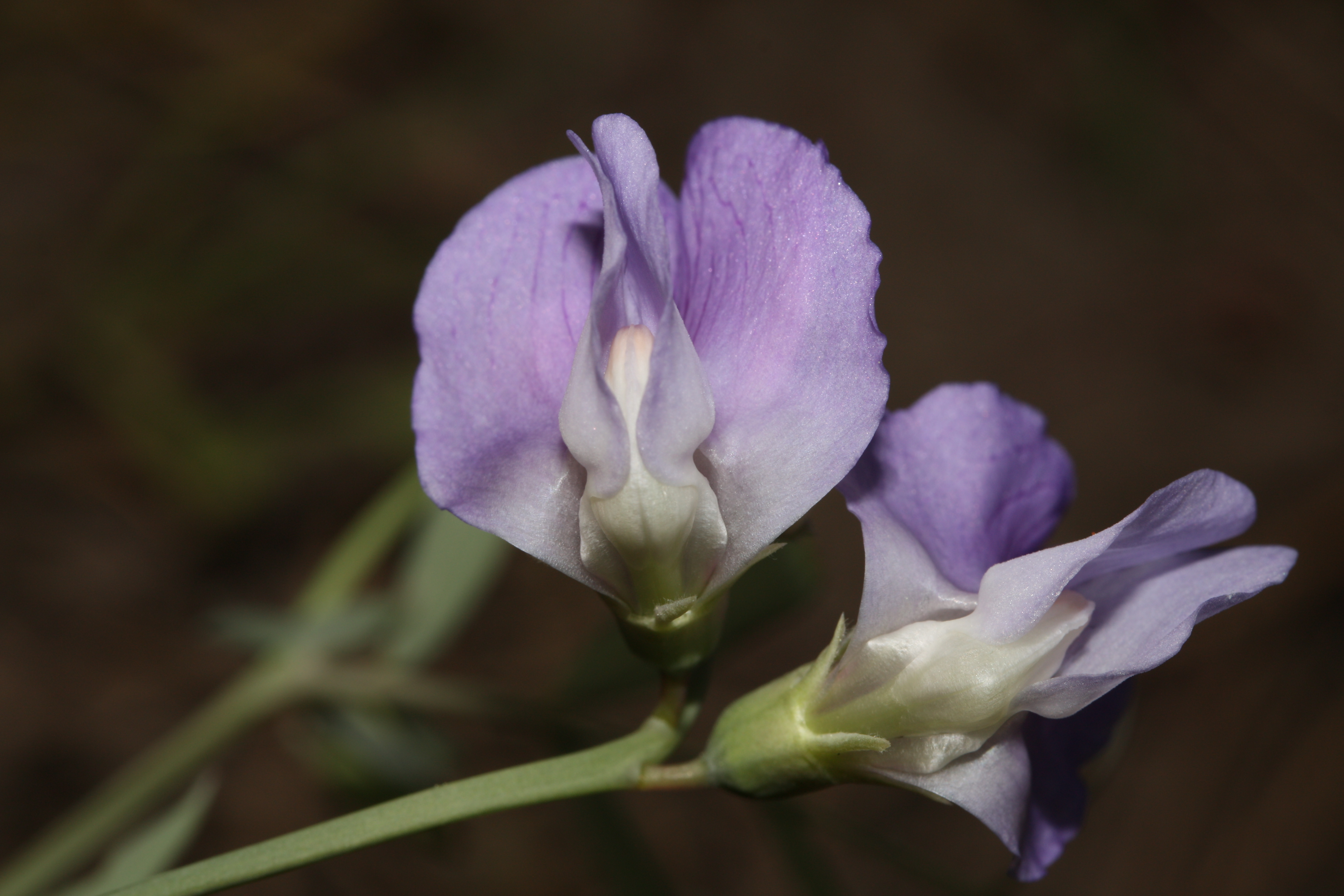

Conservation status
- Secure (NatureServe)

Scientific classification
- Kingdom: Plantae
- Clade: Tracheophytes
- Clade: Angiosperms
- Clade: Eudicots
- Clade: Rosids
- Order: Fabales
- Family: Fabaceae
- Subfamily: Faboideae
- Genus: Lathyrus
- Species: L. pauciflorus

Binomial name
- Lathyrus pauciflorus Fernald

Varieties
- Lathyrus pauciflorus var. pauciflorus; Lathyrus pauciflorus var. utahensis (M.E.Jones) M.Peck

= Lathyrus pauciflorus =

Plant species in the pea family

Lathyrus pauciflorus, known by the common name of few flowered peavine, is a perennial plant species in the Fabaceae family.

== Description ==
The flowers are blue to purple, blooming early in spring, usually growing to at least 18 millimeters. The leaves are mostly greater than 3 centimeters. The keel is 2–4 mm shorter than the wing petals.

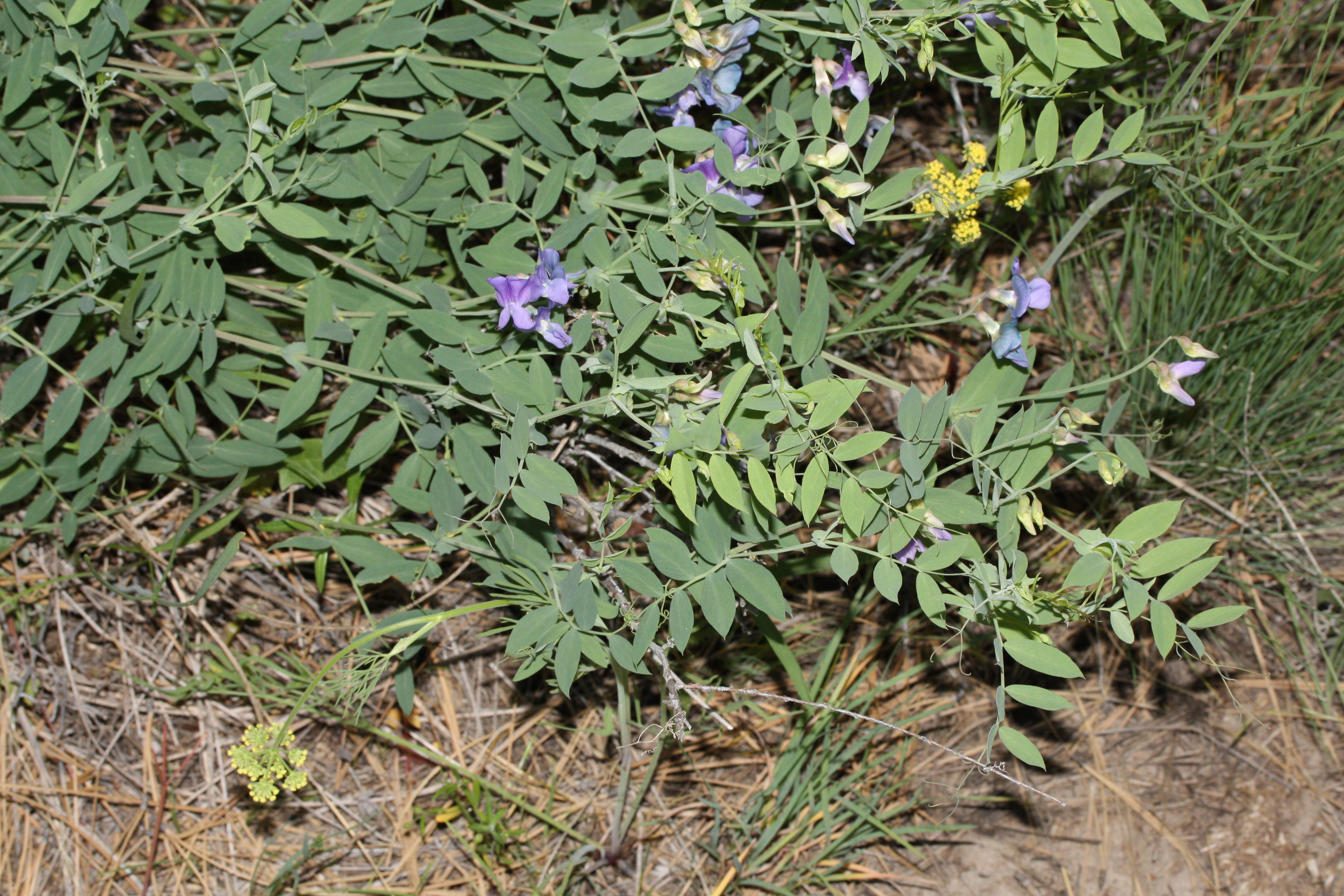
Lathyrus pauciflorus 9730

== Distribution ==
According to Plants of the World Online few flowered peavines are native to five western states, Washington, Oregon, Idaho, Utah, and Colorado. In Washington it grows at lower elevations from sagebrush desert to Ponderosa pine forests east of the Cascade crest. It is also widespread in eastern Oregon and western Idaho.
