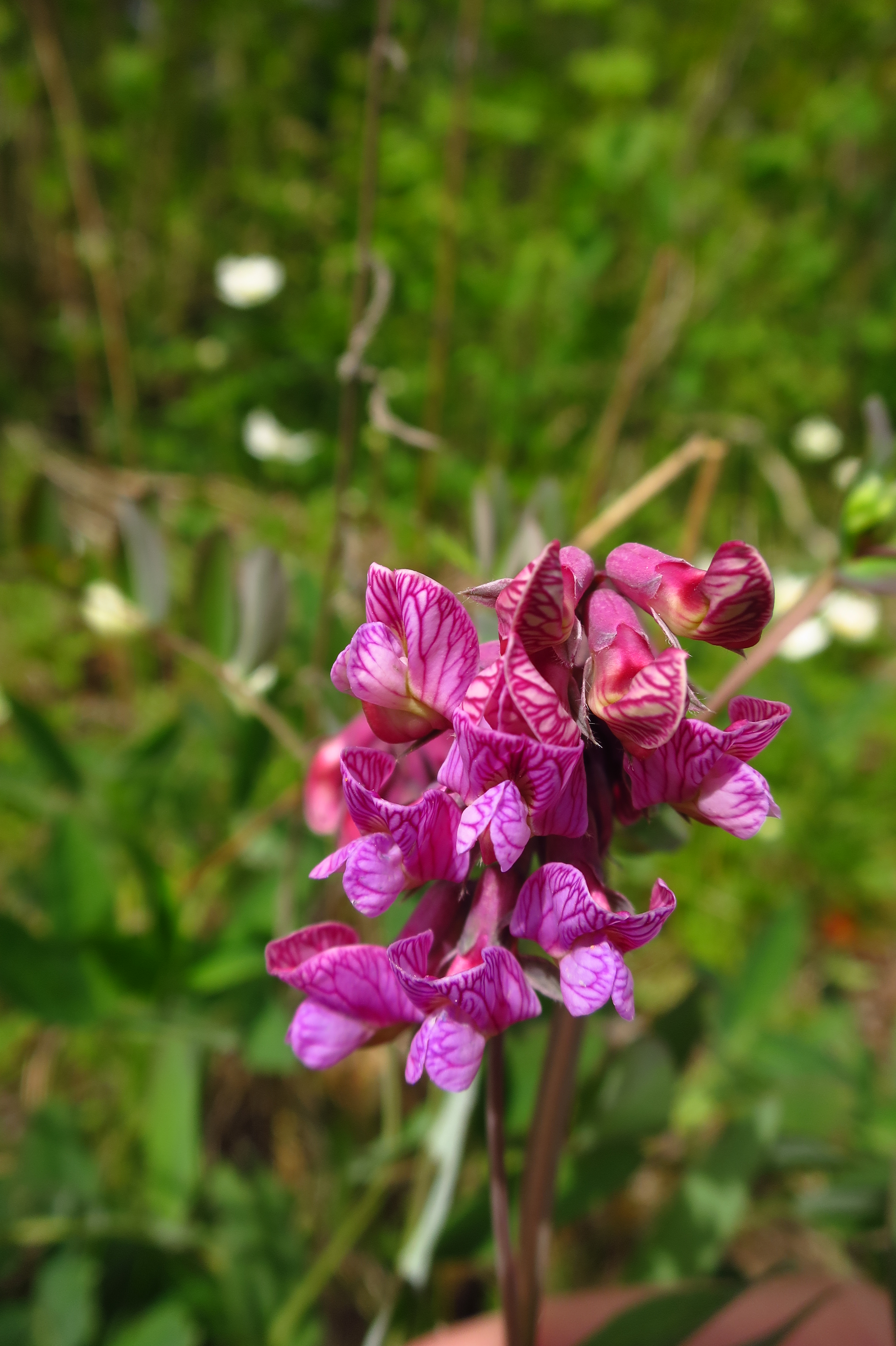

Scientific classification
- Kingdom: Plantae
- Clade: Tracheophytes
- Clade: Angiosperms
- Clade: Eudicots
- Clade: Rosids
- Order: Fabales
- Family: Fabaceae
- Subfamily: Faboideae
- Genus: Lathyrus
- Species: L. pisiformis

Binomial name
- Lathyrus pisiformis L.

= Lathyrus pisiformis =

Species of legume

Lathyrus pisiformis is a species of flowering plant belonging to the family Fabaceae.

Its native range is Central and Eastern Europe to Mongolia and Caucasus.
