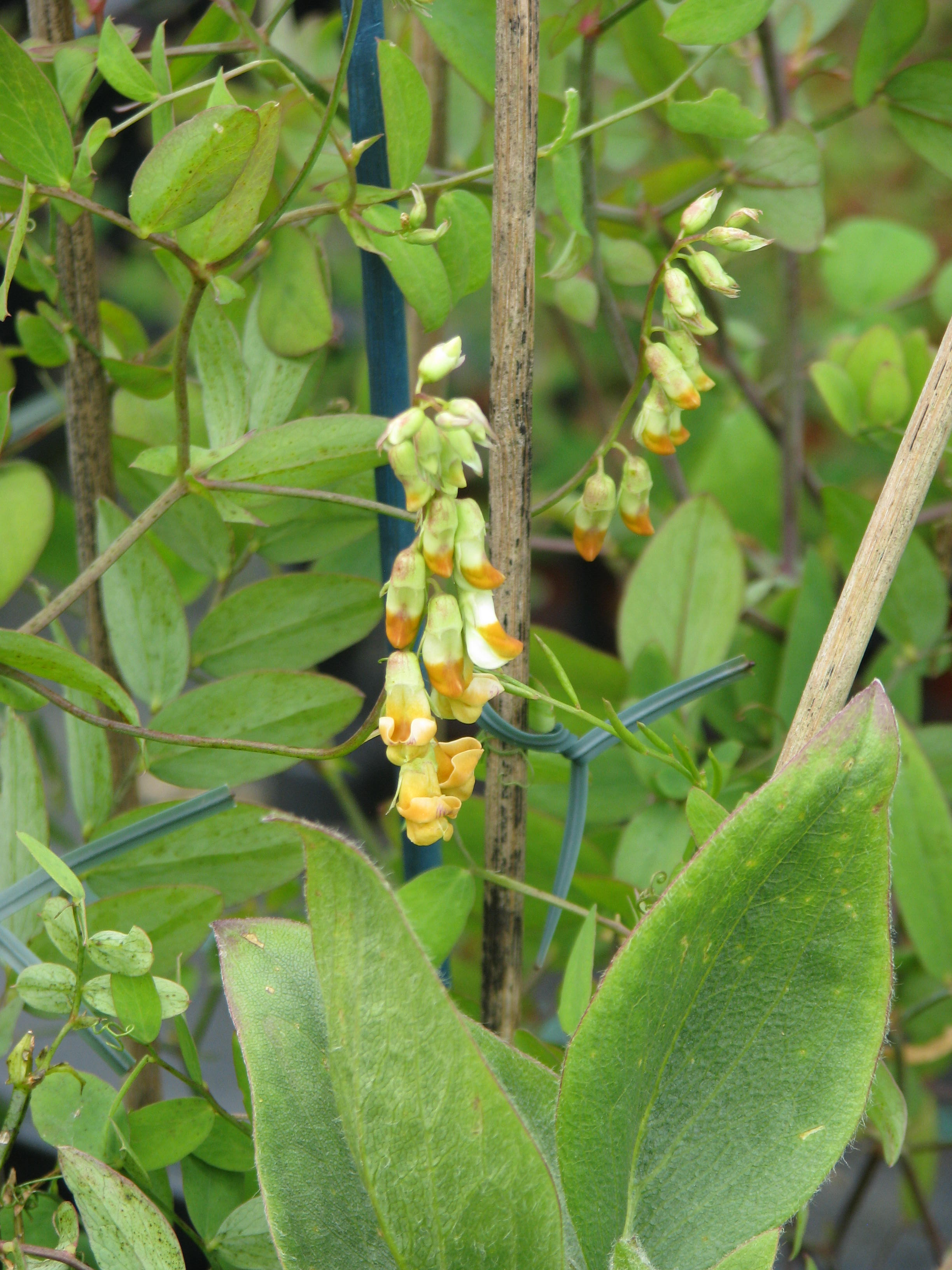

Conservation status
- Secure (NatureServe)

Scientific classification
- Kingdom: Plantae
- Clade: Tracheophytes
- Clade: Angiosperms
- Clade: Eudicots
- Clade: Rosids
- Order: Fabales
- Family: Fabaceae
- Subfamily: Faboideae
- Genus: Lathyrus
- Species: L. sulphureus

Binomial name
- Lathyrus sulphureus W.H.Brewer ex A.Gray

Varieties
- L. s. var. argillaceus Jeps.; L. s. var. sulphureus

= Lathyrus sulphureus =

Plant species in the pea family

Lathyrus sulphureus is a species of wild pea known by the common names snub pea and sulphur pea.

It is native to the mountains of northern California and Oregon, where it grows in forest and woodland.

== Description ==
Lathyrus sulphureus is a hairless perennial herb with leaves made up of many oval-shaped leaflets each up to 4 centimeters long. The leaves are tipped with branching, coiled tendrils and the large stipules may be over 2 centimeters long.

The plant produces a dense inflorescence of up to 15 pea flowers which are often arranged in a line down one side of the stem. The flowers are light yellow to deep orange and darken as they age. They are wide and have deeply folded faces.

The fruit is a hairless dehiscent legume pod.

== Range ==
The redwood pea is native to both California and Oregon in the western US. In California it grows as far south as the Central Valley and the nearby foothills of the Sierra Nevada.
