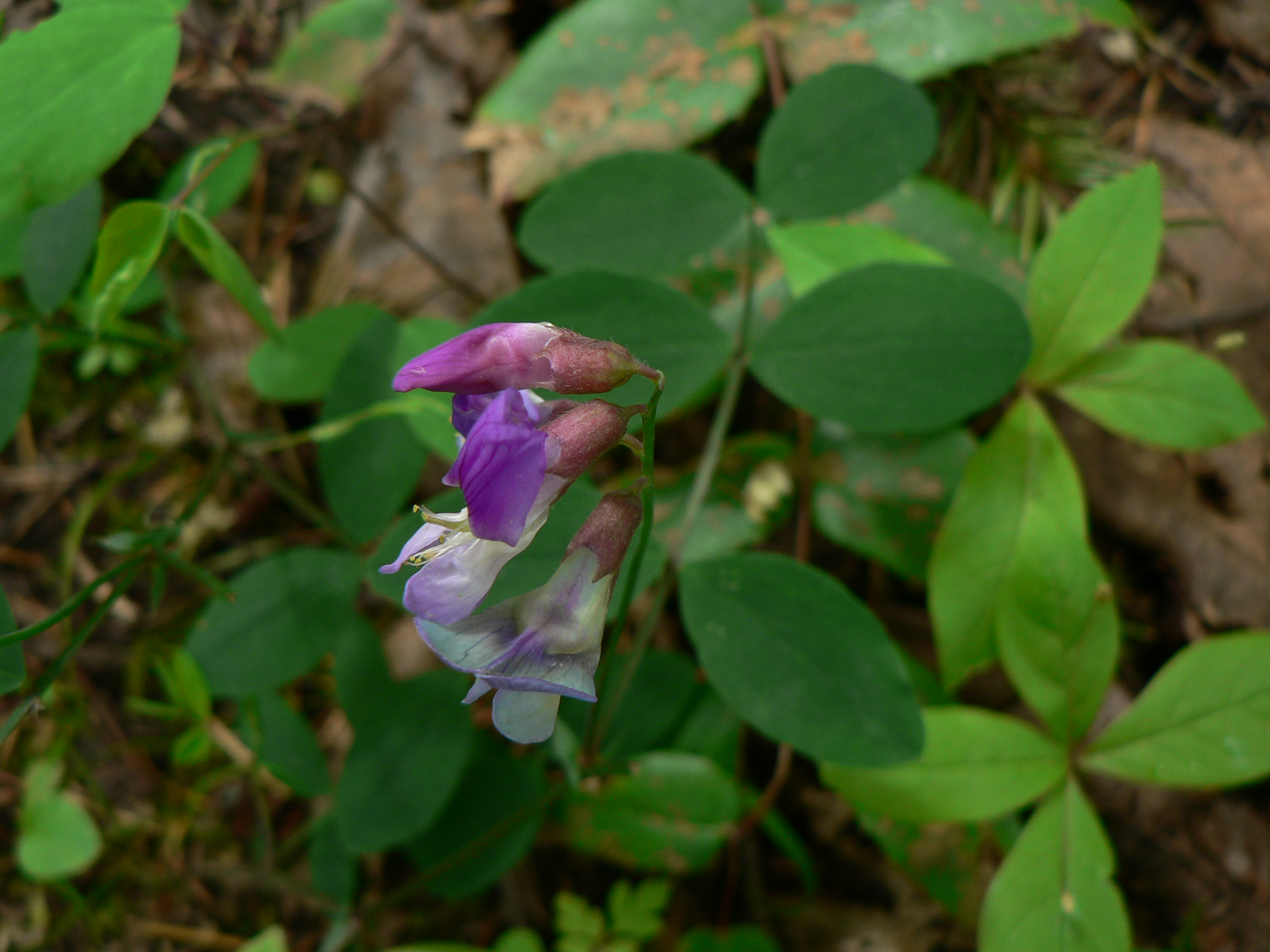
- Flowers

Conservation status
- Secure (NatureServe)

Scientific classification
- Kingdom: Plantae
- Clade: Tracheophytes
- Clade: Angiosperms
- Clade: Eudicots
- Clade: Rosids
- Order: Fabales
- Family: Fabaceae
- Subfamily: Faboideae
- Genus: Lathyrus
- Species: L. nevadensis

Binomial name
- Lathyrus nevadensis S.Watson

Varieties
- L. n. var. cusickii; L. n. var. nevadensis; L. n. var. parkeri

= Lathyrus nevadensis =

Plant species in the pea family

Lathyrus nevadensis, the Sierra pea or purple peavine, is a perennial herb with erect to climbing stems, native to the forests and clearings of western North America from British Columbia to northern California and as far east as Idaho.

== Description ==
The Lathyrus nevadensis plant is a trailer or weak climber vine, supported by tendrils, growing to 1.0 m-3 feet tall. The leaves are pinnate, with 4 to 10 leaflets and a straight, unbranched tendrils at the apex of the petiole. Its flowers are hermaphroditic, pollinated by bees. The plant can also spread vegetatively from creeping rhizomes.

== Taxonomy ==
Lathyrus nevadensis was scientifically described and named by Sereno Watson in 1876. It is classified in the Lathyrus genus within the Fabaceae family. The species Lathyrus parkeri H.St.John, named after Charles S. Parker, was merged into Lathyrus nevadensis as var. parkeri. The species has a total of three accepted varieties.

- Lathyrus nevadensis var. cusickii (S.Watson) Broich – Native to Washington, Oregon, and Idaho
- Lathyrus nevadensis var. nevadensis – Native to from British Columbia to central California
- Lathyrus nevadensis var. parkeri (H.St.John) C.L.Hitchc. – Endemic to Idaho

Lathyrus nevadensis has 16 synonyms of its three varieties.

Table of Synonyms
Name	Year	Rank	Synonym of:	Notes
Lathyrus cusickii S.Watson	1882	species	var. cusickii	≡ hom.
Lathyrus lanceolatus Howell	1898	species	var. nevadensis	= het.
Lathyrus nevadensis subsp. cusickii (S.Watson) C.L.Hitchc.	1952	subspecies	var. cusickii	≡ hom.
Lathyrus nevadensis subsp. lanceolatus (Howell) C.L.Hitchc.	1952	subspecies	var. nevadensis	= het.
Lathyrus nevadensis var. nuttallii (S.Watson) C.L.Hitchc.	1952	variety	var. nevadensis	= het.
Lathyrus nevadensis var. pilosellus (M.Peck) C.L.Hitchc.	1961	variety	var. nevadensis	= het.
Lathyrus nevadensis var. puniceus C.L.Hitchc.	1952	variety	var. nevadensis	= het.
Lathyrus nuttallii S.Watson	1886	species	var. nevadensis	= het.
Lathyrus nuttallii subsp. lanceolatus (Howell) Piper	1918	subspecies	var. nevadensis	= het.
Lathyrus obovatus (Torr.) T.G.White	1894	species	var. nevadensis	= het.
Lathyrus parkeri H.St.John	1937	species	var. parkeri	≡ hom.
Lathyrus pedunculatus H.St.John	1928	species	var. nevadensis	= het.
Lathyrus polymorphus Hook.	1847	species	var. nevadensis	= het., nom. illeg. homonym. post.
Lathyrus rigidus var. pilosellus M.Peck	1928	variety	var. nevadensis	= het.
Lathyrus venosus var. obovatus Torr.	1857	variety	var. nevadensis	= het.
Vicia nana Kellogg	1877	species	var. nevadensis	= het., nom. illeg. homonym. post.
Notes: ≡ homotypic synonym; = heterotypic synonym
