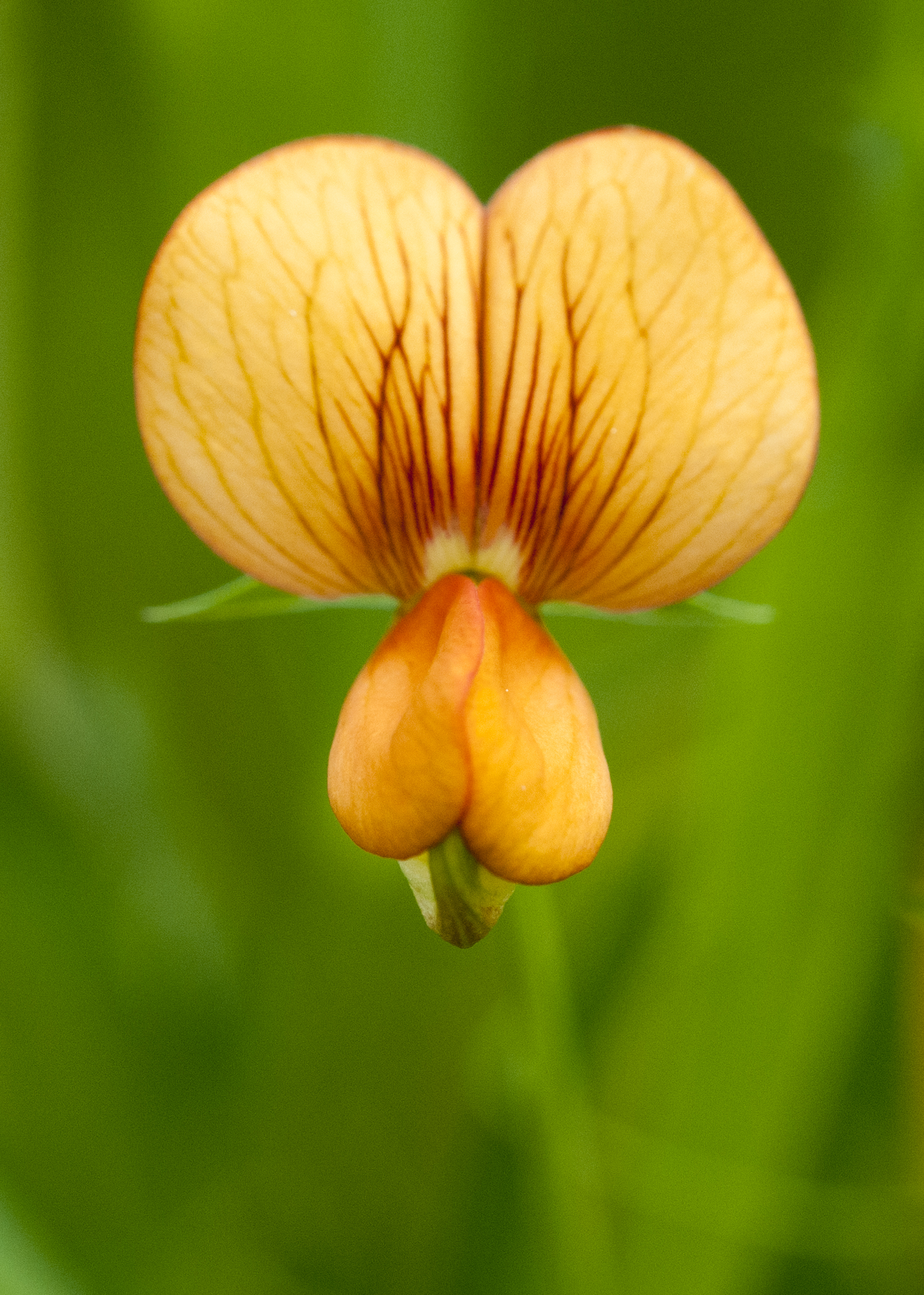

Scientific classification
- Kingdom: Plantae
- Clade: Tracheophytes
- Clade: Angiosperms
- Clade: Eudicots
- Clade: Rosids
- Order: Fabales
- Family: Fabaceae
- Subfamily: Faboideae
- Genus: Lathyrus
- Species: L. annuus

Binomial name
- Lathyrus annuus L.

Synonyms
- Lathyrus chius

= Lathyrus annuus =

Species of flowering plant in the bean family Fabaceae

Lathyrus annuus, the annual vetchling, is a species of annual herb in the family Fabaceae. They are climbers and are associated with freshwater habitat. They have broad leaves. Individuals can grow to 37 cm tall. The species is diploid and has 14 chromosomes (2n=14).

== Sources ==
This article incorporates text from a free content work. Licensed under CC0 (license statement/permission). Text taken from Lathyrus annuus. Encyclopedia of Life.
