= Lathyrus libani =

Scientific classification
- Kingdom: Plantae
- Clade: Tracheophytes
- Clade: Angiosperms
- Clade: Eudicots
- Clade: Rosids
- Order: Fabales
- Family: Fabaceae
- Subfamily: Faboideae
- Genus: Lathyrus
- Species: L. libani

Binomial name
- Lathyrus libani Fritsch

Species of plant

Lathyrus libani, the Lebanon vetchling is a species of wild peas in the legume family, Fabaceae. It grows in mountainous regions of the Eastern Mediterranean at elevations between 750 metres (2,460 ft) to 1,650 metres (5,410 ft).
