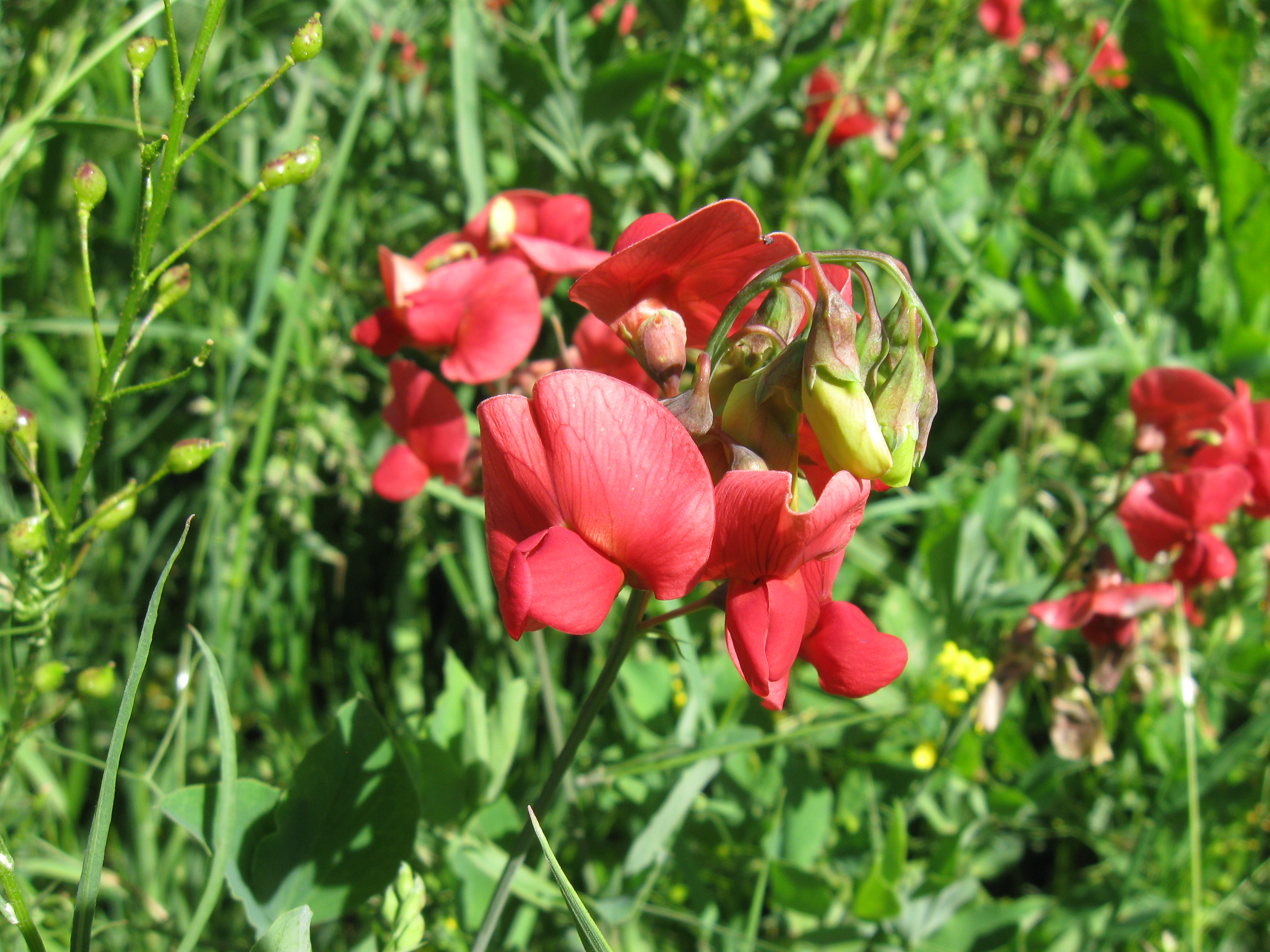

Scientific classification
- Kingdom: Plantae
- Clade: Tracheophytes
- Clade: Angiosperms
- Clade: Eudicots
- Clade: Rosids
- Order: Fabales
- Family: Fabaceae
- Subfamily: Faboideae
- Genus: Lathyrus
- Species: L. rotundifolius

Binomial name
- Lathyrus rotundifolius Willd.

= Lathyrus rotundifolius =

Species of flowering plant

Lathyrus rotundifolius, the Persian everlasting pea, is a species of flowering plant in the pea family Fabaceae, native to Iran. Growing to 1.5 m (4.9 ft) tall, this herbaceous perennial climber has twining, clinging tendrils and brick red flowers in summer. Unlike its relative, the sweet pea (Lathyrus odoratus), the flowers are unscented. It is hardy to −20 °C (−4 °F), but requires a position in full sun.

It holds the Royal Horticultural Society's Award of Garden Merit. It is a suitable subject for scrambling over a fence or through another shrub or tree.
