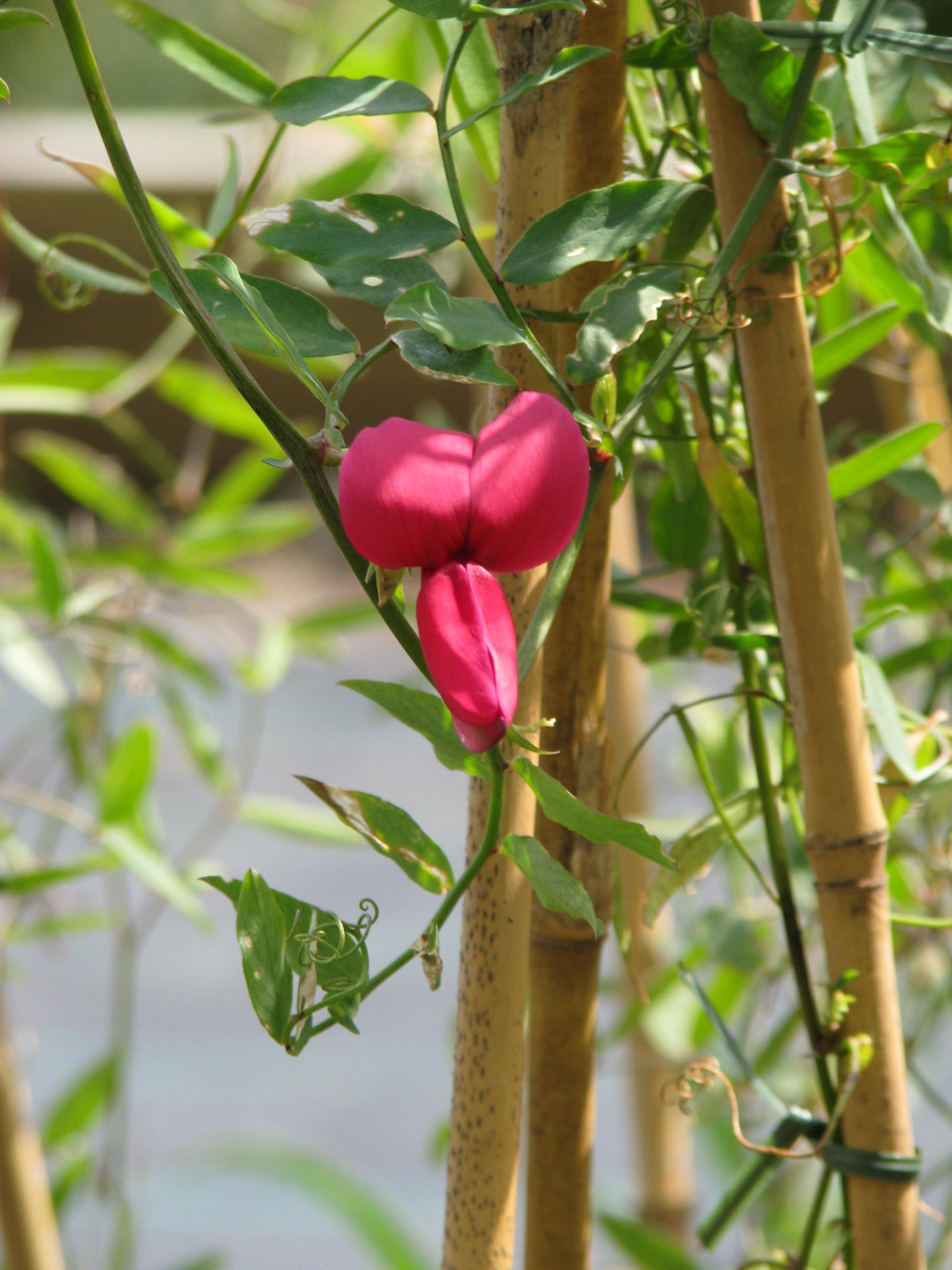

Conservation status
- Vulnerable (NatureServe)

Scientific classification
- Kingdom: Plantae
- Clade: Tracheophytes
- Clade: Angiosperms
- Clade: Eudicots
- Clade: Rosids
- Order: Fabales
- Family: Fabaceae
- Subfamily: Faboideae
- Genus: Lathyrus
- Species: L. splendens

Binomial name
- Lathyrus splendens Kellogg

= Lathyrus splendens =

Plant species in the pea family

Lathyrus splendens is a species of wild pea known by the common names pride of California and Campo pea. It is native to Baja California and its range extends into San Diego County, California, where it grows in the chaparral. This is a climbing perennial pea vine with coiling tendrils. Its leaves are each made up of 6 to 8 linear to oval-shaped leaflets a few centimeters long and wavy-margined stipules. The plant produces showy inflorescences of up to 6 bright to deep red flowers each about 3 centimeters wide. The fruit is a hairless dehiscent legume pod.

== Taxonomy ==
Lathyrus splendens was scientifically described and named by Albert Kellogg in 1877. It is part of the Lathyrus genus within the wider Fabaceae family. The species has no subspecies or botanical synonyms.

== Range ==
The native range of the Campo pea includes the US state of California and the Mexican state of Baja California. However, in California it only grows in San Diego County.
