= Lathyrus gorgoni =

Scientific classification
- Kingdom: Plantae
- Clade: Tracheophytes
- Clade: Angiosperms
- Clade: Eudicots
- Clade: Rosids
- Order: Fabales
- Family: Fabaceae
- Subfamily: Faboideae
- Genus: Lathyrus
- Species: L. gorgoni

Binomial name
- Lathyrus gorgoni Parl.

Synonyms
- Lathyrus amoenus

Species of plant

Lathyrus gorgoni is a species of annual herb in the family Fabaceae. They have a self-supporting growth form and compound, broad leaves. Individuals can grow to 38 cm.

== Sources ==
This article incorporates text from a free content work. Licensed under CC0 (license statement/permission). Text taken from Lathyrus gorgoni. Encyclopedia of Life.
