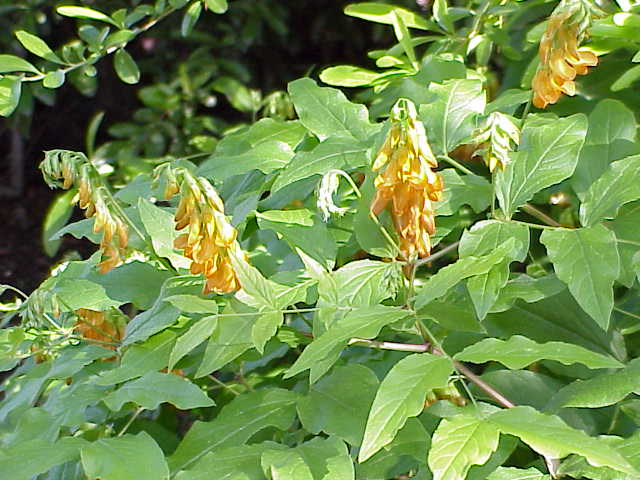

Scientific classification
- Kingdom: Plantae
- Clade: Tracheophytes
- Clade: Angiosperms
- Clade: Eudicots
- Clade: Rosids
- Order: Fabales
- Family: Fabaceae
- Subfamily: Faboideae
- Genus: Lathyrus
- Species: L. aureus

Binomial name
- Lathyrus aureus (Steven) D.Brândză

= Lathyrus aureus =

Species of flowering plant

Lathyrus aureus, the golden pea, is a species of flowering plant in the pea family Fabaceae, native to Greece, Turkey, Armenia, Azerbaijan, Georgia, Russia, Kyrgyzstan, Moldova, Ukraine, Bulgaria, and Romania. In early summer this bushy herbaceous perennial produces many erect spikes of dusky yellow or orange flowers. Each spike is 1.5–2 cm (0.59–0.79 in) long.

Lathyrus aureus is cultivated as an ornamental, for a sunny or partially shaded position in rich neutral or acid soil. As contact may cause mild indigestion, it is best handled with gloves.
