= Lathyrus transsylvanicus =

Scientific classification
- Kingdom: Plantae
- Clade: Tracheophytes
- Clade: Angiosperms
- Clade: Eudicots
- Clade: Rosids
- Order: Fabales
- Family: Fabaceae
- Subfamily: Faboideae
- Genus: Lathyrus
- Species: L. transsylvanicus

Binomial name
- Lathyrus transsylvanicus (Spreng.) Rchb.f.

Synonyms
- Lathyrus laevigatus subsp. transsylvanicus (Spreng.) Breistr. 1940; Lathyrus luteus subsp. transsylvanicus (Spreng.) Dostál 1949; Lathyrus luteus var. transsylvanicus (Spreng.) Beck 1903; Orobus luteus subsp. transsylvanicus (Spreng.) Nyman 1878; Orobus transsylvanicus Spreng. 1826

Species of plant

Lathyrus transsylvanicus is a species of Lathyrus found in Bulgaria, Hungary, Romania, and Ukraine.
