= Lathyrus filiformis =

Scientific classification
- Kingdom: Plantae
- Clade: Tracheophytes
- Clade: Angiosperms
- Clade: Eudicots
- Clade: Rosids
- Order: Fabales
- Family: Fabaceae
- Subfamily: Faboideae
- Genus: Lathyrus
- Species: L. filiformis

Binomial name
- Lathyrus filiformis (Lam.) J.Gay

Synonyms
- Orobus canescens var. filiformis (Lam.) Porta & Rigo 1891; Orobus filiformis Lam. 1779)

Species of plant

Lathyrus filiformis is a species of peavine found in Algeria, France, Italy, Morocco, and Spain.
