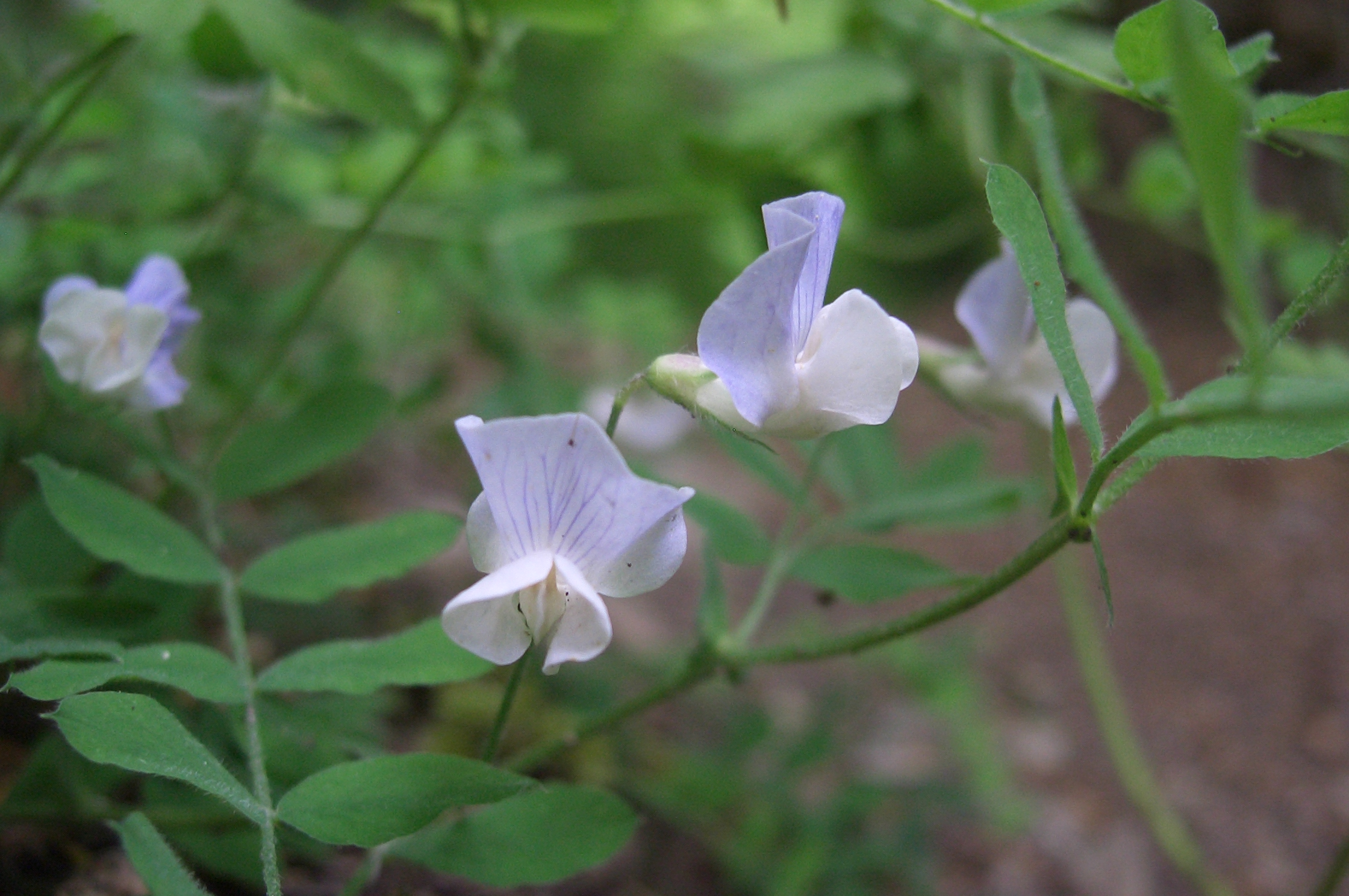

Conservation status
- Secure (NatureServe)

Scientific classification
- Kingdom: Plantae
- Clade: Tracheophytes
- Clade: Angiosperms
- Clade: Eudicots
- Clade: Rosids
- Order: Fabales
- Family: Fabaceae
- Subfamily: Faboideae
- Genus: Lathyrus
- Species: L. torreyi

Binomial name
- Lathyrus torreyi A.Gray

Synonyms
- Lathyrus torreyi var. tenellus Wiegand; Orobus villosus Torr.

= Lathyrus torreyi =

Plant species in the pea family

Lathyrus torreyi, also known as Torrey's peavine and redwood pea, is a perennial legume native to wooded regions of the West Coast of the United States. It ranges from as far north as Pierce County, Washington and south to Monterey, California. It sprouts bluish flowers that range from 8 to 13 millimeters in length.

== Taxonomy ==
In 1868 Asa Gray scientifically described a new species in the Lathyrus genus, which he named Lathyrus torreyi. Along with the rest of its genus it is classified in the Fabaceae family. The species has no accepted varieties, but one was described in 1899 by Karl McKay Wiegand which he named Lathyrus torreyi var. tenellus. In addition name Orobus villosus published by John Torrey in 1874 is also considered a heterotypic synonym.

== Range ==
Redwood peas are native from Washington to California in western North America. In California they grow as far south as Monterey.

== Sources ==
- Beidleman, Linda H.; Kozloff, Eugene N. (2003). Plants of the San Francisco Bay Region: Mendocino to Monterey, University of California Press, ISBN 0-520-23172-4.
