= Lathyrus roseus =

Scientific classification
- Kingdom: Plantae
- Clade: Tracheophytes
- Clade: Angiosperms
- Clade: Eudicots
- Clade: Rosids
- Order: Fabales
- Family: Fabaceae
- Subfamily: Faboideae
- Genus: Lathyrus
- Species: L. roseus

Binomial name
- Lathyrus roseus Steven

Synonyms
- Orobus roseus (Steven) Ledeb. 1843

Species of plant

Lathyrus roseus is a species of Lathyrus found in Turkey, Syria, and Iran.
