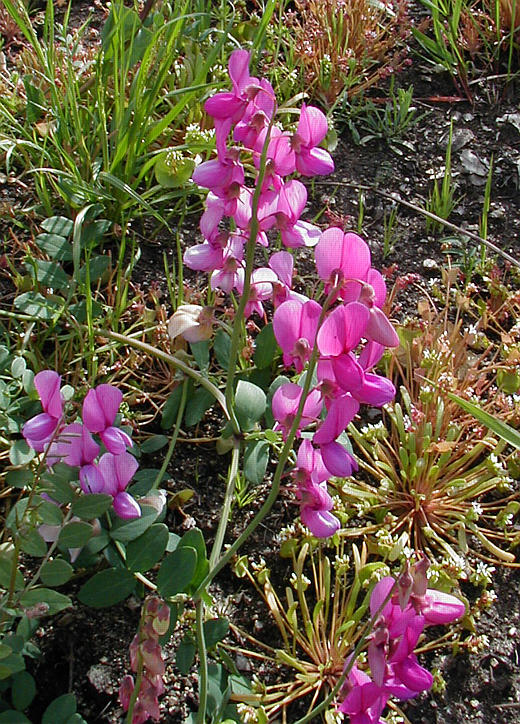

Conservation status
- Secure (NatureServe)

Scientific classification
- Kingdom: Plantae
- Clade: Tracheophytes
- Clade: Angiosperms
- Clade: Eudicots
- Clade: Rosids
- Order: Fabales
- Family: Fabaceae
- Subfamily: Faboideae
- Genus: Lathyrus
- Species: L. vestitus

Binomial name
- Lathyrus vestitus Nutt.

Synonyms
- List: Lathyrus alefeldii T.G.White; Lathyrus bolanderi S.Watson; Lathyrus bolanderi var. barbarae (T.G.White) Jeps.; Lathyrus bolanderi subsp. quercetorum (A.Heller) Bradshaw; Lathyrus bolanderi var. quercetorum (A.Heller) Jeps.; Lathyrus bolanderi subsp. violaceus (Greene) Bradshaw; Lathyrus bolanderi var. violaceus (Greene) Jeps.; Lathyrus laetiflorus Greene; Lathyrus laetiflorus subsp. alefeldii (T.G.White) Bradshaw; Lathyrus laetiflorus var. alefeldii (T.G.White) Jeps.; Lathyrus laetiflorus subsp. barbarae (T.G.White) C.L.Hitchc.; Lathyrus laetiflorus subsp. glaber C.L.Hitchc.; Lathyrus maritimus Torr.; Lathyrus ochropetalus Piper; Lathyrus peckii Piper; Lathyrus polyphyllus var. insecundus Jeps.; Lathyrus puberulus T.G.White ex Greene; Lathyrus quercetorum A.Heller; Lathyrus strictus Nutt.; Lathyrus strictus var. alfeldii (T.G.White) Jeps.; Lathyrus strictus var. barbarae (T.G.White) Jeps.; Lathyrus strictus var. thacherae Jeps.; Lathyrus venosus var. grandiflorus Torr.; Lathyrus vestitus subsp. alefeldii (T.G.White) Broich; Lathyrus vestitus subsp. bolanderi (S.Watson) C.L.Hitchc.; Lathyrus vestitus subsp. laetiflorus (Greene) Broich; Lathyrus vestitus subsp. laevicarpus Broich; Lathyrus vestitus var. multiflorus Torr.; Lathyrus vestitus subsp. ochropetalus (Piper) C.L.Hitchc.; Lathyrus vestitus subsp. puberulus (T.G.White ex Greene) C.L.Hitchc.; Lathyrus vestitus var. puberulus Jeps.; Lathyrus vestitus subsp. violaceus (Greene) Abrams; Lathyrus violaceus Greene; Lathyrus violaceus var. barbarae T.G.White; Orobus californicus Alef.; Orobus vestitus (Nutt.) Alef.

= Lathyrus vestitus =

Plant species in the pea family

Lathyrus vestitus is a species of wild pea known by the common name Pacific pea. It is native to western North America, where it is mostly found in the forests, woodlands, and chaparral of California. The ranges of some subspecies extend into Oregon and Baja California. This is a perennial pea vine which varies in appearance across subspecies. Leaves are made up of several leaflets of various shapes up to 4 or 5 centimeters long. The leaves usually bear coiling tendrils and the stipules may be large or small. The inflorescence is a showy array of up to 15 pea flowers, sometimes densely packed together, and usually some shade of bright violet, light to medium purple, or white.

== Taxonomy ==
Lathyrus vestitus was scientifically described and named in 1838 by Thomas Nuttall. In 1861 Friedrich Alefeld proposed moving it to Orobus, but this genus is not accepted. The species continues to be classified in Lathyrus as part of the Fabaceae family. It has three accepted varieties according to Plants of the World Online.

- Lathyrus vestitus var. alefeldii
- Lathyrus vestitus var. ochropetalus
- Lathyrus vestitus var. vestitus

Lathyrus vestitus has 36 synonyms of the species or one of its three varieties including 12 species names.

Table of Synonyms
Name	Year	Rank	Synonym of:	Notes
Lathyrus alefeldii T.G.White	1894	species	var. alefeldii	≡ hom.
Lathyrus bolanderi S.Watson	1885	species	var. vestitus	= het.
Lathyrus laetiflorus Greene	1893	species	var. vestitus	= het.
Lathyrus maritimus Torr.	1859	species	var. vestitus	= het., nom. illeg. homonym. post.
Lathyrus ochropetalus Piper	1918	species	var. ochropetalus	≡ hom.
Lathyrus peckii Piper	1918	species	var. ochropetalus	= het.
Lathyrus puberulus T.G.White ex Greene	1894	species	var. vestitus	= het.
Lathyrus quercetorum A.Heller	1907	species	var. vestitus	= het.
Lathyrus strictus Nutt.	1838	species	var. alefeldii	= het., nom. illeg. homonym. post.
Lathyrus violaceus Greene	1893	species	var. vestitus	= het.
Orobus californicus Alef.	1861	species	var. alefeldii	≡ hom.
Orobus vestitus (Nutt.) Alef.	1861	species	L. vestitus	≡ hom.
Notes: ≡ homotypic synonym ; = heterotypic synonym

== Range ==
The Pacific pea is native to Oregon and California in the United States and to Baja California in the far northwest of Mexico. They are also part of the native flora of the Channel Islands.
