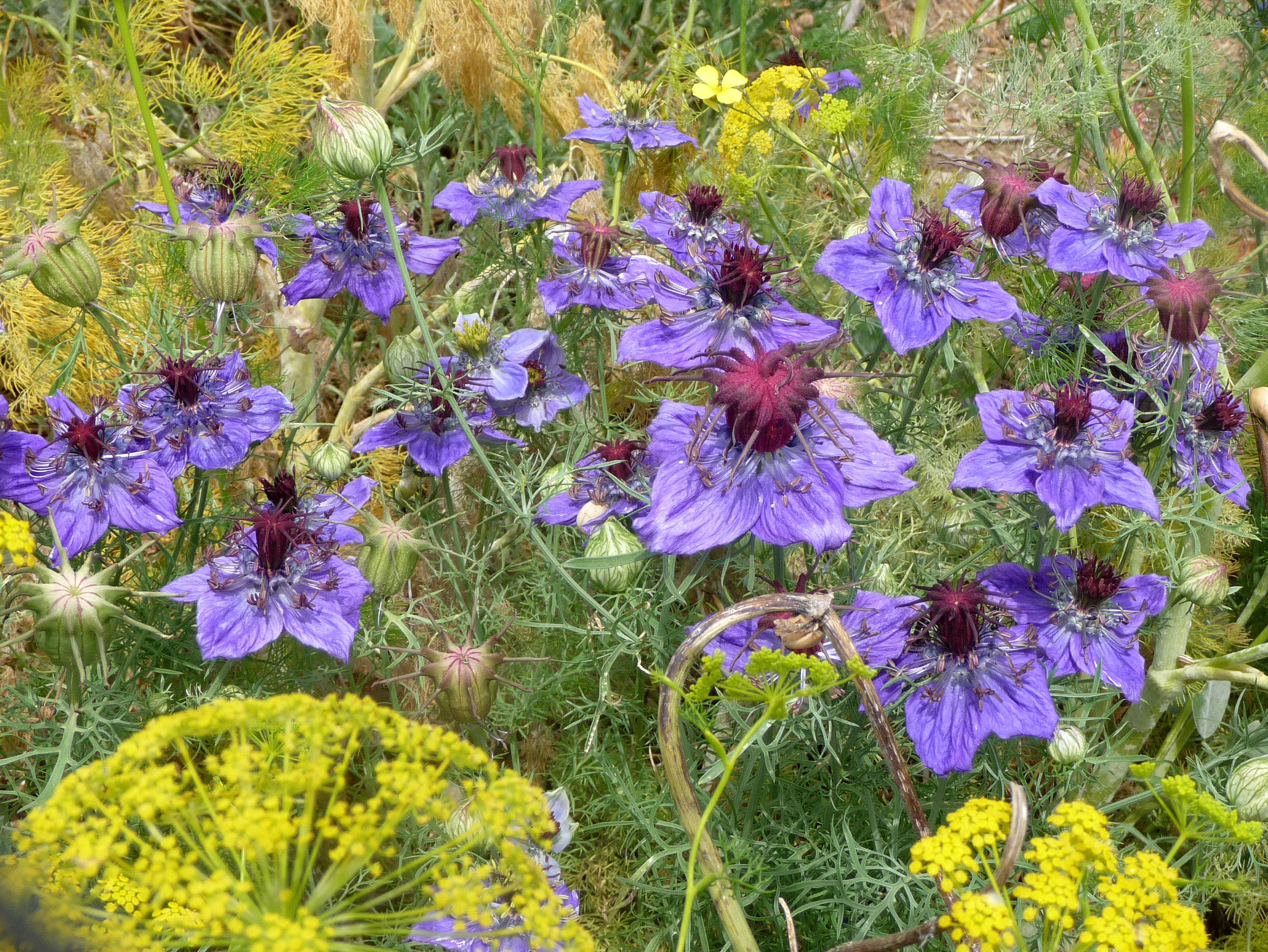
- Flowers
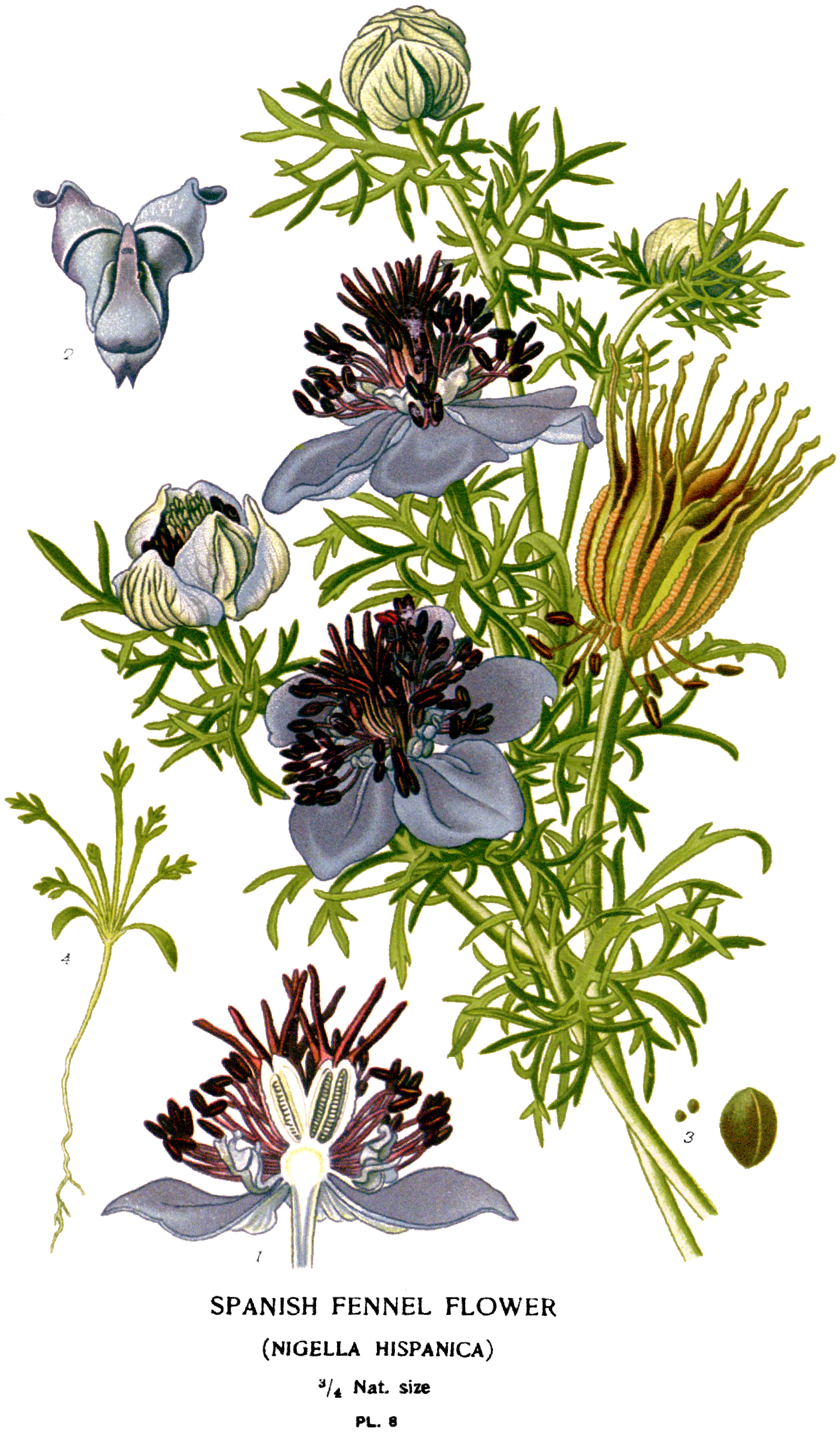
- Botanical illustration

Scientific classification
- Kingdom: Plantae
- Clade: Tracheophytes
- Clade: Angiosperms
- Clade: Eudicots
- Order: Ranunculales
- Family: Ranunculaceae
- Genus: Nigella
- Species: N. hispanica

Binomial name
- Nigella hispanica L.

Synonyms
- Nigella amoena Salisb.; Nigella atropurpurea C.Huber; Nigella gaditana Soleirol ex Nyman; Nigella intermedia Rouy & Foucaud; Nigella polygynia Moench

= Nigella hispanica =

Species of flowering plant

Nigella hispanica, the Spanish fennel flower, is a partially recognized species of flowering plant in the genus Nigella in the family Ranunculaceae, native to Portugal, Spain, and France. An annual or biennial with bushy foliage that can reach 60 cm (2.0 ft) tall, the species blooms in the summer with blue flowers. Sometimes considered part of the species Nigella gallica, studies have determined that N. hispanica extracts can function as an anti-inflammatory and that essential oils from the species are chemically distinct from oils extracted from other members of the genus.

== Description ==
Nigella hispanica is a flowering plant in the genus Nigella in the family Ranunculaceae. The plants have lifespans of one to two years and the species can be described as an annual or biennial plant. All taxa of the tribe Nigelleae – consisting of the genera Nigella, Garidella, and Komaroffia – share annual lifespans, showy sepals, small petals, and capsule fruit.

N. hispanica plants produce upright, bushy foliage that emerges in the spring. The foliage can reach 60 cm (24 in) tall and 50 cm (20 in) wide. The leaves are finely dissected. In the summer, the plants bloom with blue flowers. These flowers comprise five petaloid sepals. The centers of the flowers, containing the stamens and immature fruit, are red. Fruiting also occurs in the summer. The swollen pale-green fruit are flushed with dark red.

=== Phytochemistry ===
Nigella hispanica seeds, like the seeds of other members of the genus, are sometimes consumed by humans as a spice. A 2009-published in the Journal of Medicinal Food found that chloroform extract from N. hispanica seeds exhibited anti-inflammatory properties by functioning as a cyclooxygenase-2 inhibitor (coxib). Extracts from Nigella arvensis and Nigella orientalis seeds also functioned as coxibs but, unlike N. hispanica, also exhibited antimicrobial activity.

A 2012-published study in the journal Chemistry & Biodiversity examined the hydrodistilled essential oils from N. hispanica. The composition of oils extracted from N. hispanica were primarily fatty acids. Similar extraction methods in other Nigella species produced substantially different products, with primarily mono- and sesquiterpenes. The study concluded that this indicates N. hispanica occupies "a unique chemotaxonomical position" within its genus.

== Taxonomy ==
The binomial Nigella hispanica was assigned by the Swedish biologist Carl Linnaeus in his 1753 book Species Plantarum.

The Flora Iberica treats N. hispanica as a synonym for Nigella gallica, as did a 2021 taxonomic assessment of the entire tribe Nigelleae published in the Turkish Journal of Botany. N. hispanica is accepted as a species by the Royal Botanic Gardens, Kew's Plants of the World Online and the United States Fish and Wildlife Service.

== Distribution ==
Nigella hispanica has a native range that spans southwestern Europe, including France, Portugal, and Spain. An introduced population is also found in Great Britain. The species favors the subtropics.

== Cultivation ==
Nigella hispanica is grown as an ornamental plant. The Royal Horticultural Society (RHS) assesses favorable conditions for the species as hardiness zone H3 indicating preference for "coastal and relatively mild parts" of the United Kingdom where minimum temperatures are between −5 °C (23 °F) to 1 °C (34 °F). The RHS indicates that the species succeeds in well-drained chalky, sandy, or loamy soil in full sun, regardless of whether it is sheltered or exposed. The RHS also considers the species beneficial for pollinators and recognizes the seed capsules for their ornamental value. The species does not typically face problems from pests or diseases.
