= Nigella foeniculacea =

Nigella foeniculacea can refer to:

- Nigella foeniculacea DC., a synonym of Nigella arvensis L. subsp. arvensis
- Nigella foeniculacea Hohen. ex Boiss., a synonym of Nigella segetalis M.Bieb.
