= IndExs – Index of Exsiccatae =

Online biological database

- Website type: Database
- Available in: English
- Creator: SNSB – Botanische Staatssammlung München
- Website: indexs.botanischestaatssammlung.de
- Commercial: No
- Registration: Not required
- Launched: 2001; 25 years ago
- Current status: Active

IndExs – Index of Exsiccatae is an online biological database that plays a pivotal role in documenting more than 2,600 historical and ongoing series of exsiccatae and exsiccata-like works. Managed by the Botanische Staatssammlung München in München, IndExs serves as a comprehensive data repository and authority control database for these series. It is listed in the Registry of Research Data Repositories. The controlled vocabulary contains bibliographic details, series titles and standard abbreviations, publication periods, information on the sequential numbering of specimens, on predecessor and successor series and publishers, as well as detailed information on the more than 1,300 editors. Exsiccatae, organised series of biological specimens distributed among biological collections, are essential resources found in major herbaria worldwide. Open access to the general information on exsiccatae facilitates global scientific engagement and research. The database tells surprising stories of the common cultural history of taxonomic collections worldwide as well as the persons and organisations involved in plant specimen exchange and trade projects.

== History and purpose ==
Launched in 2001, IndExs has become indispensable to herbaria, fungaria, and digitisation initiatives, catering to their evolving scientific content needs. The database categorises exsiccatae (including exsiccata-like series) and the specimens they distribute, focusing on major organismic groups within botany and mycology. This categorisation is enhanced by images of exemplary specimen labels from more than 140 herbaria citing their Index Herbariorum´s acronyms. IndExs standardizes the naming conventions for exsiccata series.

IndExs leverages the DiversityExsiccatae module of the Diversity Workbench framework as a database management system. Recently, efforts of the biodiversity informatics department of the Bavarian State Collections of Natural History to align its technical infrastructure with Wikidata concepts have begun, indicating a move towards more integrated and semantic web-based data management practices. The main focus is on the disambiguation of names of more than 1,300 editors and the integration of information for 2,600 exsiccata series into the semantic web. This move involves adopting Wikidata identifiers for the precise identification of editors, contributing additional details to existing Wikidata entries about their scientific work, and creating new entries where necessary. A proposed new property, the "IndExs Exsiccata ID," aims to link directly to IndExs, allowing for the incorporation of exsiccata series information into Wikidata. This integration facilitates a linked data environment, ensuring that the significant contributions of botanical and mycological editors and their work are more accessible and accurately represented in global data repositories.

== Applications ==
The practical application of IndExs is highlighted by its use in the cataloguing and analysis of the bryophyte collection at the National Herbarium in Pretoria (PRE), South Africa. In this project, IndExs was used as controlled vocabulary to compile the first catalogue of exsiccatae for the PRE collection and provided the necessary framework and reference material to identify and classify the 66 exsiccatae series represented in the collection. Through IndExs, the project team was able to identify and document significant exsiccatae within the PRE collection, including rare sets like Anton Rehmann's Musci Austro-Africani and Bryophyta Antarctica exsiccata edited by Ryszard Ochyra. This case shows how IndExs facilitates the documentation and study of botanical specimens, enabling the first comprehensive catalog of exsiccatae within a major herbarium collection. IndExs with its standardised titles is used in a similar way to create the dataset Bound Volumes and Exsiccatae in the Botanical Collections at the Natural History Museum, London. Through IndExs, researchers can access information on exsiccatae, contributing to botanical research, taxonomy, and the history of botanical exploration and exchange. Similarly, the IndExs has been proposed for use as a reference list in the digitisation of German herbaria specimens and related biodiversity informatics projects. IndExs example images of exsiccata labels with reference to Index Herbariorum acronym, exsiccatal serial number and published taxon name give a first hint in which herbaria the series in question can be found today. IndExs is acknowledged as useful resource to explain abbreviations and references as found on handwritten and printed herbarium labels (schedae) and is cited as information resource in reviews on historical herbaria and plant collectors like Ignaz Dörfler. Since 2026, IndExs exsiccata labels are applied to construct the collector's profile in the WordPress open source framework herbUA Collectors.
