= Exsiccata =

Published sets of preserved botanical specimens distributed with printed labels

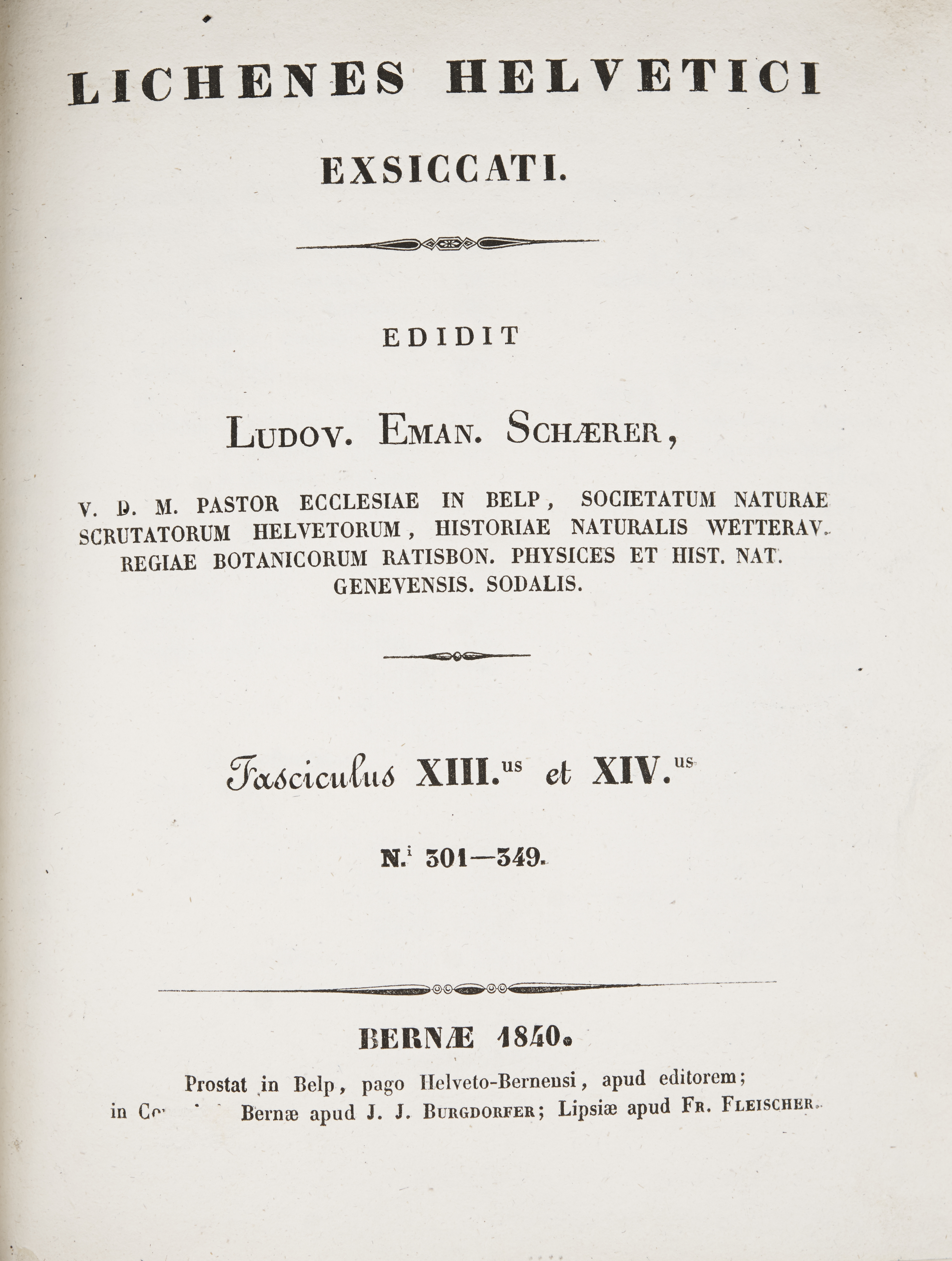
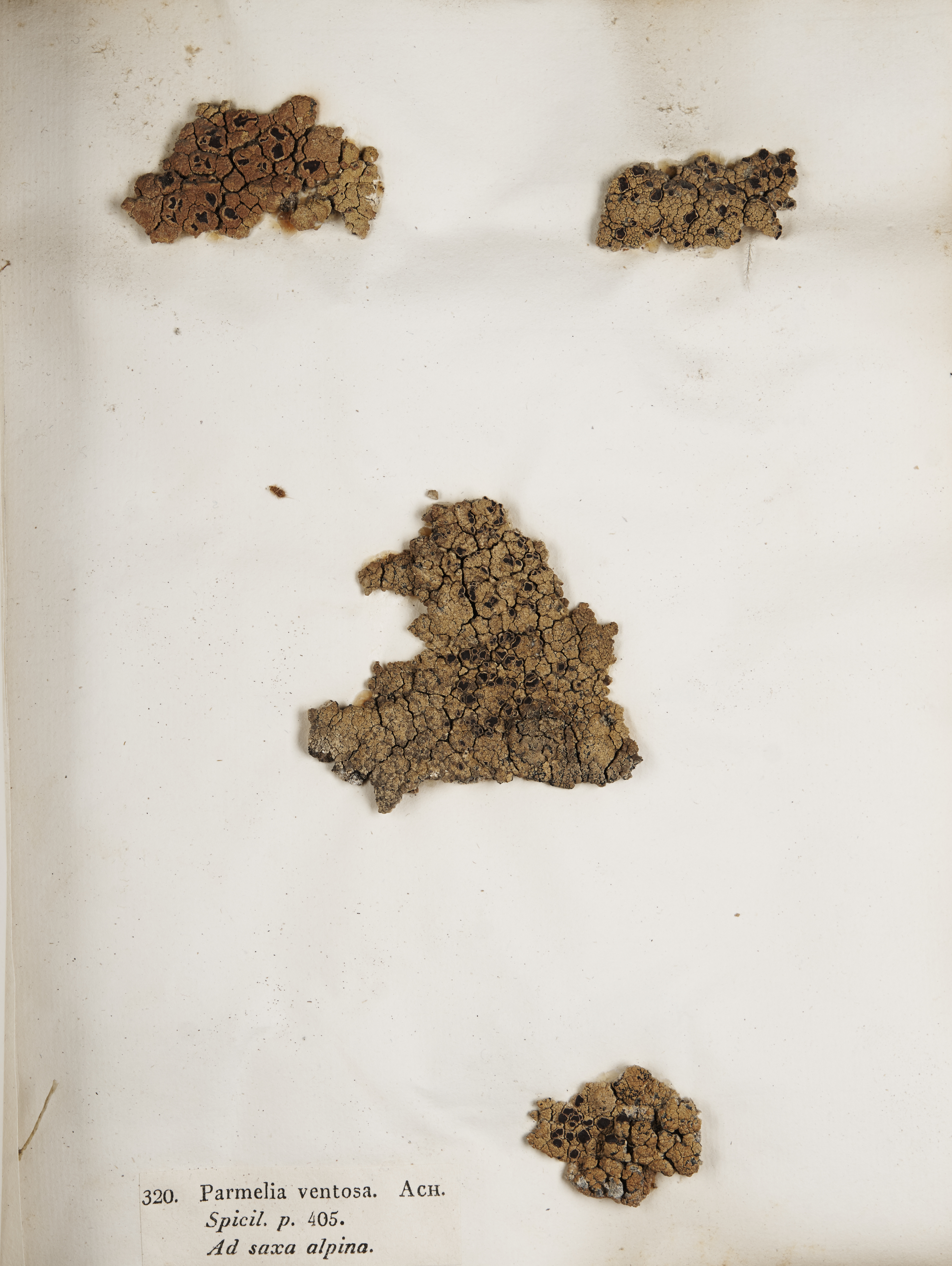
Front cover and dried herbarium specimen no. 320, now known as Ophioparma ventosa, from Ludwig Schaerer's exsiccata series Lichenes Helvetici (Swiss lichens), published in 26 fascicles from 1823 to 1852; the imaged exsiccata item (copy) is from the Herbarium of the Université de Neuchâtel, Switzerland (NEU)

Exsiccata (from Latin; gen. and pl. exsiccatae) is a work consisting of "published, uniform, numbered set[s] of preserved specimens distributed with printed labels". Typically, exsiccatae are consecutively numbered collections of dried herbarium specimens or preserved biological samples issued in several duplicate sets under a common theme or title, such as Lichenes Helvetici exsiccati. Exsiccatae are regarded as scientific contributions by their editors, combining features of the library world (published booklets of scientific literature with authors or editors and titles, often issued as serial publications or in fascicles) with features of the herbarium world (uniform, numbered collections of duplicate herbarium specimens). Exsiccatae represent a distinct form of scholarly communication. The accompanying printed matter or published booklets consist mainly of lists of labels (schedae) giving information on each numbered unit in the series. Broader uses of the concept also occur.

Several comprehensive bibliographies and studies of exsiccatae have been published for algae, bryophytes and lichens, lichens and fungi. No printed bibliography devoted to works on vascular plants is available. The online database IndExs – Index of Exsiccatae fills this gap.

== Early history ==
Exsiccatae are also referred to as exsiccatal series, exsiccata(e) series, exsiccata(e) works, and exsiccatae collections; more rarely, the terms exsiccati and exsiccate are also used. The feminine noun "exsiccata" (Latin, gen. -ae, plur. -ae), used for an exsiccata series, is often not clearly distinguished from the neuter noun "exsiccatum" (Latin, gen. -i, plur. -a), the general term for a dried herbarium specimen. The Latin adjective "exsiccatus, -a, -um", meaning "dried", is also used in mushroom diagnoses such as specimina exsiccata and frequently appears in Latin titles of exsiccatae, for example Lichenes exsiccati.

The oldest known series regarded as an exsiccata is that of the German naturalist and pharmacist Johann Balthasar Ehrhart, titled Herbarium vivum recens collectum... It was distributed in 1732. Its plant material and accompanying text were intended for the education of physicians, pharmacists and teachers. With this aim, exsiccatae developed out of illustrated herbarium books such as the Herbaria viva distributed in the 16th and 17th centuries, but replaced images with dried and pressed plant material. Series with a scholarly and scientific focus followed a few years later. One such series was published by the Swiss botanist Jakob Friedrich Ehrhart, a pupil of Carl Linnaeus, under the title Plantae cryptogamae Linn., quas in locis earum natalibus collegit et exsiccavit Fridericus Ehrhart. The first fascicle was issued in 1785. Ehrhart was among the first to promote the sale of dried plants through several series, including Arbores, frutices et suffrutices Linnaei quas in usum dendrophilorum collegit et exsiccavit Fr. Ehrhart and Calamariae, Gramina et Tripetaloideae Linnaei, quas in usum botanicophilorum collegit et exsiccavit Fr. Ehrhart. The German pharmacist and botanist David Heinrich Hoppe started five years later to edit and distribute – finally twelve – exsiccatae, partly referring in the title to the Regensburg Botanical Society which he founded in 1790. An example is the series Herbarium vivum plantarum rariorum praesertim alpinarum exhibens plantas a Societatis botanici Ratisbonensis sodalibus in variis Germaniae regionibus collectas et Botanophilis communicatas. Edward Hobson was an English weaver and bryophyte collector who published an exsiccata work in two bound volumes under the title A collection of specimens of British mosses and Hepaticae, collected in the vicinity of Manchester, and systematically arranged with reference to the Muscologia Britanica, English Botany, &c, &c, &c, by Edward Hobson. [Musci Britannici] (1818–1822). It was offered for sale and had considerable influence among botanists and in scholarly circles of the time.

Most of the 2,600 known exsiccatae and exsiccata-like specimen series appeared in the 19th century. They were often devoted to a single group of organisms or a particular geographical region. Two examples are as follows: Alexander Braun, Gottlob Ludwig Rabenhorst and Ernst Stizenberger distributed Die Characeen Europa's in getrockneten Exemplaren, unter Mitwirkung mehrerer Freunde der Botanik, gesammelt und herausgegeben von Prof. A. Braun, L. Rabenhorst und E. Stizenberger in 1878 and Thomas Drummond published Musci Americani; or, specimens of the mosses collected in British North America, and chiefly among the Rocky Mountains, during the Second Land Arctic Expedition under the command of Captain Franklin, R.N. by Thomas Drummond, Assistant Naturalist ... in 1828.

Some series are devoted to organisms of economic or medicinal relevance, and are thus of interest to pharmacists, plant pathologists, veterinarians, and those working in horticulture, agriculture and forestry. Felix von Thümen published several exsiccatal series of this kind, including Herbarium mycologicum oeconomicum.

== Relevance in science ==
Exsiccatae are well-established reference resources in collection-based life science and biodiversity research. Especially in early, large and widely distributed series such as the Fungi Rhenani of Karl Wilhelm Gottlieb Leopold Fuckel, many taxonomic type specimens occur among the 2,700 numbered specimen units and are now labelled as isotypes or lectotypes. As part of well-documented (historical) collections of dried specimens, and deposited as duplicate vouchers in recognised herbaria worldwide, exsiccata items are ideal subjects for use in current biological and biodiversity research studies. They might be explicitly cited in academic papers on the phylogeny and evolution of species groups, an example being the publication on the genus Blumeria (2021).

In 2001, a web portal and underlying database called IndExs – Index of Exsiccatae was launched to gather and provide bibliographic information on all types of exsiccatae and exsiccata-like series. Currently more than 2,600 series with more than 1,300 editors are known. The editors are often well-known taxonomists. When they published exsiccatae, those series were explicitly cited in Frans Stafleu and Richard Sumner Cowan's standard work Taxonomic Literature: A Selective Guide to Botanical Publications and Collections, with Dates, Commentaries, and Types (7 volumes) and in the 8-volume supplement series, the first 6 volumes of which were co-authored by Erik Albert Mennega. How many issues (= sets) of an exsiccata were published and distributed is often unknown. In large institutional herbaria (see List of herbaria), exsiccatae are often no longer kept in their original sets; instead, each numbered specimen unit is incorporated into the general collections and filed under the current taxon name, for example in M and HUH (FH).

=== ICBN/ICN nomenclature code and effective publication of names ===
From the 19th century to the late-20th century, exsiccatae played an important role in binomial nomenclature and taxonomic revisions. Many taxa were newly described in exsiccatae or exsiccata-like specimen series with type specimens distributed as iso- and lectotypes. The printed labels and schedae booklets are serving for the effective publication of the names; one example is Iris camillae, described by Alexander Alfonsovich Grossheim in the schedae of Plantae orientales exsiccatae. These printed materials are often classed as grey literature. From 1953 onward, under the Stockholm Code edition of the International Code of Nomenclature for algae fungi and plants, the printed materials accompanying exsiccatae and exsiccata-like series had to be distributed independently of the exsiccatae for effective publication (see, e.g., Vienna Code 2006, Article 30.4). The Shenzhen Code, 2018 and Madrid Code, 2025 mention exsiccatae only briefly, but gives two exsiccatae as examples of effective publication under Article 30.8, Note 2. This reflects the relatively minor role of newly started exsiccatae, with only around 55 series currently published and material sent out to herbaria.

=== Herbarium digitization initiatives ===
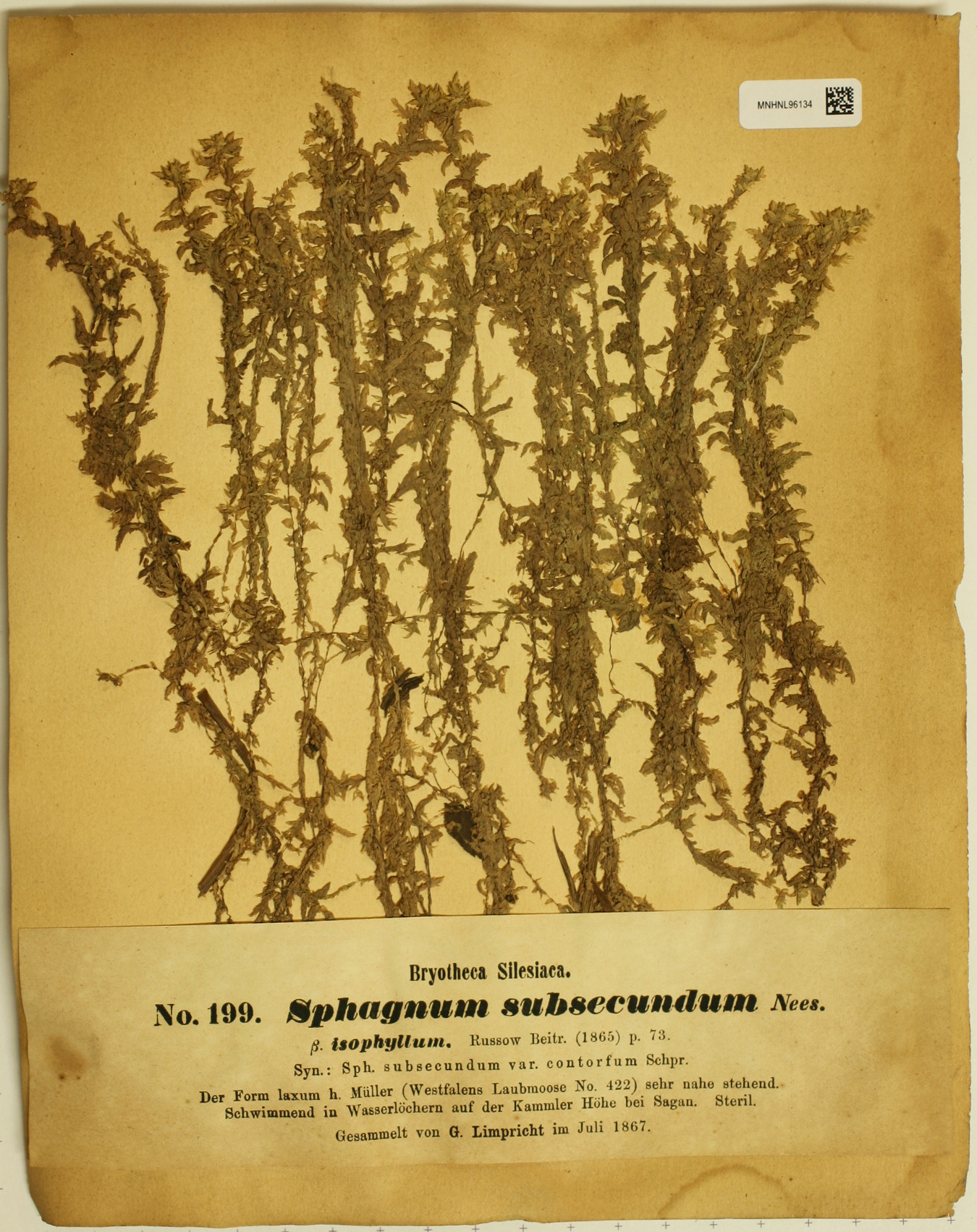
Digitized exsiccata specimen no. 199 Sphagnum subsecundum from the series Bryotheca Silesiaca, edited by Karl Gustav Limpricht; the imaged specimen is preserved in the National Museum of Natural History, Luxembourg (LUX)

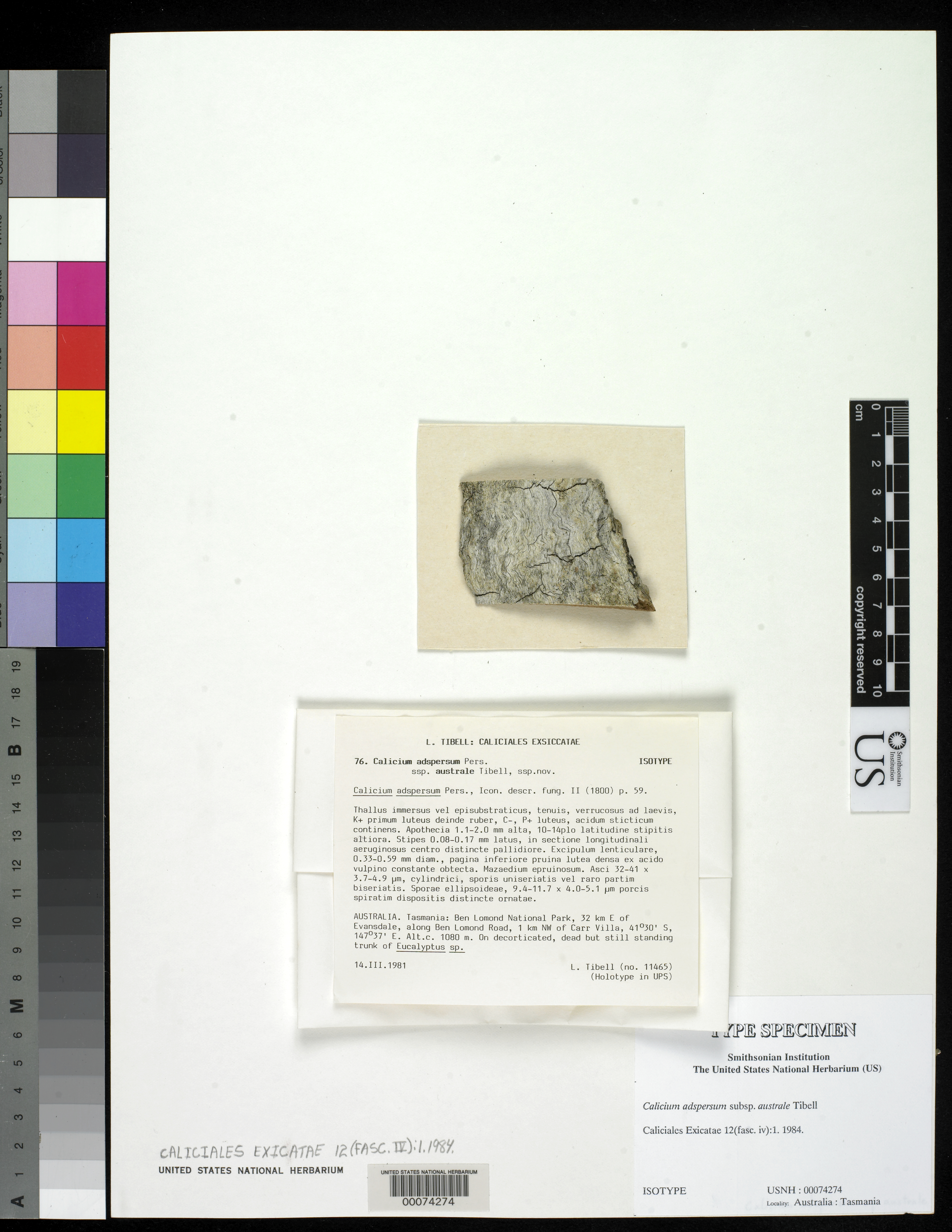
Digitized type specimen of Calicium adspersum subsp. australe, from Caliciales Exsiccatae no. 76 (fasc. IV), edited by Leif Tibell; exsiccata unit no. 76 was collected in Tasmania in 1981; the imaged specimen is preserved in the United States National Herbarium (US)

Approximately 18–20 million of the 400 million botanical specimens in major herbaria belong to the 2,500 widely distributed exsiccatae and exsiccata-like series. The specimens are either incorporated into the general collections of major herbaria or retained there as separate fascicles (see Index Herbariorum). Individual exsiccata items may be specifically indexed in works such as the index to diatoms in published exsiccatae at the Farlow Herbarium. Assigning herbarium specimens to exsiccata series is also a focus of collaborative digitisation projects involving biodiversity collections, such as iDigBio. As a result, many iDigBio portals, such as the Consortium of Midwest Herbaria and the Consortium of Lichen Herbaria, provide dynamic web services for exsiccata series and their individual items. For disambiguation, they use the services of IndExs – Index of Exsiccatae, which provides resolvable, persistent exsiccata identifiers.

Projects to create virtual herbaria are improving early data-management processes and label capture by linking specimen text to standard abbreviations of exsiccata series, using online bibliographies and example label images for disambiguation. Citizen science approaches to herbarium label digitization include instructions on how to recognize exsiccatae and how to record this information in a structured manner. One example is the BGBM Herbonauten guideline. In general, the collections management systems used at major herbaria are able to handle data on exsiccata series and single exsiccata specimens.

Similar to iDigBio, the concept for complete digitization of German herbaria includes the mobilisation of this structured historical information by using a standard reference list of editors, titles, abbreviations, publication dates and number ranges. This procedure will facilitate the discovery of duplicate exsiccata specimens across herbaria and avoid repeated transcription of the same text. The mobilisation of these data has been regarded as a way of creating synergies between institutional herbaria during the digitization process.

== Exsiccata-like series ==
Ideally, exsiccatae consist of dried plant or fungal material obtained through collecting, have a descriptive title, one or more editors (or alternatively an editing organisation), and printed labels; the individual dried specimens bear printed taxon names, locality information and exsiccatal numbers, and are distributed in sets or fascicles. The size of a series varies depending on the work, ranging from only a few to as many as 70 duplicate specimens per numbered unit. Over time, as the aims of organismic botany and mycology changed, departures from this ideal occurred in many respects. There are also exsiccata-like series that distribute preserved natural objects other than dried herbarium material. Examples of published collections of glass slides include series of algal microorganisms such as Diatomacearum species typicae, edited by Hamilton Lanphere Smith, and, in zoology, the work Acarotheca Italica, edited by Antonio Berlese. Other examples are found in published xylotheques, that is, series of mounted thin sections of wood arranged in book-like volumes, such as Querschnitte von hundert Holzarten... edited by Hermann von Nördlinger and American Woods edited by Romeyn Beck Hough.

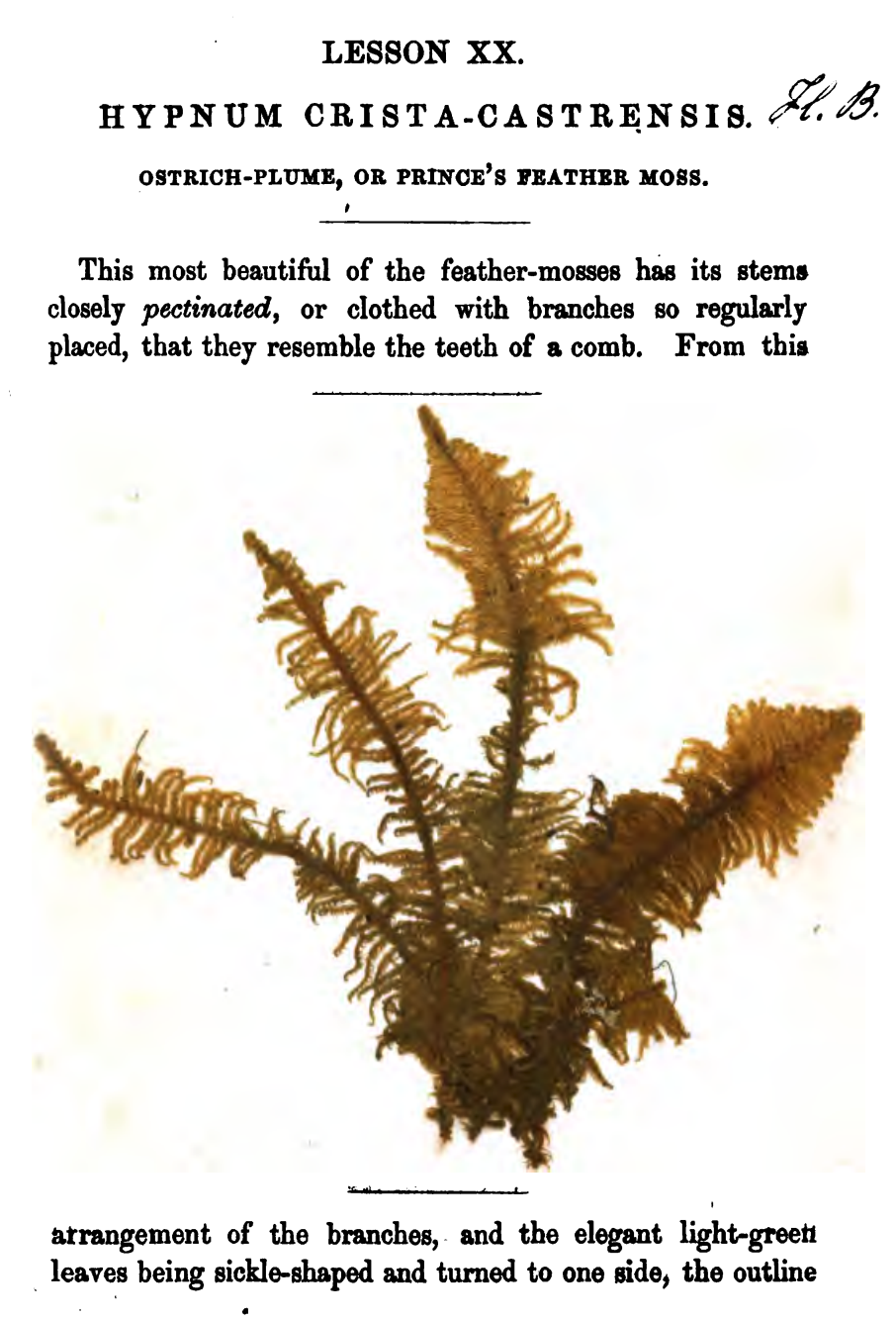
A herbarium specimen of the feather moss now known as Ptilium crista-castrensis, mounted in Gardiner's book Twenty lessons on British Mosses (1850, 3rd ed.)

Particularly in the 19th century, a number of exsiccata-like series and duplicate specimen collections were produced that superficially resemble exsiccatae: some lack descriptive titles and instead carry the name of an organisation as a heading; some do not name an editor; others have labels that are partly handwritten, including handwritten numbers; and some lack sequential numbering, have non-uniform sets, or have schedae that were not published as independent works. Some works, such as William Gardiner's Twenty lessons on British Mosses; first steps to a knowledge of that beautiful tribe of plants ... illustrated with specimens, which included mounted herbarium specimens, were intended primarily for educational purposes. This is also the case with the series Educational collections of Australian plants, edited by Ferdinand von Mueller. These works are regularly treated as library objects.

The 19th century saw an increase in the trade and exchange of plant material. More than 100 societies for plant exchange, mostly with non-commercial aims, were founded. These so-called plant exchange organizations formed citizen-science networks for exchanging plant material among their private members. They regularly announced new material, for example in scientific journals such as Flora (Regensburg). Some of them distributed specimen series with characteristic printed labels superficially resembling exsiccatae, mostly with anonymous editors. One example is the Société Rochelaise pour l'échange des plantes françaises, founded in 1880, which produced around 15 specimen series. In addition to the plant exchange organisations described above, there were learned societies which, among other activities, published and distributed exsiccata-like collections of specimens. The Broterian Society, with Flora Lusitanica (Soc. Brot. 1. anno) and its annual follow-up collections, is one example.

One of the better-known plant exchange organisations, active for more than a century, was the Société Française pour l'échange des plantes vasculaires, which existed from 1911 to 2015. This organisation developed a large worldwide network of plant collectors, drew up guidelines for collectors, and distributed a number of exsiccata-like series, some of them numbered and accompanied by printed labels and booklets. The last exsiccata-like series edited by the Société pour l'Échange des Plantes vasculaires de l'Europe et du Bassin méditerranéen et correspondant began in 1947 and eventually distributed 20,000 specimen units of vascular plants. The last secretary, who in that capacity also served as editor of the series, was Jacques Lambinon.

Few organisations operated on a business model based on selling exsiccatae and exsiccata-like series. An example is the early Unio Itineraria, a society that financially supported the scientific voyages of Georg Wilhelm Schimper and distributed series with printed labels such as Schimper, Unio Itineraria 1835 and others. There were also individuals who began as plant collectors and later turned to dealing in exsiccata-like series. A well-known example is Ignaz Dörfler (1866–1950), who earned a living from this kind of trade for more than twenty years, from 1894 to 1915. Another example is the explorer and plant collector Paul Sintenis (1849–1907). Some modern definitions of the term exsiccata reflect the role of sale and subscription in the distribution of exsiccatae, for example that in A Grammatical Dictionary of Botanical Latin. The recipients and buyers were private plant collectors, as well as learned societies and institutional herbaria. For more than two decades (1908–1932), the journal Herbarium. Organ zur Förderung des Austausches wissenschaftlicher Exsiccatensammlungen, Band I + II, no. 1–86, was published by Theodor Oswald Weigel of Leipzig, who organised the sale of exsiccatae and exsiccata-like series in a professional manner.

In a few cases, the term exsiccata is also used for botanical art works bound as books, containing decorative assortments of pressed plant specimens mounted on the pages and usually arranged around a theme. Such unique herbaria may superficially resemble exsiccata and were at times offered for purchase to academic societies and princely courts, as Giorgio Jan did at the beginning of the 19th century.
