= Astragalus geminus =

Conservation status
- Endangered (IUCN 3.1)

Scientific classification
- Kingdom: Plantae
- Clade: Tracheophytes
- Clade: Angiosperms
- Clade: Eudicots
- Clade: Rosids
- Order: Fabales
- Family: Fabaceae
- Subfamily: Faboideae
- Genus: Astragalus
- Species: A. geminus

Binomial name
- Astragalus geminus Maassoumi

Synonyms
- Astragalus albanicus Grossh., nom. illeg.; Astragalus neoalbanicus Podlech & Sytin, nom. superfl.

Species of legume

Astragalus geminus, synonym Astragalus albanicus, is a species of milkvetch that is native to the east Caucasus. Under the synonym Astragalus albanicus, the 2014 IUCN Red List assessed it as "endangered", stating that it was endemic to the Abşeron and Gobustan districts of Azerbaijan, where it can be found on dry clayey sites and shingle slopes up to the mid montane zone and is threatened by small-scale development.

== Taxonomy ==
The species was first described in 1946 as Astragalus albanicus by Alexander Alfonsovich Grossheim. However, this name had already been published for a different species, Astragalus albanicus Širj. (now regarded as a synonym of Astragalus rumelicus), so was illegitimate. The replacement name Astragalus geminus was published in 1998.
