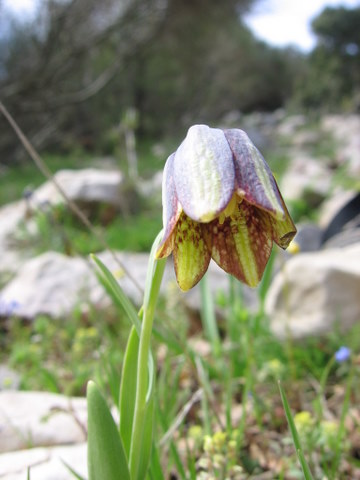

Scientific classification
- Kingdom: Plantae
- Clade: Tracheophytes
- Clade: Angiosperms
- Clade: Monocots
- Order: Liliales
- Family: Liliaceae
- Subfamily: Lilioideae
- Tribe: Lilieae
- Genus: Fritillaria
- Species: F. crassifolia

Binomial name
- Fritillaria crassifolia Boiss. & A.Huet

Synonyms
- Fritillaria ophioglossifolia Freyn & Sint (syn of subsp. crassifolia); Fritillaria poluninii (Rix) Bakhshi Khan. & K.M.Perss. (syn of subsp. poluninii )

= Fritillaria crassifolia =

Species of plant in the family Liliaceae

Fritillaria crassifolia is a Middle Eastern species of bulb-forming flowering plant in the lily family Liliaceae, native to Iran, Iraq, Turkey, Syria, and Lebanon.

Subspecies

- Fritillaria crassifolia subsp. crassifolia - Iran, Turkey, Syria, and Lebanon
- Fritillaria crassifolia subsp. hakkarensis Rix - Iraq, Turkey
- Fritillaria crassifolia subsp. poluninii Rix - Iraq

formerly included

- Fritillaria crassifolia subsp. kurdica (Boiss. & Noë) Rix, now called Fritillaria kurdica
