= Allium koenigianum =

Conservation status
- Data Deficient (IUCN 3.1)

Scientific classification
- Kingdom: Plantae
- Clade: Tracheophytes
- Clade: Angiosperms
- Clade: Monocots
- Order: Asparagales
- Family: Amaryllidaceae
- Subfamily: Allioideae
- Genus: Allium
- Species: A. koenigianum

Binomial name
- Allium koenigianum Grossh.

Species of flowering plant

Allium koenigianum, or Koenig's onion, is a species of onion that is endemic to the Erzurum and Çoruh regions of Turkey.

The species is very rare and quite possibly extinct. It is only known from two records dating from the 1920s.
