= Astragalus acmophylloides =

Sharp-leaved milkvetch

Conservation status
- Critically Endangered (IUCN 3.1)

Scientific classification
- Kingdom: Plantae
- Clade: Tracheophytes
- Clade: Angiosperms
- Clade: Eudicots
- Clade: Rosids
- Order: Fabales
- Family: Fabaceae
- Subfamily: Faboideae
- Genus: Astragalus
- Species: A. acmophylloides

Binomial name
- Astragalus acmophylloides Grossh.

Synonyms
- Astragalus sommieri subsp. acmophylloides (Grossh.) Ponert; Astragalus transcausicus (Boriss.) Boriss.; Tragacantha transcaucasica Boriss.

Species of legume

Astragalus acmophylloides, the sharp-leaved milkvetch, is a species of milkvetch that is endemic to Erzurum and Artvin provinces. in Turkey. It can be found at pine forest edges at about 1,700 m elevation. It is threatened by dam construction and overgrazing.
