= Nigella doerfleri =

Conservation status
- Least Concern (IUCN 3.1)

Scientific classification
- Kingdom: Plantae
- Clade: Tracheophytes
- Clade: Angiosperms
- Clade: Eudicots
- Order: Ranunculales
- Family: Ranunculaceae
- Genus: Nigella
- Species: N. doerfleri

Binomial name
- Nigella doerfleri Vierh.

Species of plant

Nigella doerfleri is a species of flowering plant in the family Ranunculaceae. Native to southern Greece, the Aegean Islands, and Crete, it is a member of the Nigella arvensis species complex. An annual, it is typically found in the subtropical biome at elevations from 0 to 600 m (0 to 2,000 ft). It has been assessed as Least Concern.
