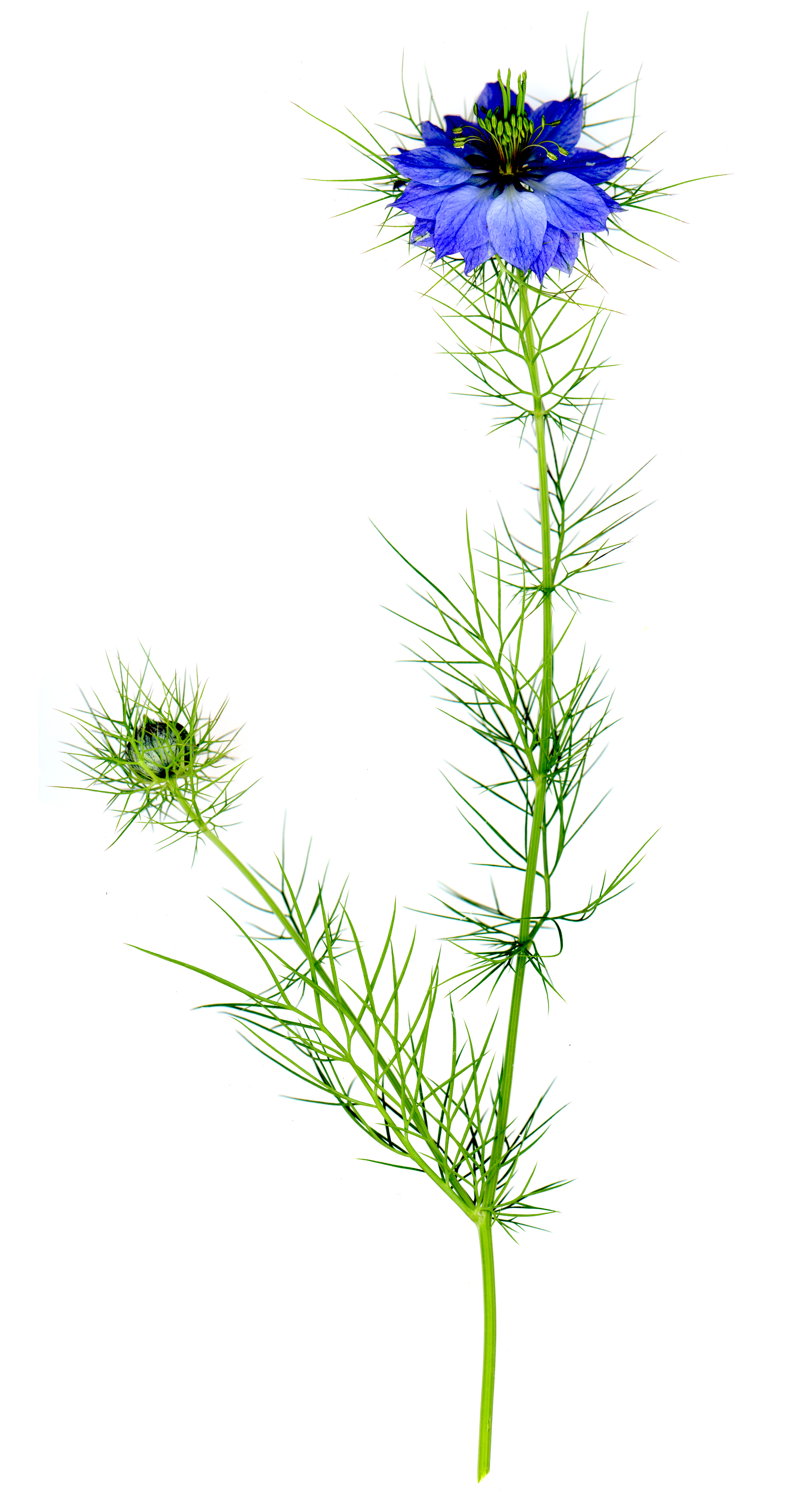
- Nigella damascena

Scientific classification
- Kingdom: Plantae
- Clade: Tracheophytes
- Clade: Angiosperms
- Clade: Eudicots
- Order: Ranunculales
- Family: Ranunculaceae
- Subfamily: Ranunculoideae
- Tribe: Nigelleae
- Genus: Nigella; L.

Species
- Nigella arvensis L.; Nigella bucharica Schipcz.; Nigella carpatha Strid; Nigella ciliaris DC.; Nigella damascena L.; Nigella degenii Vierh.; Nigella deserti Boiss.; Nigella doerfleri Vierh.; Nigella elata Boiss.; Nigella fumariifolia Kotschy; Nigella gallica Jord.; Nigella hispanica L.; Nigella icarica Strid; Nigella integrifolia Regel; Nigella koyuncui Dönmez & Uğurlu; Nigella nigellastrum (L.) Willk.; Nigella orientalis L.; Nigella oxypetala Boiss.; Nigella papillosa G.López; Nigella sativa L.; Nigella segetalis M.Bieb.; Nigella stellaris Boiss.; Nigella stricta Strid; Nigella turcica Dönmez & Mutlu; Nigella unguicularis (Poir.) Spenn.

= Nigella =

Genus of annual plants

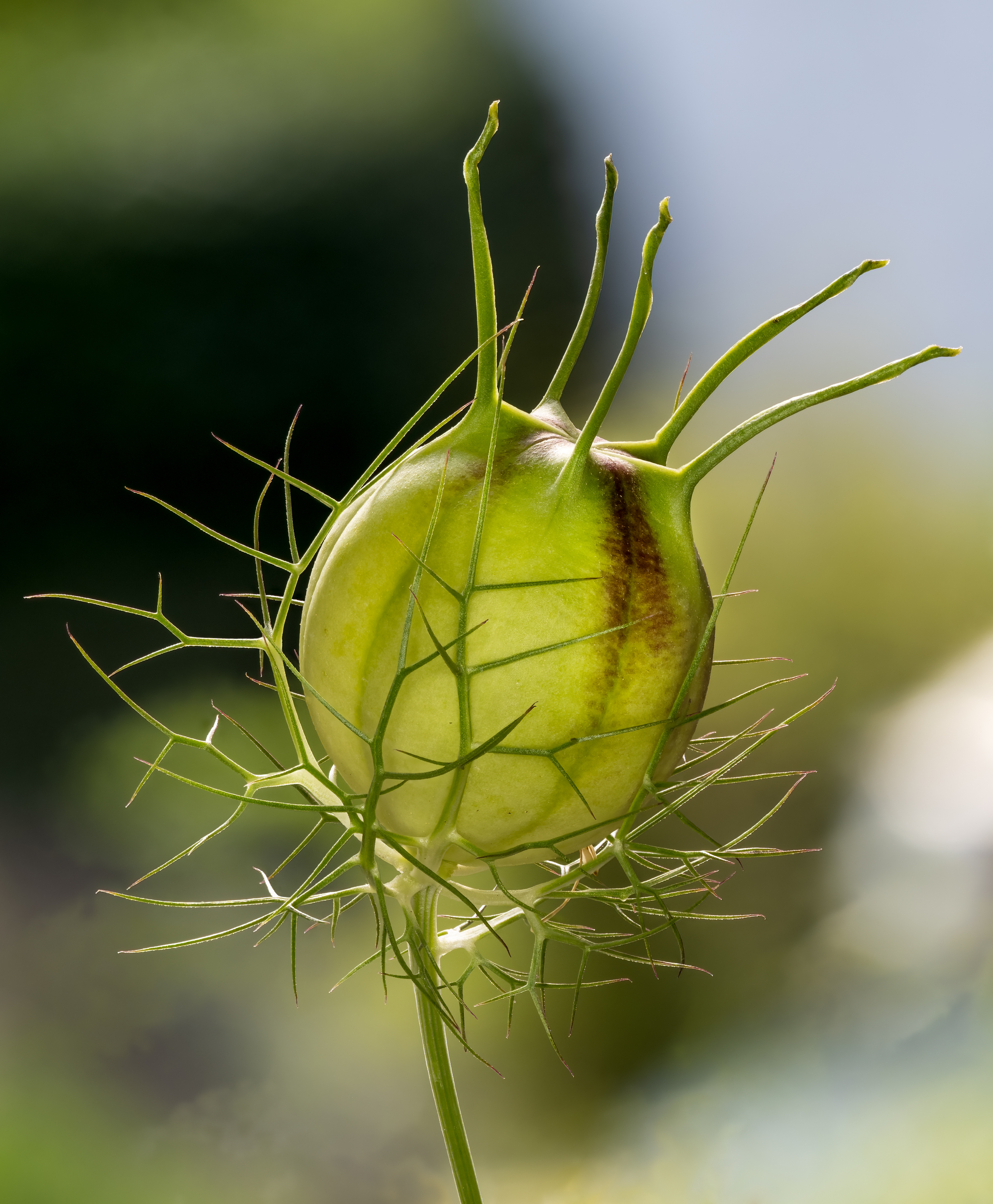
Nigella damascena seed capsule

Nigella is a genus of about 25 species of annual or biennial plants in the family Ranunculaceae, native to Macaronesia, southern and central Europe, North Africa, the Middle East, and Central Asia. Common names applied to members of this genus are nigella, devil-in-a-bush or love-in-a-mist.

The species grow to 20 to 90 cm (8 to 35 in) tall, with finely divided leaves; the leaf segments are narrowly linear to threadlike. The flowers are white, yellow, pink, pale blue or pale purple, with five to ten petals. The fruit is a capsule composed of several united follicles, each containing numerous seeds; in some species (e.g. Nigella damascena), the capsule is large and inflated.

== Uses ==
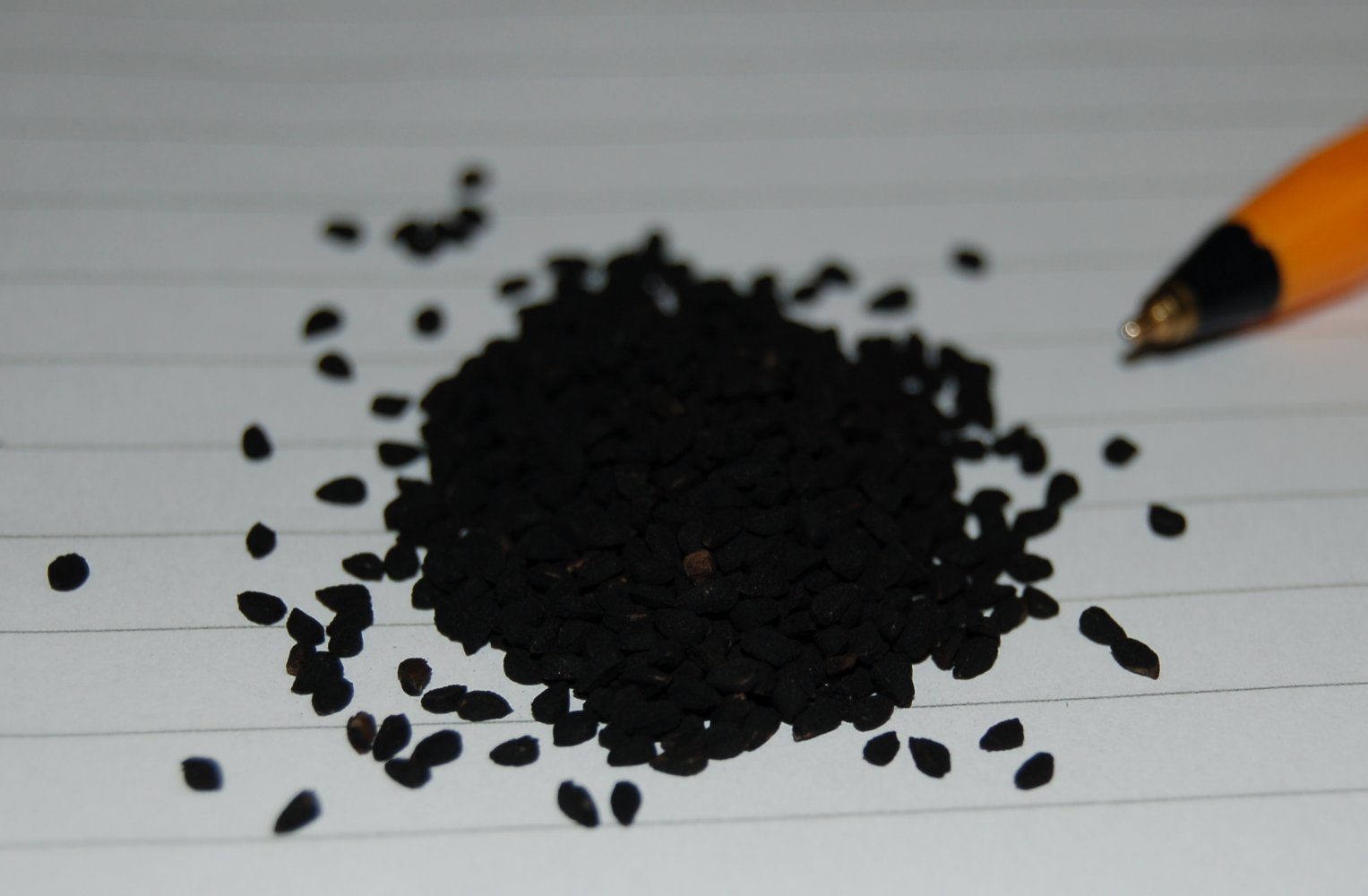
Nigella seeds

=== Culinary ===
The seeds of Nigella sativa, known as kalonji, black cumin, black caraway, black coriander, roman coriander, black onion seed, onion seed, charnushka, git (in historical Roman cuisine), or just nigella, are used as a spice and a condiment in South Asian, Ethiopian, Middle Eastern and Polish cuisines.

=== Garden flowers ===
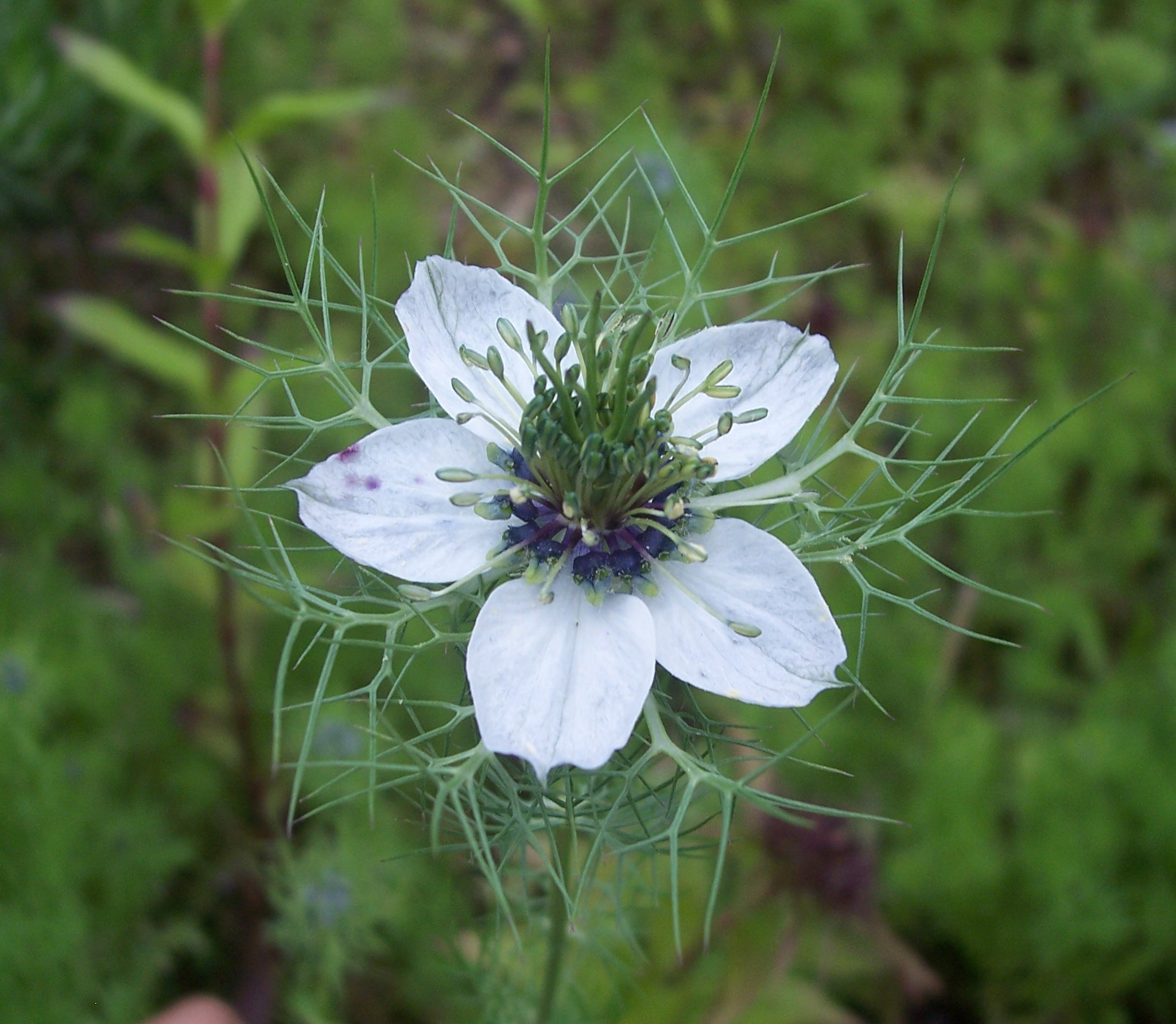
Nigella in full bloom

Several species are grown as ornamental plants in gardens. Nigella damascena has been grown in English cottage gardens since the Elizabethan era, commonly called love-in-a-mist. Nigella hispanica is a taller species with larger blue flowers, red stamens, and grey leaves. Nigella seeds are self-sowing if the seed pods are left to mature.

The dried seed capsules can also be used in flower arrangements.

== Use in traditional medicine ==
In traditional medicine, the seeds are used as a carminative and stimulant to ease bowel and indigestion problems, and are given to treat intestinal worms, nerve defects, to reduce flatulence, and induce sweating. Dried pods are sniffed to restore a lost sense of smell. It is also used to repel some insects, much like mothballs.

Numerous studies have shown that it has anti-inflammatory, anti-oxidative, anti-mycotic, antibacterial, anti-fungal, anti-cancer, anti-viral, antihistamine properties, possessing many properties that make it a potential remedy against certain diseases.

Black cumin is used by naturopaths. Black cumin oil and powder are sold to people suffering from pathologies such as skin diseases, muscle pain, eczema or psoriasis, but also acne, diabetes, and asthma,
