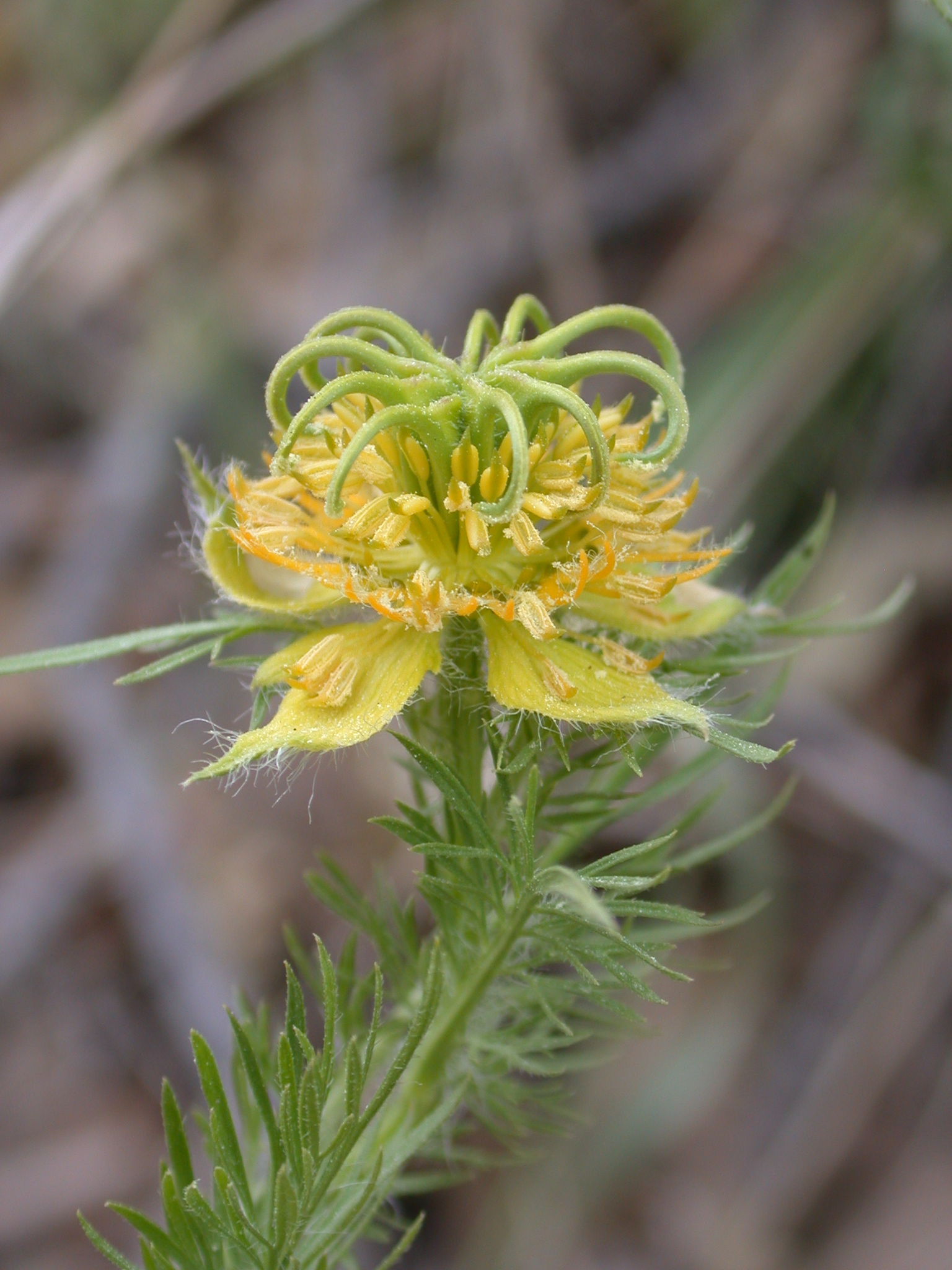
- Close-up of flower
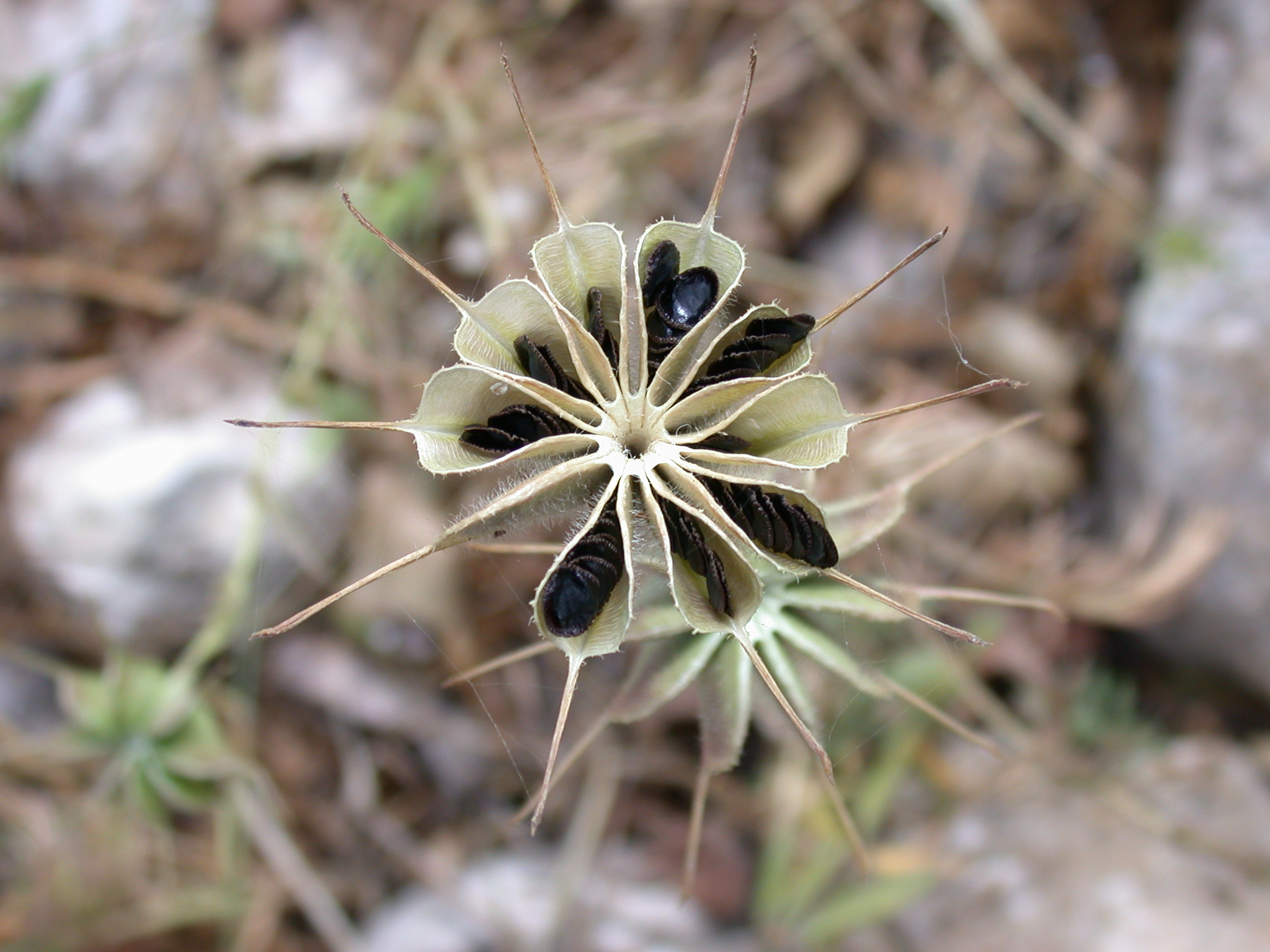
- Seed pods

Scientific classification
- Kingdom: Plantae
- Clade: Tracheophytes
- Clade: Angiosperms
- Clade: Eudicots
- Order: Ranunculales
- Family: Ranunculaceae
- Genus: Nigella
- Species: N. ciliaris

Binomial name
- Nigella ciliaris DC.

Synonyms
- Nigellastrum ciliare (DC.) Bercht. & J.Presl

= Nigella ciliaris =

Species of plant

Nigella ciliaris, the pinwheel nigella or ciliate love-in-a-mist, is a species of flowering plant in the family Ranunculaceae. It is native to Cyprus and the Levant. A therophytic annual reaching 25 to 35 cm (10 to 14 in), it is typically found in the garrigue. It is occasionally cultivated for its pinwheel-like yellow flowers and its dramatic, long-lasting seedheads.
