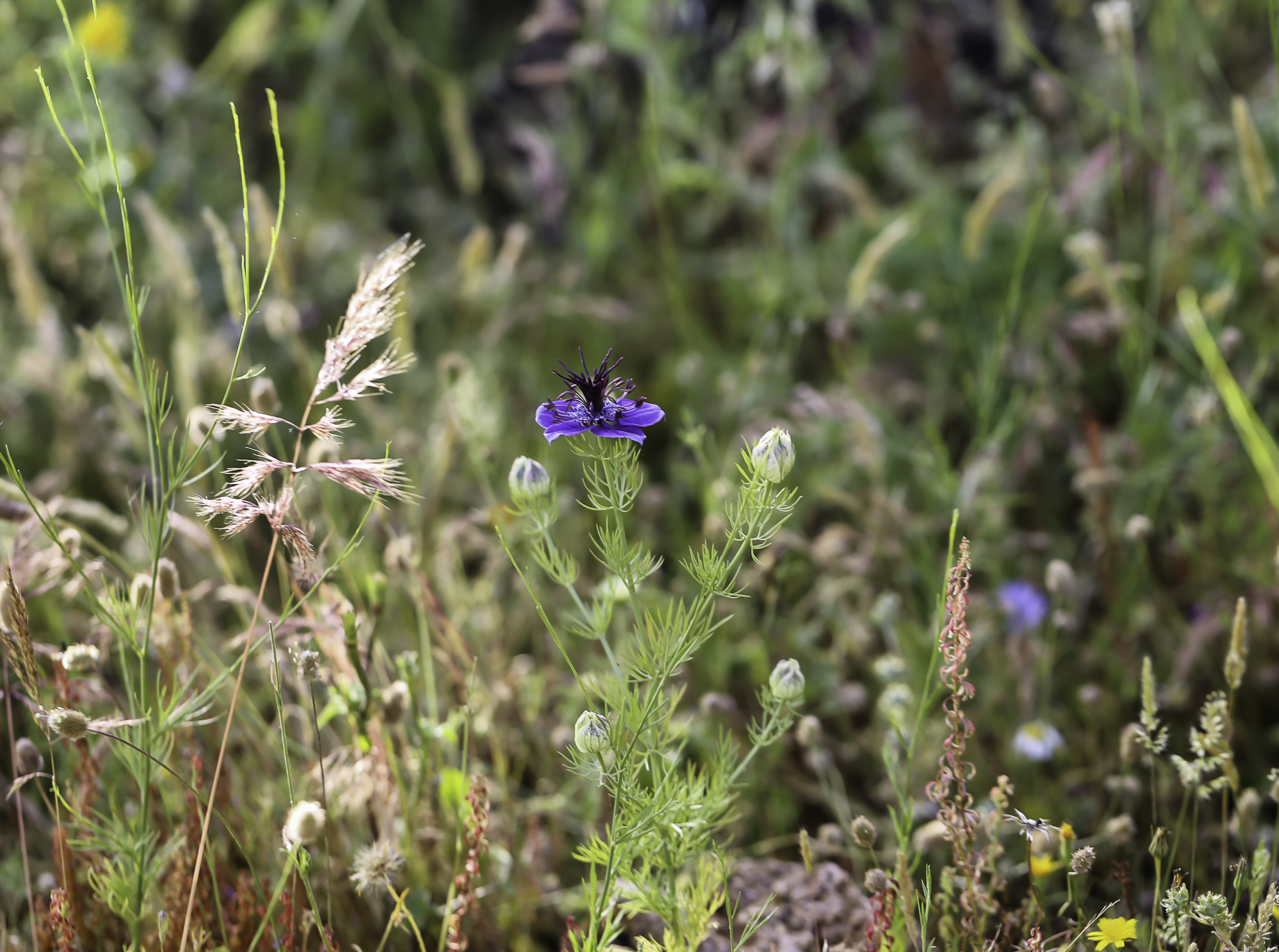
- Nigella papillosa subsp. atlantica

Scientific classification
- Kingdom: Plantae
- Clade: Tracheophytes
- Clade: Angiosperms
- Clade: Eudicots
- Order: Ranunculales
- Family: Ranunculaceae
- Genus: Nigella
- Species: N. papillosa

Binomial name
- Nigella papillosa G.López

Synonyms
- Nigella arvensis subsp. atlantica (Murb.) Malag.; Nigella arvensis var. intermedia (Coss.) Batt.; Nigella atlantica (Murb.) Rivas Mart.; Nigella hispanica subsp. atlantica Murb.; Nigella hispanica var. intermedia Coss.; Nigella hispanica var. papillosa (G.López) J.-M.Tison

= Nigella papillosa =

Species of plant

Nigella papillosa is a species of flowering plant in the family Ranunculaceae. It is native to the Azores, Morocco, Algeria, Tunisia, Portugal, Spain, and Sicily. An upright but bushy annual reaching 50 cm (20 in), it has blue, purple, or white flowers. A number of cultivars are available, including 'African Bride', 'Delft Blue', and 'Midnight'.

== Subtaxa ==
The following subspecies are accepted:

- Nigella papillosa subsp. atlantica (Murb.) Amich ex G.López – entire range
- Nigella papillosa subsp. papillosa – Portugal, southwestern Spain
