= Ignaz Dörfler =

Austrian botanist (1866–1950)

In 1893

Ignaz Emanuel Dörfler (19 June 1866 – 26 August 1950) was an Austrian botanist and collector of plants, autographs, and postmarks. He traded extensively in botanical specimens. He lived in Vienna and described several species of plants.

== Life and work ==
Dörfler was born, the son of forester Ignaz Anton (b. 1834) and Maria Magdalena Anna Dörfler, née Götz, on 19 June 1866 in Vienna, Austrian Empire. He was sent to Kremsmünster Stiftsgymnasium run by Benedictine monks. He studied natural history under Benedictine priest Anselm Pfeiffer. He was dismissed from the school for placing a garland of sausages around the statue of a saint. He then studied at a Gymnasium in Ried im Innkreis. Here he studied botany under Friedrich Vierhapper (senior) but did not complete his studies. He then became a demonstrator and caretaker of the botanical garden in the University of Vienna working under Anton Kerner von Marilaun. In 1891 he became an accounting intern and he joined the royal service at the Royal Natural History Museum. In 1892 he was made a staff of the botany department and was involved in working on the recently acquired collections of Heinrich Gustav Reichenbach.

He published "centuries" 31–38 of the exsiccata series "Herbarium Normale" begun by F. W. Schultz. He curated herbarium specimens as a profession and dealed with exsiccata-like specimen series collected by botanist explorers like Alfon S. Callier, Ferdynand Karo and Gregorio Rigo, e.g. the series F. Karo: Plantae Amuricae et Zeaënsae curavit I. Dörfler. From 1920 to 1937 he curated the collections of the Botanical Institute of the University of Vienna. He collected autographed letters of botanists. He sold them to Uppsala after the First World War.

Dörfler chaired the Vienna Botanical Exchange Society (“Wiener Botanischer Tauschverein”) from 1892. He married and had two daughters. He collected in parts of the Ottaman Empire including the Balkans as well as in Europe. He made a trade of plants and his autograph and postmark collections. This commercial activity led to conflict with the head of the herbarium, Günther Beck von Mannagetta und Lerchenau and was dismissed.

He continued his collecting and sale of specimens and expanded his business. Valuable specimens he traded in included a large Welwitschia mirabilis. He explored Albanian and Macedonian areas with Árpád von Degen. He explored the Voras Mountains area in 1893. He married Maria Josefa Reichel (b. 1876) from Meziměstí, Bohemia, in 1896 and their daughters were Maria Barbara Ignazia (born 1897, she later took part in botanical work) and Elisabeth (born 1898). Dörfler participated in the Second Botanical Congress in Vienna, 1905. In 1915 he received a position in the botanical institute under Richard Wettstein Ritter von Westersheim. He replaced the position held by Joseph Brunnthaler. He went on two collecting trips to Albania. In 1937 he retired and moved to live in the fourteenth district of Vienna. He died in Vienna at the age of 84 and was buried in the Baumgarten Cemetery.

=== Eponymous taxa ===
Dörfler described several species and other botanists named several taxa in his honour. Of these the ones that have not sunk in synonmy include:

- Asperula doerfleri Wettst.
- Draba doerfleri Wettst.
- Linum doerfleri Rech
- Paramoltkia doerfleri (Wettst.) Grenter & Burdet
- Petasites doefleri Hayek
- Tulipa doerfleri Gand.
- Thymus doerfleri Ronniger
- Viola doerfleri Degen
- Nigella doerfleri Vierh.

== Published work ==
- Botaniker Porträts

== See also ==
- Heinrich Gustav Reichenbach
- Julius Wiesner
