= IDigBio =

Biodiversity data aggregator

Integrated Digitized Biocollections (iDigBio)
- Gainesville, Florida
- Established: 2011
- Location: 105 NW 16th St., Gainesville, Florida
- Coordinates: 29.63583°N 82.37028°W
- Type: NSF Funded Grant
- Founders: PIs: Larry Page, Pam Soltis, Bruce MacFadden, José Fortes and Greg Riccardi
- Website: Official website

iDigBio, Integrated Digitized Biocollections, is the National Resource funded by the National Science Foundation (NSF) for Advancing Digitization of Biodiversity Collections (ADBC). Through iDigBio, data and images for millions of biological specimens are being curated, connected and made available in electronic format for the biological research community, government agencies, students, educators, and the general public.

== Mission ==
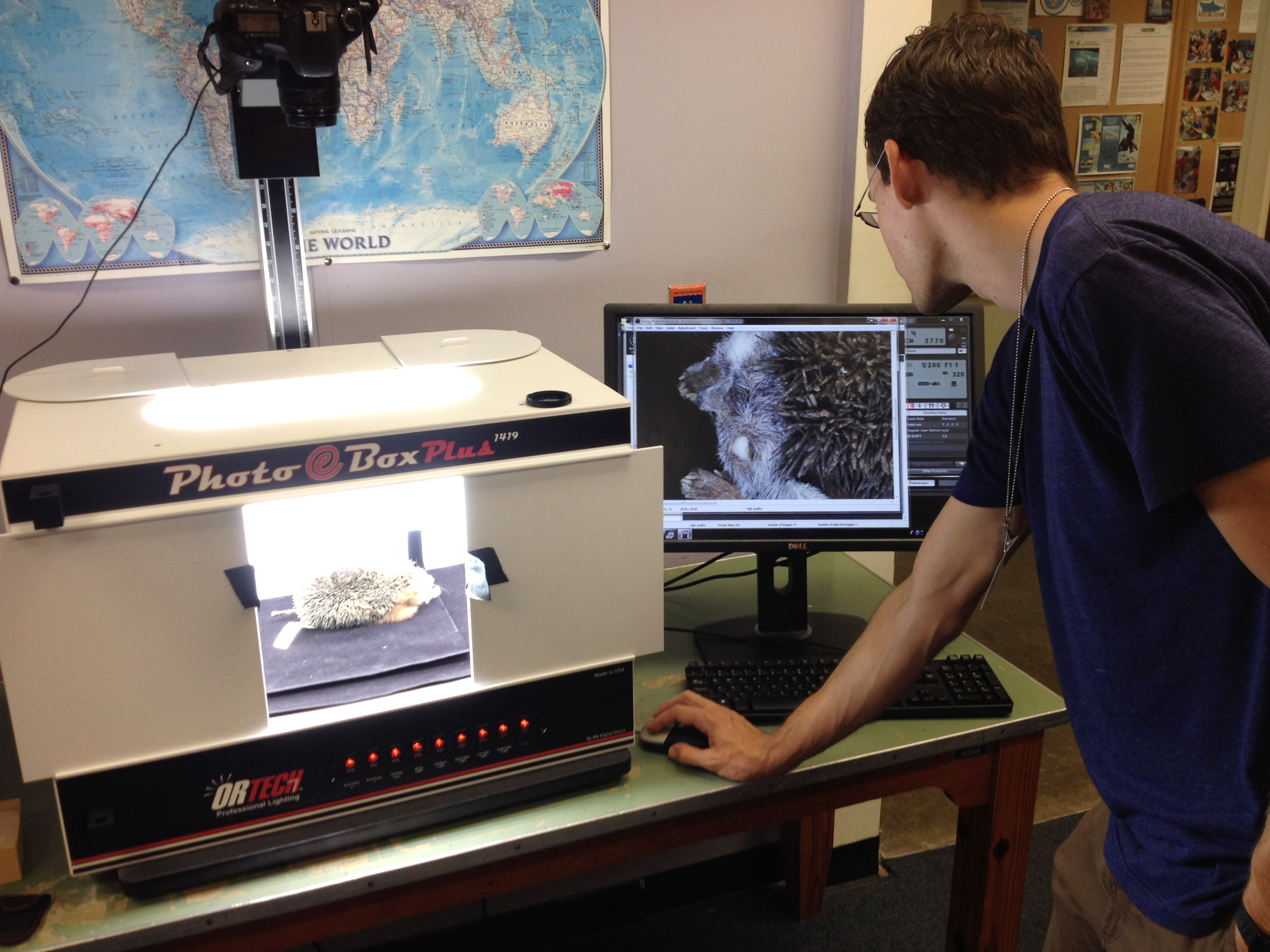
Digitization of mammal specimens using a lightbox and camera

The mission of iDigBio is to develop a national infrastructure that supports the vision of ADBC by overseeing implementation of standards and best practices for digitization; building and deploying a customized cloud computing environment for collections; recruiting and training personnel, including underserved groups; engaging the research community, collections community, citizen scientists, and the public through education and outreach activities; and planning for long-term sustainability of the national digitization effort.

iDigBio enables digitization of data from all U.S. biological collections and integrates those data to make them broadly available and useful with shared standards and formats. Ultimately, ADBC will further the discovery and understanding of biological diversity, and iDigBio will engage the research, collections, and education communities in a spirit of collaboration that will open biological research collections to new downstream user communities. The vision for ADBC is a permanent repository of digitized information from all U.S. biological collections that leads to new discoveries through research and a better understanding and appreciation of biodiversity through improved outreach, which then leads to improved environmental and economic policies. Creation of the permanent digitized repository is occurring in four stages:

1. An initial stage where the effort to digitize U.S. biological collections is catalyzed by funding from NSF and enabled by iDigBio activities that foster collaborations, identify priorities, demonstrate the value of biodiversity and collections, and generate information on best practices related to standards, workflows, and data management.
2. An intermediate stage where digitization at Thematic Collections Networks (TCNs), Partners to Existing Networks (PENs), and other participating institutions/networks improves methods and strategies and demonstrates the scientific and societal benefits of validated and readily accessible data.
3. A third stage in which the vision for ADBC is realized through participation by all U.S. institutions with biological collections.
4. A fourth stage in which digitization is a routine and sustained practice in all institutions with biological collections, and the national database is easily accessible as an up-to-date source of information on biodiversity

== Scope ==
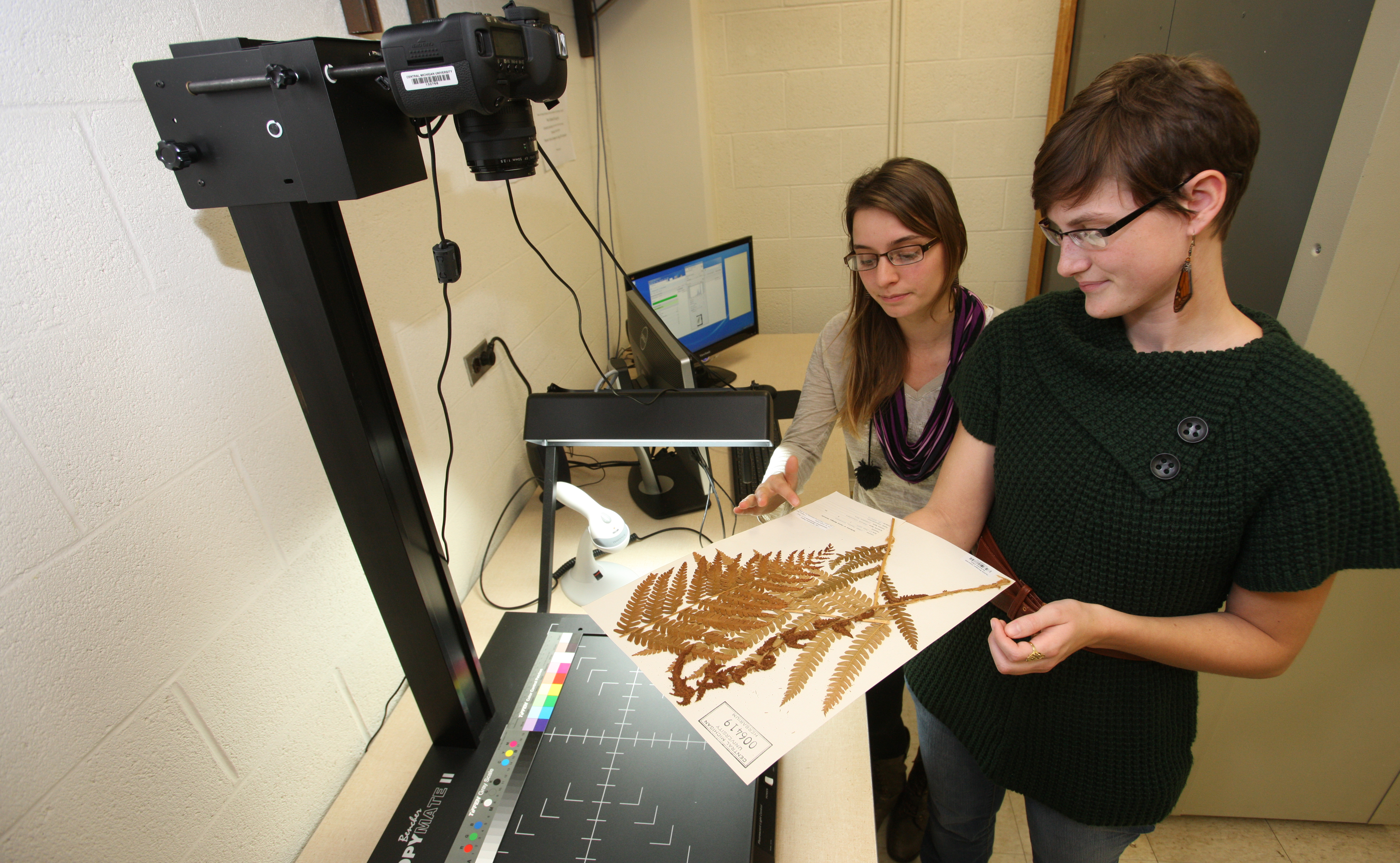
Digitizing herbarium specimens

iDigBio is the national resource for digitized information about vouchered natural history collections within the context established by the NIBA community strategic plan and is supported through funds from the NSF ADBC program. As such, iDigBio serves as the administrative home for the national digitization effort; fosters partnerships and innovations; facilitates the determination and dissemination of digitization practices and workflows; establishes integration and interconnectivity among the data generated by collection digitization projects; and promotes the uses of biological/paleontological collections data by the scientific community and stakeholders including government agencies, educational institutions, non-governmental organizations (NGOs), and other national and international entities to benefit science and society through enhanced research, educational, and outreach activities. iDigBio provides these services to all stakeholders with clarity, simplicity, transparency, intuitive methodology, and intuitive design.

The iDigBio HUB is based at the University of Florida (UF), in partnership with Florida State University (FSU). In addition to the iDigBio central digitization HUB, there are partner institutions referred to as "Thematic Collections Networks" (TCNs) and associated "Partners To Existing Networks" (PENs) which consists of networks of institutions with a strategy for digitizing information that addresses a particular research theme. Through the iDigBio HUB cyberinfrastructure, compilation and the inter-linking of data from the TCNs and existing collaborative databases will create opportunities to address research questions and education interests regarding biodiversity, climate change, species invasions, natural disasters, and the spread of pests and diseases. New TCNs will be funded in succeeding years based on solicitations from NSF.

== History ==
In 2021, the NSF awarded iDigBio a further $20 million in funds.
