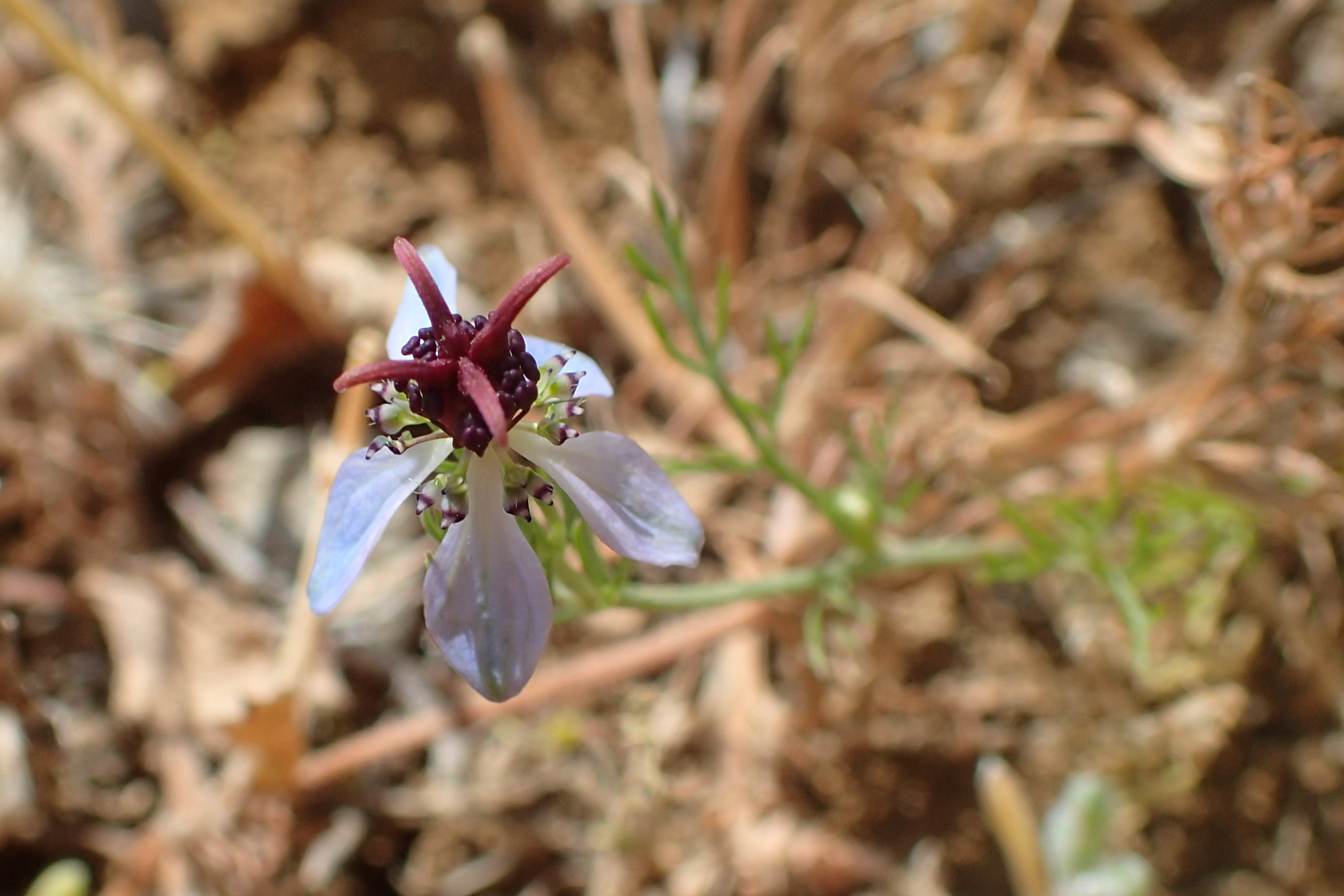
- In Armenia
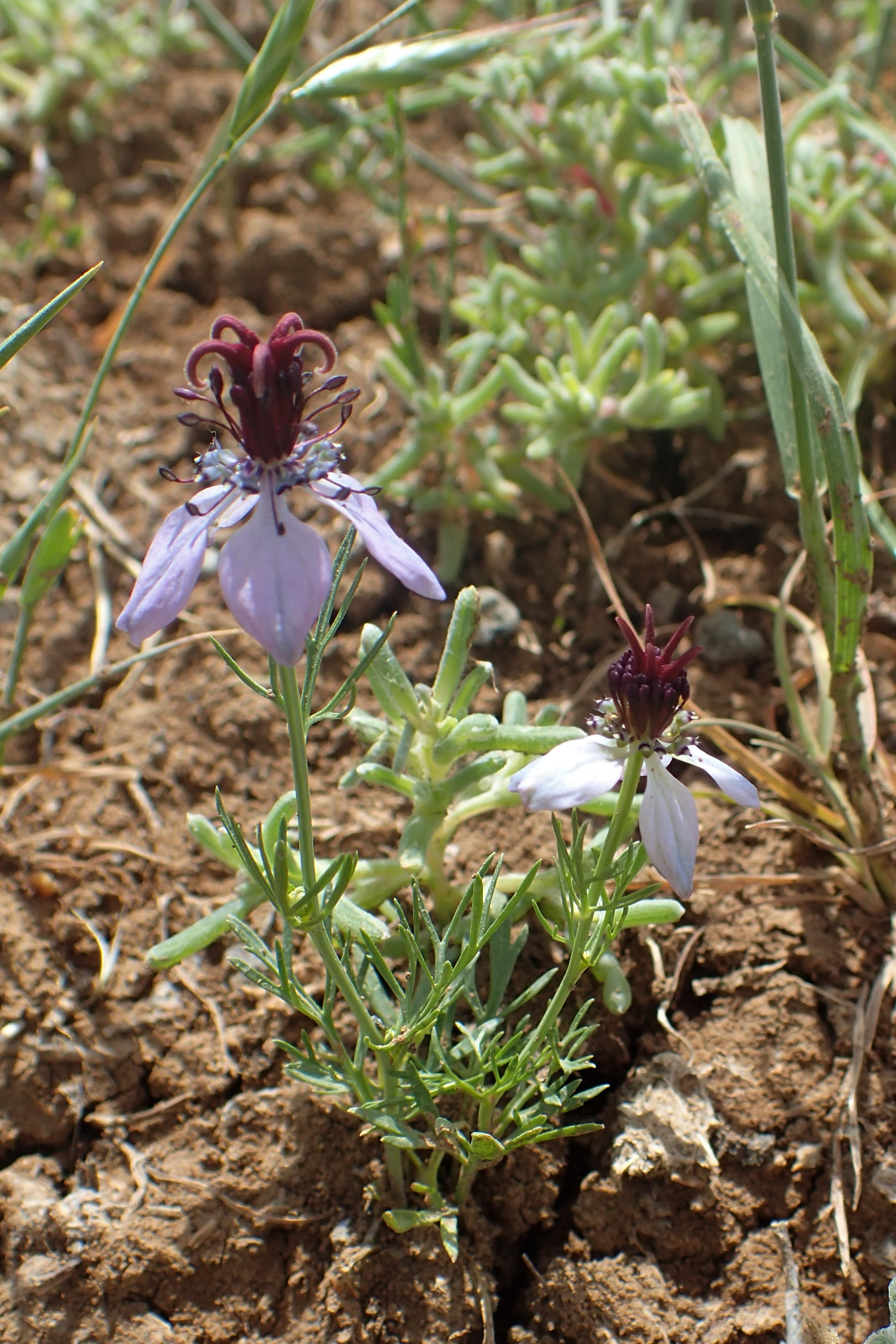
- Habit

Scientific classification
- Kingdom: Plantae
- Clade: Tracheophytes
- Clade: Angiosperms
- Clade: Eudicots
- Order: Ranunculales
- Family: Ranunculaceae
- Genus: Nigella
- Species: N. segetalis

Binomial name
- Nigella segetalis M.Bieb.

Synonyms
- Nigella armena Steven; Nigella arvensis Pall. ex M.Bieb.; Nigella bicolor Boiss. & Heldr.; Nigella foeniculacea Hohen. ex Boiss.; Nigella segetalis var. armena (Steven) Boiss.; Nigella verrucosa K.Koch

= Nigella segetalis =

Species of plant

Nigella segetalis is a species of flowering plant in the family Ranunculaceae. It is native to the Black Sea region as far as northwestern Iran. An annual, it is typically found in the temperate zone. An analysis of seed coat morphology places it as a sister taxon to Nigella gallica, found in southwestern Europe, with both distinct from other members of the genus.
