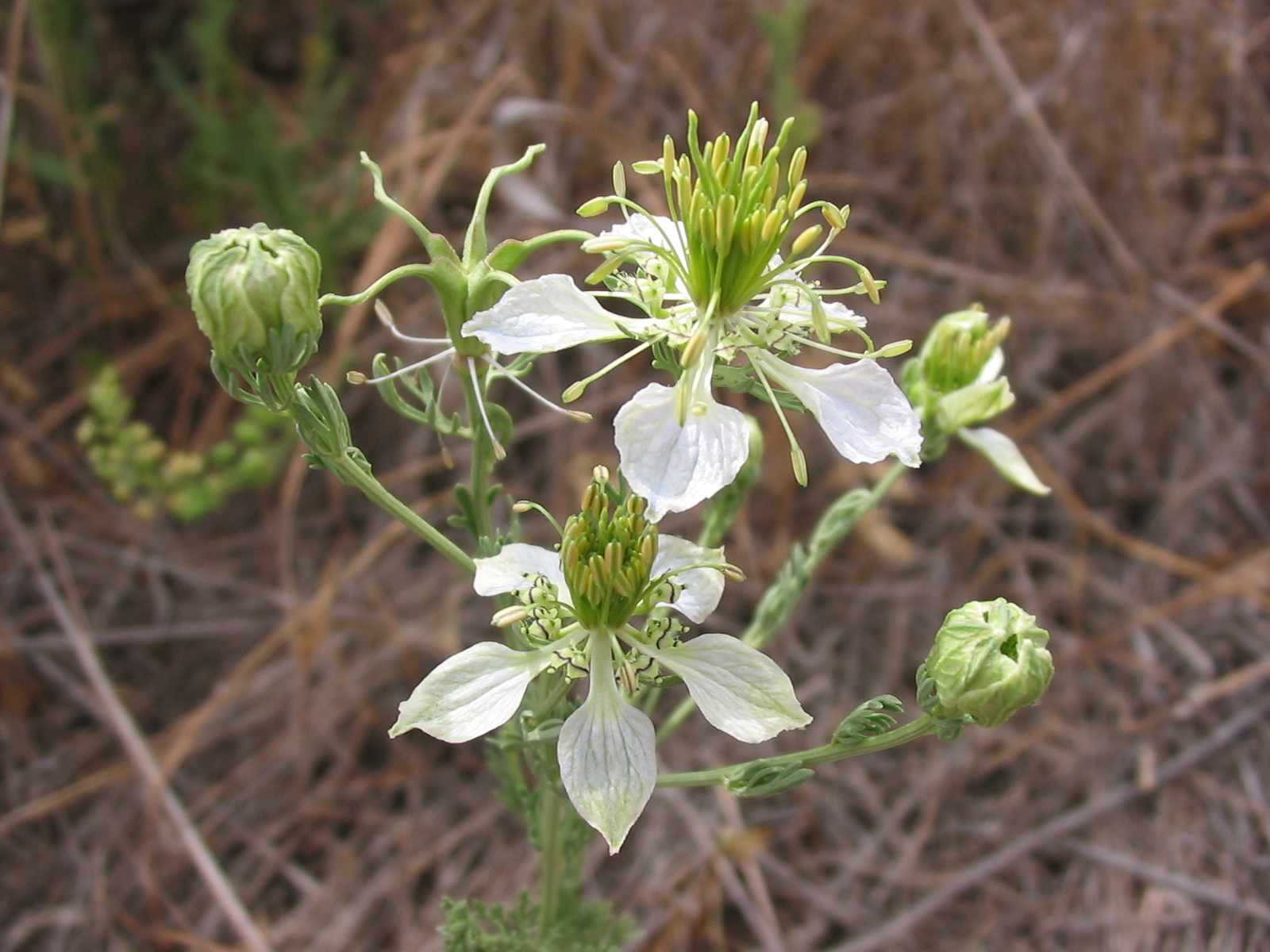
- An individual with white petals

Scientific classification
- Kingdom: Plantae
- Clade: Tracheophytes
- Clade: Angiosperms
- Clade: Eudicots
- Order: Ranunculales
- Family: Ranunculaceae
- Genus: Nigella
- Species: N. gallica

Binomial name
- Nigella gallica Jord.

Synonyms
- Nigella confusa Salle ex Nyman; Nigella hispanica proles gallica (Jord.) Rouy & Foucaud

= Nigella gallica =

Species of plant

Nigella gallica is a species of flowering plant in the family Ranunculaceae. It is native to southwestern Europe; Portugal, Spain (including the Baleares), and France. An annual, it is typically found in the subtropical zone. An analysis of seed coat morphology places it as a sister taxon to Nigella segetalis, found in the Black Sea area, with both distinct from other members of the genus.
