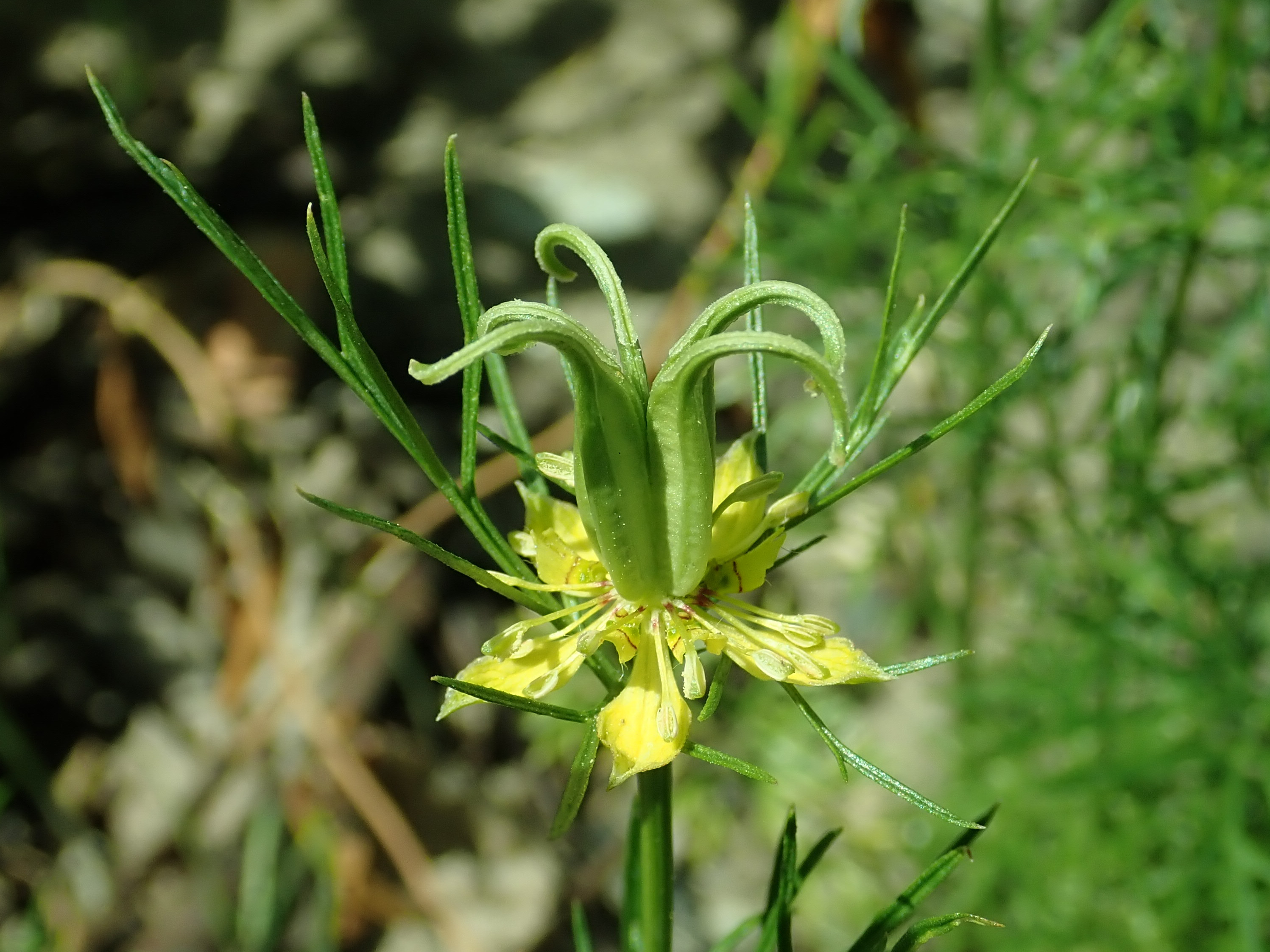
- Close-up of flower
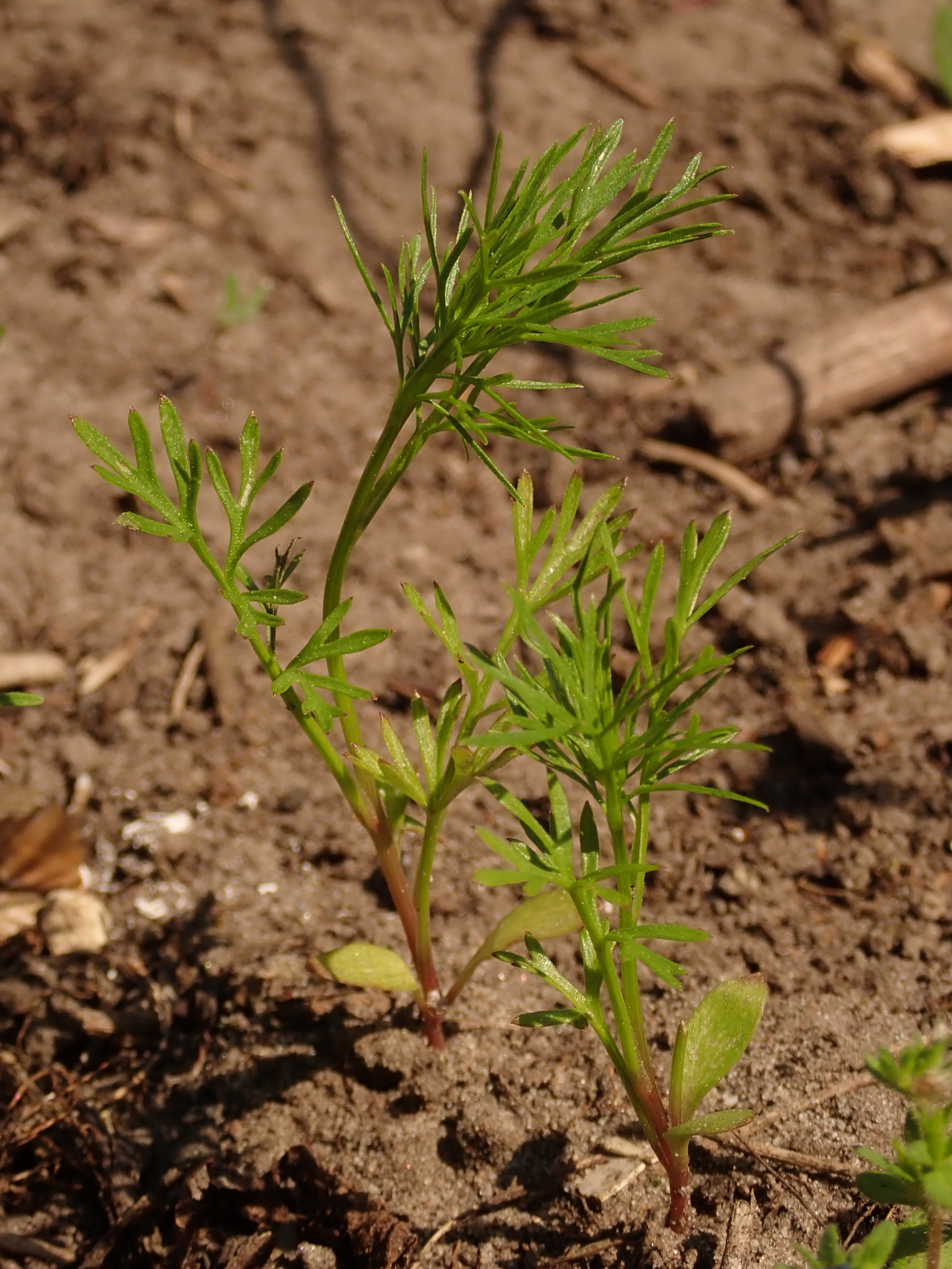
- Immature individuals

Scientific classification
- Kingdom: Plantae
- Clade: Tracheophytes
- Clade: Angiosperms
- Clade: Eudicots
- Order: Ranunculales
- Family: Ranunculaceae
- Genus: Nigella
- Species: N. orientalis

Binomial name
- Nigella orientalis L.

Synonyms
- Nigella corniculata DC.; Nigellastrum corniculatum (DC.) Bercht. & J.Presl; Nigellastrum flavum Moench; Nigellastrum orientale (L.) Bercht. & J.Presl

= Nigella orientalis =

Species of plant

Nigella orientalis, the yellow fennel flower, is a species of flowering plant in the family Ranunculaceae. It is native to Ukraine, Bulgaria, Greece, the eastern Aegean Islands, Turkey, the Transcaucasus, Lebanon, Syria, and northern Iran, and it has been introduced to southern European Russia. A 20 to 40 in (0.5 to 1.0 m) tall annual or biennial with highly dissected leaves, it is typically found in temperate areas. There appears to be a cultivar, 'Transformer'.
