= Fritillaria kurdica =

Scientific classification
- Kingdom: Plantae
- Clade: Embryophytes
- Clade: Tracheophytes
- Clade: Angiosperms
- Clade: Monocots
- Order: Liliales
- Family: Liliaceae
- Subfamily: Lilioideae
- Genus: Fritillaria
- Species: F. kurdica

Binomial name
- Fritillaria kurdica Boiss. & Noë

Synonyms
- Synonymy: Fritillaria crassifolia subsp. kurdica (Boiss. & Noë) Rix; Fritillaria wanensis Freyn; Fritillaria karadaghensis Turrill; Fritillaria foliosa Bornm.; Fritillaria grossheimiana Losinsk.

Species of flowering plant

Fritillaria kurdica (Kurdish: Şilêra sernuxwîn ,شلێره‌ سه‌رنخوونک،سووسەن گۆڵ) is a Middle Eastern species of bulb-forming flowering plant in the lily family Liliaceae. It is native to Iran, kurdistan region of Iraq, Turkey, and the Caucasus. The species is sometimes cultivated in other regions as an ornamental.

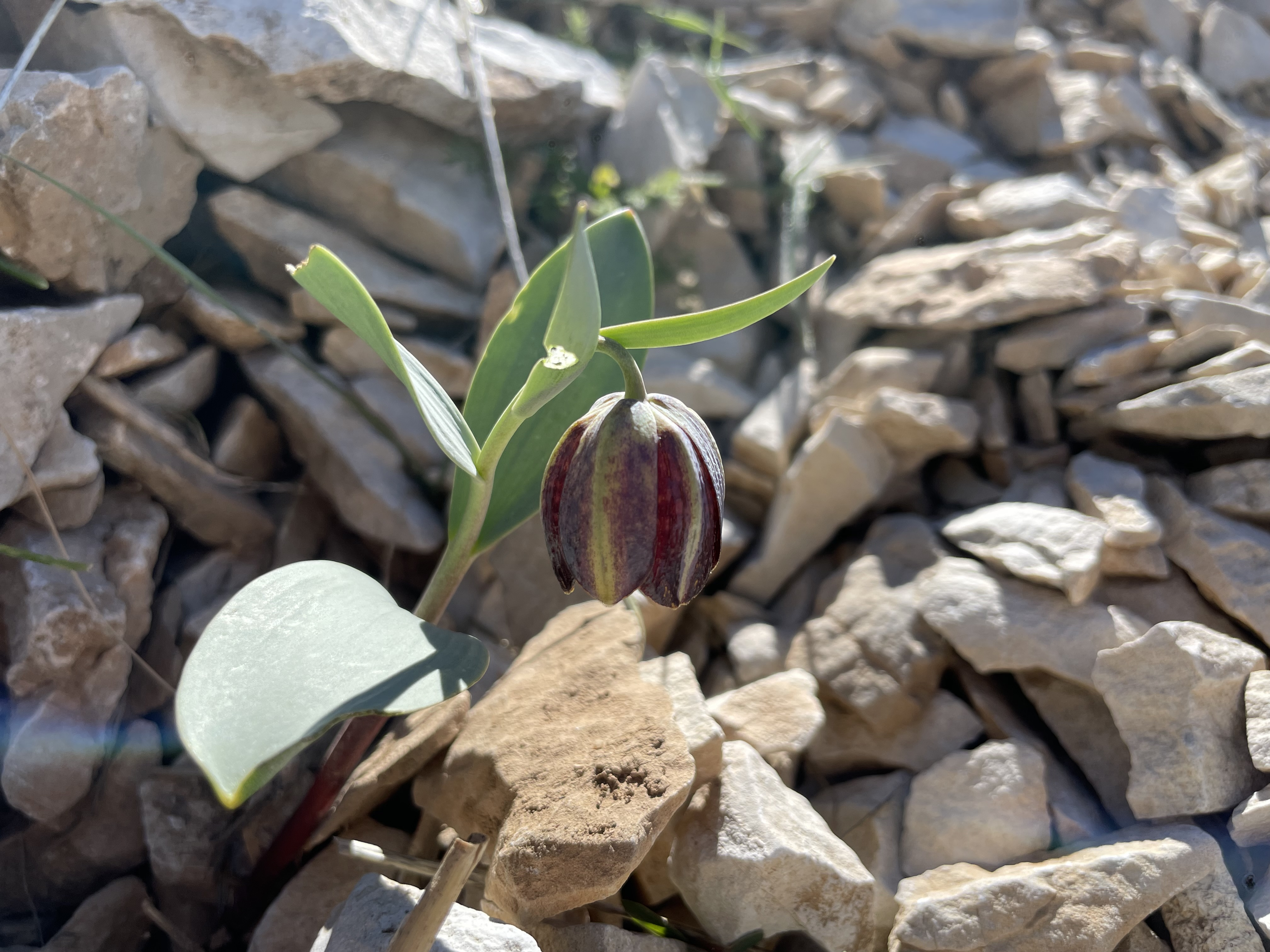
Fritillaria kurdica on Azmar Mountain, Sulaymani, Kurdistan

Fritillaria Kurdica (full name, "Fritillaria Kurdica. Bulletin of Kurdish Studies") is also the name of an academic periodical published in Poland, devoted to the study of the culture and history of the Kurdish people.
