= Alexander Alfonsovich Grossheim =

Russian Soviet botanist (1888–1948)

- Born: 6 March 1888; Lichovka, Russian Empire
- Died: 4 December 1948 (aged 60)
- Education: University of Moscow
- Known for: Taxonomy
- Scientific career
- Fields: Botany
- Workplaces: Azerbaijan Institute of Botany; Komarov Botanical Institute; St. Petersburg University
- Author abbrev. (botany): Grossh

Alexander Alfonsovich Grossheim (6 March 1888 – 4 December 1948) was a Soviet botanist of German descent. He traveled widely over the Caucasus region collecting and studying various different plant life. He is most known for Pteridophytes and Spermatophytes species.

== Biography ==
Alexander Alfonsovich Grossheim (or Grossgeim) was born in Likhovka, Russian Empire (now Lykhivka in Dnipropetrovsk Oblast, Ukraine). He was an expert on the flora of the Caucasus.

After graduating from University of Moscow with a doctorate in 1912, he became the director of the Azerbaijan Institute of Botany.

In 1919, he described Fritillaria grandiflora, which later re-classified as a subspecies of Fritillaria kotschyena and Fritiallaria tatianae. Together with Boris Schischkin he published the exsiccata series Plantae orientales exsiccatae (1924-1928).

From 1929 he moved to the Tiflis (Tbilisi) Botanic Garden in Georgia. He still carried on plant collecting expeditions in the Caucasus.

Between 1928 and 1934, he recorded up to 5767 plant species (out of the 6200 recorded species) in his volumes of Flora Kavaza (Flora of the Caucasus, 1928–1934). In 1939, he started a second volume with annotated maps.

In 1946, Grossheim was appointed curator of the Caucasian Herbarium at the Komarov Botanical Institute in Leningrad (Saint Petersburg), and also director of the Department of Plant Systematics and Morphology at St. Petersburg University. When he died in 1948, he was still working on the second edition of his Flora Kavkaza, which was continued by his colleague Andrei Fedorov.

Losina-Losinskaya named Fritillaria grossheimiana in his honour, but this is now thought to be a synonym of Fritillaria crassifolia subsp. kurdica.

The genus Grossheimia Sosn. & Takht. (synonym Centaurea) was named in his honour. Grossheimiana was also used as a name for a subgenus of grasses.

== Other sources ==
- T. Geideman, 1949, Botanicheskii Zhurnal, 34: 336-337
- S.G. Shetler, 1967, The Komarov Botanical Institute: 113. References Brummitt, R.K. & Powell,
- C.E., Authors Pl. Names (1992): 244
- Harrison, S.G., Ind. Coll. Welsh Nat. Herb. (1985): 46
- Lanjouw, J. & Stafleu, F.A., Index Herb. Coll. E-H (1957): 241
- Vegter, H.I., Index Herb. Coll. N-R (1983): 842
