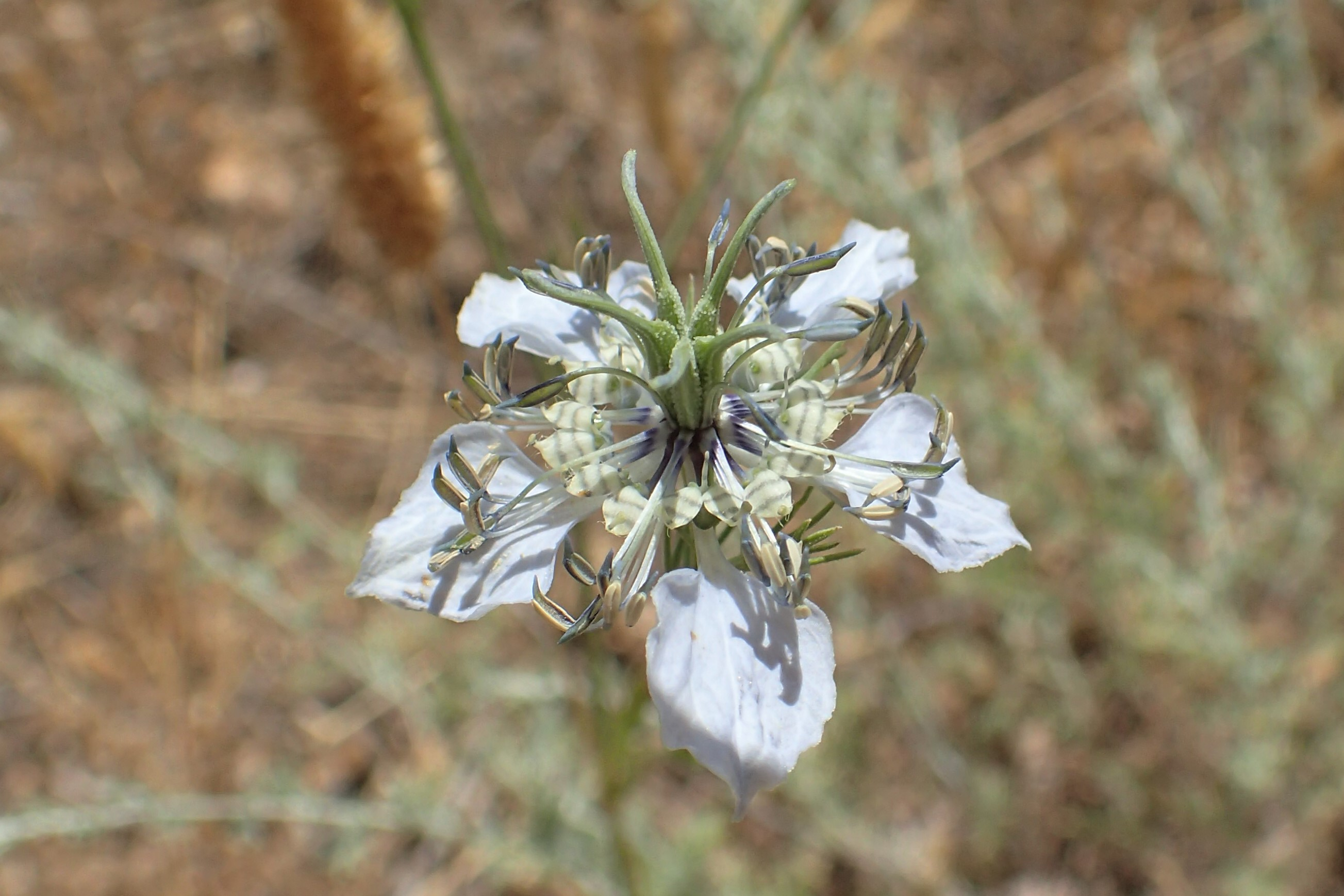
- Close-up of flower
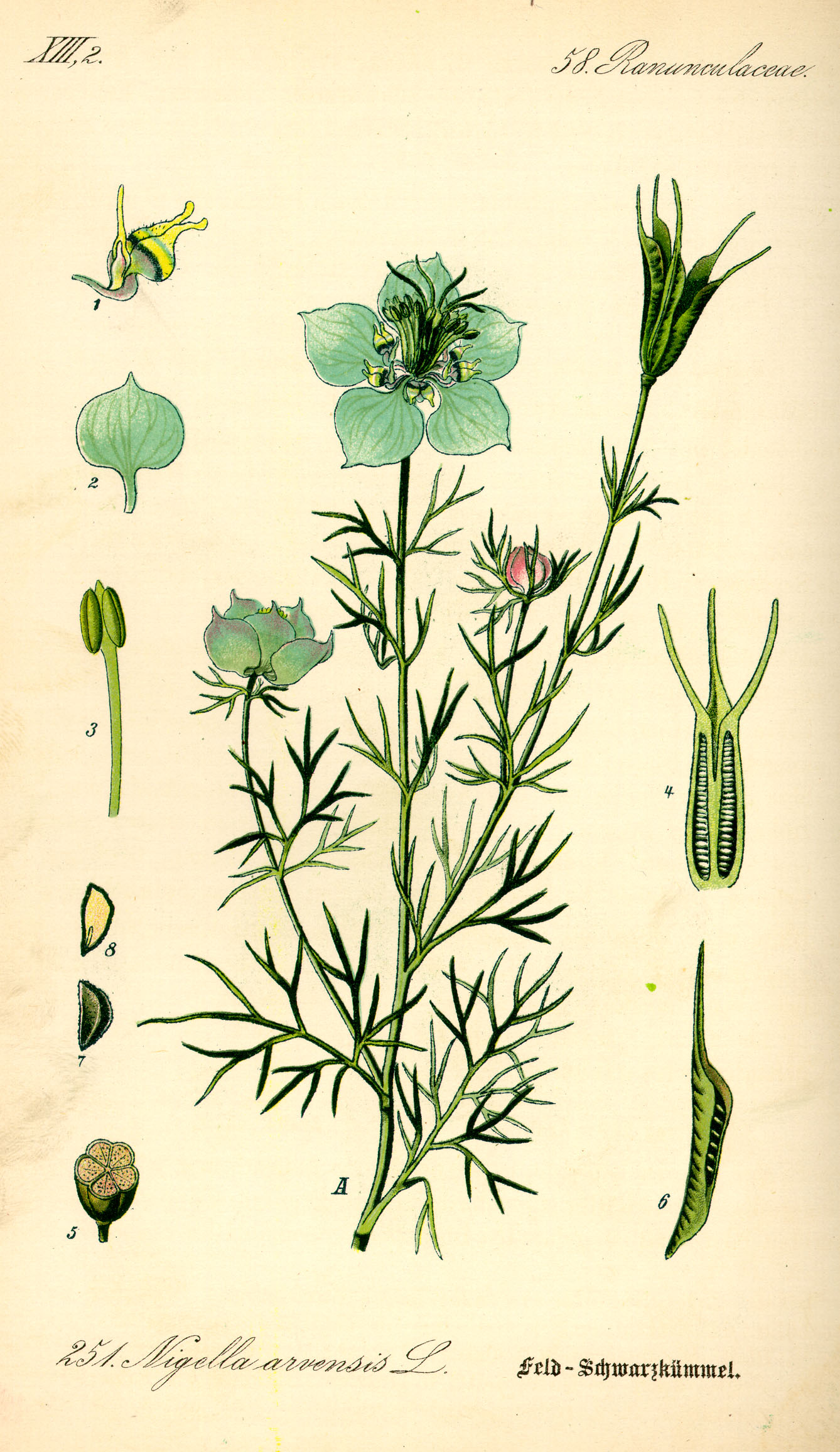
- Botanical illustration

Scientific classification
- Kingdom: Plantae
- Clade: Tracheophytes
- Clade: Angiosperms
- Clade: Eudicots
- Order: Ranunculales
- Family: Ranunculaceae
- Genus: Nigella
- Species: N. arvensis

Binomial name
- Nigella arvensis L.

Synonyms
- List: Nigella agrestis J.Presl & C.Presl; Nigella aspera K.Koch; Nigella doliata Pall. ex M.Bieb.; Nigella foeniculacea DC.; Nigella glauca Wallr.; Nigella laevis Delile ex DC.; Nigella latifolia Mill.; Nigella tenuiflora Gilib.; Nigella tuberculata Griseb.; Nigella tuberculata var. saronensis Zohary; Nigella unguiculata Stokes

= Nigella arvensis =

Species of plant in the genus Nigella

Nigella arvensis, the field nigella or wild fennel flower, is a species of flowering plant in the family Ranunculaceae. It is native to North Africa, central, southern and eastern Europe, the Caucasus region, and the Middle East as far as Iran, and has gone extinct in Switzerland and Crete. It is a minor crop, used locally as a substitute for Nigella sativa, black caraway.

== Subtaxa ==
The following subtaxa are accepted:

- Nigella arvensis var. anatolica Zohary – Turkey
- Nigella arvensis var. iranica Zohary – Iran
- Nigella arvensis subsp. latilabris (Zohary) Greuter & Burdet – Israel
- Nigella arvensis var. longicornis (Zohary) C.C.Towns. – Turkey, Levant, Iraq
- Nigella arvensis subsp. negevensis (Zohary) Greuter & Burdet – Israel
- Nigella arvensis var. oblanceolata P.H.Davis – Turkey
- Nigella arvensis subsp. palaestina (Zohary) Greuter & Burdet – Turkey, Levant
- Nigella arvensis var. simplicifolia Zohary – Iraq

== Gallery ==
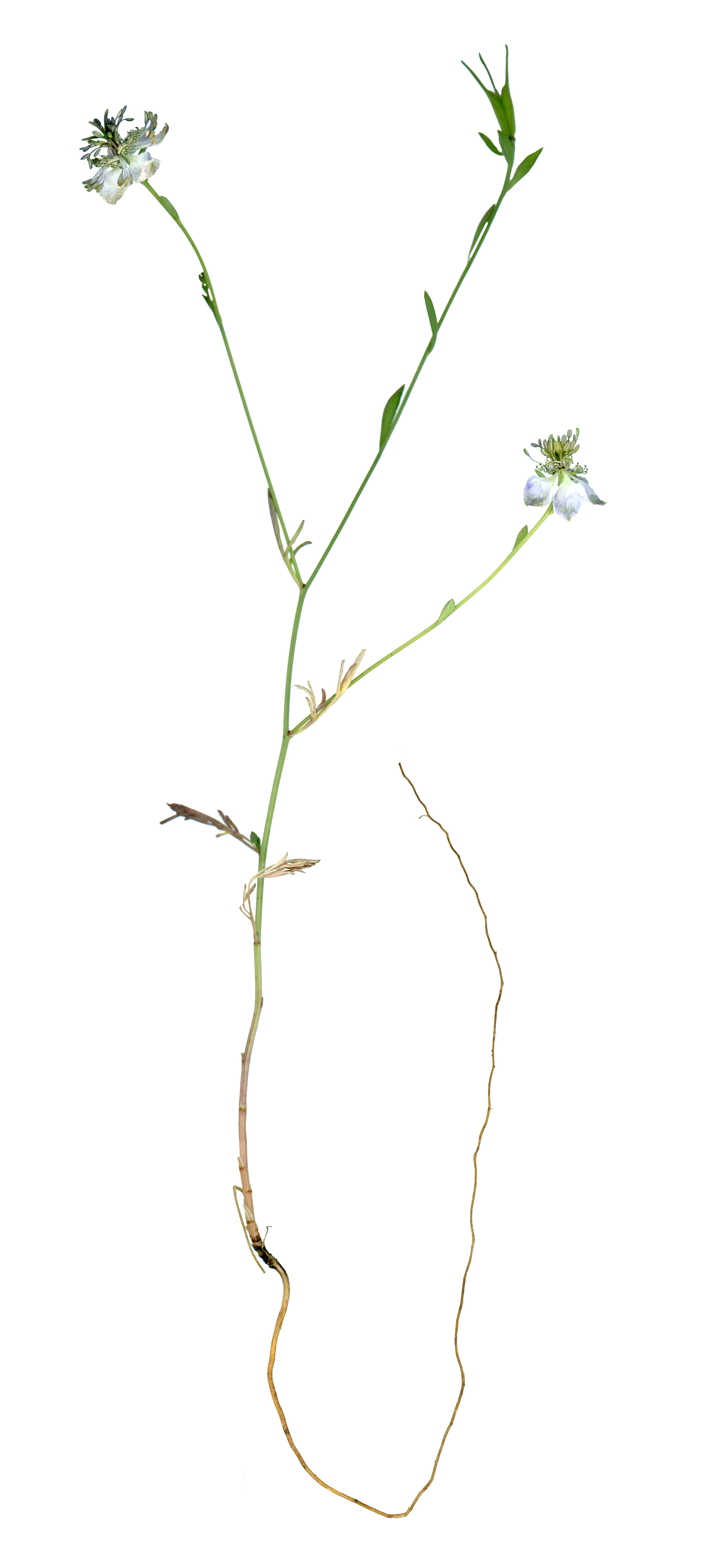
Botanical scan

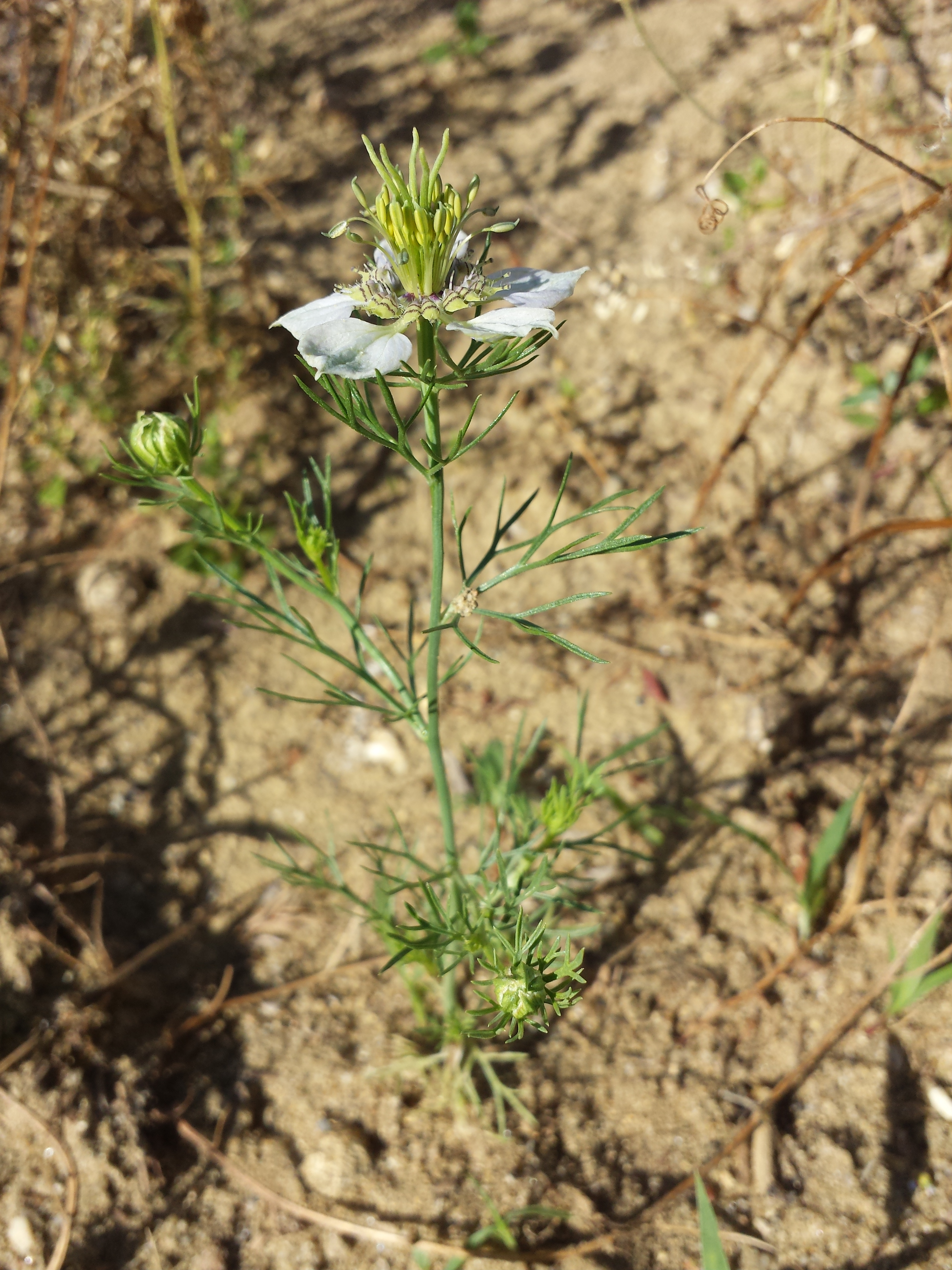
Habit
