= List of native plants of Flora Palaestina (E–O) =

This is an incomplete list of 2,700 species of vascular plants which are native to the region of Palestine as defined by Flora Palaestina. Flora Palaestina is a work in four volumes published by Brill Academic Publishers between 1966 and 1986, edited by Michael Zohary and Naomi Feinbrun-Dothan. The region covered includes the whole area of the State of Israel, the West Bank, the Gaza Strip, the Golan Heights, the Israeli-occupied part of Mount Hermon, and the East Bank (which is in Jordan).

The table below lists alphabetically all species with initial letters E–O. See the following for other species and some background information:

- A–B
- C–D
- P–Z

	Binomial name	Family	Hebrew name	English name	Arabic name	Notes	Image
870	Ecballium elaterium	Cucurbitaceae	ירוקת-חמור מצויה	squirting cucumber			
871	Echinaria capitata	Poaceae	קיפודית הקרקפת				
872	Echinochloa colona	Poaceae	דחנית השלחין	jungle rice			
873	Echinochloa crus-galli	Poaceae	דחנית התרנגולים	cockspur			
874	Echinops adenocaulos	Asteraceae	קיפודן מצוי				
875	Echinops gaillardotii	Asteraceae	קיפודן גיירדו				
876	Echinops glaberrimus	Asteraceae	קיפודן קירח				
877	Echinops philistaeus	Asteraceae	קיפודן פלשתי				
878	Echinops polyceras	Asteraceae	קיפודן בלאנש				
879	Echinops sphaerocephalus	Asteraceae	קיפודן דביק	glandular globe-thistle			
880	Echiochilon fruticosum	Boraginaceae	בר-עכנאי שיחני				
881	Echium angustifolium	Boraginaceae	עכנאי שרוע				
882	Echium glomeratum	Boraginaceae	עכנאי מגובב				
883	Echium judaeum	Boraginaceae	עכנאי יהודה				
884	Echium plantagineum	Boraginaceae	עכנאי נאה	purple viper's-bugloss			
885	Echium rauwolfii	Boraginaceae	עכנאי זיפני				
886	Eclipta prostrata	Asteraceae	אל-ציצית לבנה	false daisy			
887	Ehrharta erecta	Poaceae	ארזית זקופה	panic veldtgrass			
888	Eigia longistyla	Brassicaceae	צלוקית אדום				
889	Elatine alsinastrum	Elatinaceae	אלטין הדורים				
890	Elatine macropoda	Elatinaceae	אלטין עקום-זרעים				
891	Eleocharis palustris	Cyperaceae	בצעוני מצוי				
892	Elymus libanoticus	Poaceae	אלומית הלבנון				
893	Elymus panormitanus	Poaceae	אלומית החורש				
894	Elytrigia elongata	Poaceae	גלדן מוארך				
895	Elytrigia intermedia	Poaceae	גלדן מחוספס				
896	Elytrigia juncea	Poaceae	גלדן סמרני				
897	Emex spinosa	Polygonaceae	אמיך קוצני				
898	Eminium spiculatum	Araceae	לוליינית מעובה				
899	Enarthrocarpus arcuatus	Brassicaceae	מחרוזת קשתית				
900	Enarthrocarpus lyratus	Brassicaceae	מחרוזת כינורית				
901	Enarthrocarpus strangulatus	Brassicaceae	מחרוזת משונצת				
902	Enneapogon desvauxii	Poaceae	ציצן קצר				
903	Enneapogon persicus	Poaceae	ציצן פרסי				
904	Ephedra alata	Ephedraceae	שרביטן מכונף				
905	Ephedra aphylla	Ephedraceae	שרביטן ריסני				
906	Ephedra ciliata	Ephedraceae	שרביטן הערבה				
907	Ephedra foeminea	Ephedraceae	שרביטן מצוי				
908	Ephedra fragilis	Ephedraceae	שרביטן שביר				
909	Ephedra pachyclada	Ephedraceae	שרביטן גס				
910	Epilobium hirsutum	Onagraceae	ערברבה שעירה				
911	Epilobium parviflorum	Onagraceae	ערברבה קטנת-פרחים				
912	Epilobium tetragonum	Onagraceae	ערברבה מרובעת				
913	Epipactis helleborine	Orchidaceae	בן-חורש רחב-עלים				
914	Epipactis veratrifolia	Orchidaceae	בן-חורש גדול				
915	Equisetum ramosissimum	Equisetaceae	שבטבט ענף				
916	Equisetum telmateia	Equisetaceae	שבטבט גדול				
917	Eragrostis barrelieri	Poaceae	בן-חילף נמוך				
918	Eragrostis cilianensis	Poaceae	בן-חילף גדול-שבולית				
919	Eragrostis japonica	Poaceae	בן-חילף מופסק				
920	Eragrostis minor	Poaceae	בן-חילף קטן				
921	Eragrostis pilosa	Poaceae	בן-חילף שעיר				
922	Eragrostis sarmentosa	Poaceae	בן-חילף הביצות				
923	Eragrostis tef	Poaceae	בן-חילף טף				
924	Eragrostis virescens	Poaceae	בן-חילף ירקרק				
925	Eremobium aegyptiacum	Brassicaceae	בת-מדבר מצרית				
926	Eremobium lineare	Brassicaceae	בת-מדבר צרת-עלים				
927	Eremopoa songarica	Poaceae	בת-סיסנית הררית				
928	Eremopyrum bonaepartis	Poaceae	עפרון מפשק				
929	Eremopyrum distans	Poaceae	עפרון מרוחק				
930	Eremostachys laciniata	Lamiaceae	צמר מפוצל				
931	Eremurus spectabilis	Liliaceae	עריר הלבנון				
932	Eriolobus trilobatus	Rosaceae	חוזרר החורש				
933	Erodium acaule	Geraniaceae	מקור-חסידה רומאי				
934	Erodium alnifolium	Geraniaceae	מקור-חסידה חלק				
935	Erodium arborescens	Geraniaceae	מקור-חסידה מעוצה				
936	Erodium botrys	Geraniaceae	מקור-חסידה יפה				
937	Erodium ciconium	Geraniaceae	מקור-חסידה ארוך				
938	Erodium cicutarium	Geraniaceae	מקור-חסידה גזור				
939	Erodium crassifolium	Geraniaceae	מקור-חסידה שעיר				
940	Erodium glaucophyllum	Geraniaceae	מקור-חסידה קירח				
941	Erodium gruinum	Geraniaceae	מקור-חסידה גדול				
942	Erodium laciniatum	Geraniaceae	מקור-חסידה מפוצל				
943	Erodium malacoides	Geraniaceae	מקור-חסידה חלמיתי				
944	Erodium moschatum	Geraniaceae	מקור-חסידה מצוי				
945	Erodium neuradifolium	Geraniaceae	מקור-חסידה מצרי				
946	Erodium oxyrhynchum	Geraniaceae	מקור-חסידה מלבין				
947	Erodium subintegrifolium	Geraniaceae	מקור-חסידה תמים				
948	Erodium telavivense	Geraniaceae	מקור-חסידה תל-אביבי				
949	Erodium touchyanum	Geraniaceae	מקור-חסידה מדברי				
950	Erophila minima	Brassicaceae	אביבית זעירה				
951	Erophila praecox	Brassicaceae	אביבית בינונית				
952	Eruca sativa	Brassicaceae	בן-חרדל מצוי				
953	Erucaria hispanica	Brassicaceae	שלח ספרדי				
954	Erucaria microcarpa	Brassicaceae	בן-שלח מנוצה				
955	Erucaria pinnata	Brassicaceae	שלח מאונקל				
956	Erucaria rostrata	Brassicaceae	שלח הערבות				
957	Eryngium barrelieri	Apiaceae	חרחבינה טובענית		قرصعنة برميلية		
958	Eryngium billardierei	Apiaceae	חרחבינה חרמונית		قرصعنة بيلارديري		
959	Eryngium bourgatii	Apiaceae	חרחבינה ירוקה		قرصعنة بورغاتي		
960	Eryngium creticum	Apiaceae	חרחבינה מכחילה		قرصعنة كريتية		
961	Eryngium falcatum	Apiaceae	חרחבינה חרמשית		قرصعنة منجلية		
962	Eryngium glomeratum	Apiaceae	חרחבינה מגובבת		قرصعنة متكتلة		
963	Eryngium maritimum	Apiaceae	חרחבינה חופית		قرصعنة بحرية		
964	Erysimum crassipes	Brassicaceae	אריסימון תמים				
965	Erysimum goniocaulon	Brassicaceae	אריסימון מצולע				
966	Erysimum purpureum	Brassicaceae	אריסימון ארגמני				
967	Erysimum repandum	Brassicaceae	אריסימון גלוני				
968	Erysimum scabrum	Brassicaceae	אריסימון מחוספס				
969	Erysimum smyrnaeum	Brassicaceae	אריסימון איזמירי				
970	Erysimum verrucosum	Brassicaceae	אריסימון מיובל				
971	Eupatorium cannabinum	Asteraceae	גדותן הביצות				
972	Euphorbia aleppica	Euphorbiaceae	חלבלוב ארם-צובא				
973	Euphorbia antilibanotica	Euphorbiaceae	חלבלוב מול-הלבנון				
974	Euphorbia apios	Euphorbiaceae	חלבלוב אפיוס				
975	Euphorbia arguta	Euphorbiaceae	חלבלוב משונשן				
976	Euphorbia aulacosperma	Euphorbiaceae	חלבלוב מחורץ				
977	Euphorbia berythea	Euphorbiaceae	חלבלוב בירותי				
978	Euphorbia chamaepeplus	Euphorbiaceae	חלבלוב פעוט				
979	Euphorbia chamaesyce	Euphorbiaceae	חלבלוב עגול-עלים				
980	Euphorbia dendroides	Euphorbiaceae	חלבלוב השיח				
981	Euphorbia erinacea	Euphorbiaceae	חלבלוב קוצני				
982	Euphorbia exigua	Euphorbiaceae	חלבלוב צר-עלים				
983	Euphorbia falcata	Euphorbiaceae	חלבלוב מגלי				
984	Euphorbia forskalii	Euphorbiaceae	חלבלוב מצרי				
985	Euphorbia granulata	Euphorbiaceae	חלבלוב מגורגר				
986	Euphorbia grossheimii	Euphorbiaceae	חלבלוב סיני				
987	Euphorbia helioscopia	Euphorbiaceae	חלבלוב השמש				
988	Euphorbia hierosolymitana	Euphorbiaceae	חלבלוב מגובשש				
989	Euphorbia hirsuta	Euphorbiaceae	חלבלוב שעיר				
990	Euphorbia macroclada	Euphorbiaceae	חלבלוב ענף				
991	Euphorbia microsphaera	Euphorbiaceae	חלבלוב קטן-פרי				
992	Euphorbia oblongata	Euphorbiaceae	חלבלוב מוארך				
993	Euphorbia oxyodonta	Euphorbiaceae	חלבלוב מרושת				
994	Euphorbia paralias	Euphorbiaceae	חלבלוב הים				
995	Euphorbia peplis	Euphorbiaceae	חלבלוב שרוע				
996	Euphorbia peplus	Euphorbiaceae	חלבלוב מצוי				
997	Euphorbia petiolata	Euphorbiaceae	חלבלוב צמיר				
998	Euphorbia phymatosperma	Euphorbiaceae	חלבלוב עב-זרע				
999	Euphorbia ramanensis	Euphorbiaceae	חלבלוב רמון				
1000	Euphorbia retusa	Euphorbiaceae	חלבלוב קהירי				
1001	Euphorbia reuteriana	Euphorbiaceae	חלבלוב מקרין				
1002	Euphorbia terracina	Euphorbiaceae	חלבלוב החוף				
1003	Euphorbia valerianifolia	Euphorbiaceae	חלבלוב סמור				
1004	Exoacantha heterophylla	Apiaceae	צנינה קוצנית				
1005	Factorovskya aschersoniana	Papilionaceae	פקטורובסקיית אשרסון				
1006	Fagonia arabica	Zygophyllaceae	פגוניה ערבית				
1007	Fagonia bruguierei	Zygophyllaceae	פגוניה קטנת-פרחים				
1008	Fagonia glutinosa	Zygophyllaceae	פגוניה דביקה				
1009	Fagonia mollis	Zygophyllaceae	פגוניה רכה				
1010	Fagonia scabra	Zygophyllaceae	פגוניית סיני				
1011	Fagonia tenuifolia	Zygophyllaceae	פגוניה צרת-עלים				
1012	Faidherbia albida	Mimosaceae	שיטה מלבינה				
1013	Falcaria vulgaris	Apiaceae	חרמשית השדות				
1014	Farsetia aegyptia	Brassicaceae	פרסטיה מצרית				
1015	Ferula biverticillata	Apiaceae	כלך דו-דורי				
1016	Ferula communis	Apiaceae	כלך מצוי				
1017	Ferula daninii	Apiaceae	כלך דנין				
1018	Ferula hermonis	Apiaceae	כלך חרמוני				
1019	Ferula negevensis	Apiaceae	כלך נגבי				
1020	Ferula orientalis	Apiaceae	כלך שומרוני				
1021	Ferula sinaica	Apiaceae	כלך סיני				
1022	Ferula tingitana	Apiaceae	כלך מרוקני				
1023	Ferulago syriaca	Apiaceae	כלכלך סורי				
1024	Ferulago trachycarpa	Apiaceae	כלכלך שעיר-פרי				
1025	Fibigia clypeata	Brassicaceae	משקפיים מצויים				
1026	Fibigia eriocarpa	Brassicaceae	משקפיים שעירים				
1027	Fibigia obovata	Brassicaceae	משקפיים חרמוניים				
1028	Ficus carica	Moraceae	פיקוס התאנה				
1029	Ficus palmata	Moraceae	פיקוס בת-שקמה				
1030	Ficus sycomorus	Moraceae	פיקוס השקמה				
1031	Filago anatolica	Asteraceae	פילגון אנטולי				
1032	Filago argentea	Asteraceae	פילגון מכסיף				
1033	Filago contracta	Asteraceae	פילגון קפוץ				
1034	Filago desertorum	Asteraceae	פילגון מדברי				
1035	Filago eriocephala	Asteraceae	פילגון צמיר				
1036	Filago inexpectata	Asteraceae	פילגון מפתיע				
1037	Filago palaestina	Asteraceae	פילגון ארץ-ישראלי				
1038	Filago pyramidata	Asteraceae	פילגון מצוי				
1039	Fimbristylis bisumbellata	Cyperaceae	עליעב מדוקרן				
1040	Fimbristylis ferruginea	Cyperaceae	עליעב חלוד				
1041	Foeniculum vulgare	Apiaceae	שומר פשוט				
1042	Forsskaolea tenacissima	Urticaceae	פורסקלאה שבירה				
1043	Frankenia hirsuta	Frankeniaceae	פרנקניה שעירה				
1044	Frankenia pulverulenta	Frankeniaceae	פרנקניה מאובקת				
1045	Fraxinus syriaca	Oleaceae	מילה סורית				
1046	Fritillaria crassifolia	Liliaceae	גביעונית עבת-עלים				
1047	Fritillaria persica	Liliaceae	גביעונית הלבנון				
1048	Fuirena pubescens	Cyperaceae	פואירנה שעירה				
1049	Fumana arabica	Cistaceae	לוטמית ערבית				
1050	Fumana thymifolia	Cistaceae	לוטמית דביקה				
1051	Fumaria asepala	Fumariaceae	עשנן חשוף				
1052	Fumaria capreolata	Fumariaceae	עשנן מטפס				
1053	Fumaria densiflora	Fumariaceae	עשנן צפוף				
1054	Fumaria judaica	Fumariaceae	עשנן יהודה				
1055	Fumaria kralikii	Fumariaceae	עשנן קראליק				
1056	Fumaria macrocarpa	Fumariaceae	עשנן גדול-פרי				
1057	Fumaria parviflora	Fumariaceae	עשנן קטן				
1058	Fumaria petteri	Fumariaceae	עשנן הגליל				
1059	Gagea bohemica	Liliaceae	זהבית פעוטה				
1060	Gagea chlorantha	Liliaceae	זהבית דמשקאית				
1061	Gagea commutata	Liliaceae	זהבית השלוחות				
1062	Gagea dayana	Liliaceae	זהבית שרונית				
1063	Gagea fibrosa	Liliaceae	זהבית אשונה				
1064	Gagea fistulosa	Liliaceae	זהבית נבובה				
1065	Gagea libanotica	Liliaceae	זהבית אדמדמת				
1066	Gagea micrantha	Liliaceae	זהבית קטנת-פרחים				
1067	Gagea reticulata	Liliaceae	זהבית דקת-עלים				
1068	Gagea villosa	Liliaceae	זהבית שעירה				
1069	Galium aparine	Rubiaceae	דבקה זיפנית				
1070	Galium bracteatum	Rubiaceae	דבקת החפים				
1071	Galium canum	Rubiaceae	דבקה אפורה				
1072	Galium cassium	Rubiaceae	דבקה סורית				
1073	Galium chaetopodum	Rubiaceae	דבקה זנובה				
1074	Galium divaricatum	Rubiaceae	דבקה מפושקת				
1075	Galium elongatum	Rubiaceae	דבקת הירדן				
1076	Galium ghilanicum	Rubiaceae	דבקת גילן				
1077	Galium hierochuntinum	Rubiaceae	דבקת יריחו				
1078	Galium hierosolymitanum	Rubiaceae	דבקת ירושלים				
1079	Galium humifusum	Rubiaceae	דבקה שרועה				
1080	Galium incanum	Rubiaceae	דבקה משחירה				
1081	Galium judaicum	Rubiaceae	דבקת יהודה				
1082	Galium libanoticum	Rubiaceae	דבקת הלבנון				
1083	Galium murale	Rubiaceae	דבקת החומות				
1084	Galium philistaeum	Rubiaceae	דבקת פלשת				
1085	Galium pisiferum	Rubiaceae	דבקת האפונים				
1086	Galium rivale	Rubiaceae	דבקת הנחלים				
1087	Galium samuelssonii	Rubiaceae	דבקת סמואלסון				
1088	Galium setaceum	Rubiaceae	דבקה דקיקה				
1089	Galium spurium	Rubiaceae	דבקה עדינה				
1090	Galium tricornutum	Rubiaceae	דבקה משלשת				
1091	Galium verrucosum	Rubiaceae	דבקת הפטמות				
1092	Galium verticillatum	Rubiaceae	דבקת הדורים				
1093	Galium verum	Rubiaceae	דבקה אמתית				
1094	Garhadiolus angulosus	Asteraceae	גרדיולוס מדברי				
1095	Garidella nigellastrum	Ranunculaceae	קצח זעיר-פרחים				
1096	Garidella unguicularis	Ranunculaceae	קצח הציפורן				
1097	Gastridium phleoides	Poaceae	כרסתן איטני				
1098	Gastridium scabrum	Poaceae	כרסתן מחוספס				
1099	Gastridium ventricosum	Poaceae	כרסתן נפוח				
1100	Gastrocotyle hispida	Boraginaceae	בטנונית שעירה				
1101	Gaudinia fragilis	Poaceae	גודיניה שבירה				
1102	Genista fasselata	Papilionaceae	רתמה קוצנית				
1103	Genista libanotica	Papilionaceae	רתמת הלבנון				
1104	Geranium columbinum	Geraniaceae	גרניון נאה				
1105	Geranium dissectum	Geraniaceae	גרניון גזור				
1106	Geranium libani	Geraniaceae	גרניון הלבנון				
1107	Geranium libanoticum	Geraniaceae	גרניון הררי				
1108	Geranium lucidum	Geraniaceae	גרניון נוצץ				
1109	Geranium molle	Geraniaceae	גרניון רך				
1110	Geranium robertianum	Geraniaceae	גרניון הארגמן				
1111	Geranium rotundifolium	Geraniaceae	גרניון עגול				
1112	Geranium tuberosum	Geraniaceae	גרניון הפקעות				
1113	Geropogon hybridus	Asteraceae	זקן-סב מצוי				
1114	Geum urbanum	Rosaceae	גיאון				
1115	Gladiolus atroviolaceus	Iridaceae	סייפן סגול				
1116	Gladiolus italicus	Iridaceae	סייפן התבואה				
1117	Glaucium aleppicum	Papaveraceae	פרגת ארם-צובא				
1118	Glaucium arabicum	Papaveraceae	פרגה ערבית				
1119	Glaucium corniculatum	Papaveraceae	פרגה מקרינה				
1120	Glaucium flavum	Papaveraceae	פרגה צהובה				
1121	Glaucium grandiflorum	Papaveraceae	פרגה אדומה				
1122	Glaucium leiocarpum	Papaveraceae	פרגה קירחת				
1123	Glinus lotoides	Molluginaceae	אפרורית מצויה				
1124	Globularia arabica	Globulariaceae	גולנית ערב				
1125	Glossonema boveanum	Asclepiadaceae	לשנן בובה				
1126	Glyceria notata	Poaceae	מתקה טובענית				
1127	Glycyrrhiza echinata	Papilionaceae	שוש קוצני				
1128	Glycyrrhiza glabra	Papilionaceae	שוש קירח				
1129	Gomphocarpus sinaicus	Asclepiadaceae	מסמור סיני				
1130	Gonocytisus pterocladus	Papilionaceae	צלען הגליל				
1131	Grewia villosa	Tiliaceae	גרויה שעירה				
1132	Groenlandia densa	Potamogetonaceae	ברכנית צפופה				
1133	Gundelia tournefortii	Asteraceae	עכובית הגלגל		عـكوب		
1134	Gymnarrhena micrantha	Asteraceae	מוצנית קטנת-פרחים				
1135	Gymnocarpos decander	Caryophyllaceae	ערטל מדברי				
1136	Gypsophila capillaris	Caryophyllaceae	גבסנית ערבית				
1137	Gypsophila pilosa	Caryophyllaceae	גבסנית שעירה				
1138	Gypsophila viscosa	Caryophyllaceae	גבסנית דביקה				
1139	Halocnemum strobilaceum	Chenopodiaceae	סווד אצטרובלי				
1140	Halodule uninervis	Cymodoceaceae	ימית חד-עורקית				
1141	Halopeplis amplexicaulis	Chenopodiaceae	הלופפליס חובק				
1142	Halophila ovalis	Hydrocharitaceae	ימון ביצני				
1143	Halophila stipulacea	Hydrocharitaceae	ימון הקשקשים				
1144	Halothamnus hierochunticus	Chenopodiaceae	אלניה נאה				
1145	Halothamnus lancifolius	Chenopodiaceae	אלניה אזמלנית				
1146	Haloxylon eigii	Chenopodiaceae	חמד איג				
1147	Haloxylon negevensis	Chenopodiaceae	חמד הנגב				
1148	Haloxylon persicum	Chenopodiaceae	עציון פרסי				
1149	Haloxylon salicornicum	Chenopodiaceae	חמד השיח				
1150	Haloxylon scoparium	Chenopodiaceae	חמד המדבר				
1151	Haplophyllum buxbaumii	Rutaceae	פיגמית מצויה				
1152	Haplophyllum poorei	Rutaceae	פיגמית הסלע				
1153	Haplophyllum tuberculatum	Rutaceae	פיגמית מגובששת				
1154	Hedera helix	Araliaceae	קיסוס החורש				
1155	Hedypnois rhagadioloides	Asteraceae	שופרית כרתית				
1156	Hedysarum spinosissimum	Papilionaceae	משנצת קוצנית				
1157	Helianthemum aegyptiacum	Cistaceae	שמשון מצרי				
1158	Helianthemum kahiricum	Cistaceae	שמשון קהירי				
1159	Helianthemum lasiocarpum	Cistaceae	שמשון שעיר				
1160	Helianthemum ledifolium	Cistaceae	שמשון ריסני				
1161	Helianthemum lippii	Cistaceae	שמשון ליפי				
1162	Helianthemum salicifolium	Cistaceae	שמשון מצוי				
1163	Helianthemum sancti-antonii	Cistaceae	שמשון המדבר				
1164	Helianthemum sessiliflorum	Cistaceae	שמשון יושב				
1165	Helianthemum stipulatum	Cistaceae	שמשון סגלגל				
1166	Helianthemum syriacum	Cistaceae	שמשון אזוביוני				
1167	Helianthemum ventosum	Cistaceae	שמשון הנגב				
1168	Helianthemum vesicarium	Cistaceae	שמשון הדור				
1169	Helichrysum pallasii	Asteraceae	דם-המכבים ההררי				
1170	Helichrysum sanguineum	Asteraceae	דם-המכבים האדום				
1171	Heliotropium arbainense	Boraginaceae	עוקץ-עקרב מדברי				
1172	Heliotropium bacciferum	Boraginaceae	עוקץ-עקרב גלוני				
1173	Heliotropium bovei	Boraginaceae	עוקץ-עקרב אפור				
1174	Heliotropium digynum	Boraginaceae	עוקץ-עקרב צהוב				
1175	Heliotropium europaeum	Boraginaceae	עוקץ-עקרב אירופי				
1176	Heliotropium hirsutissimum	Boraginaceae	עוקץ-עקרב שעיר				
1177	Heliotropium lasiocarpum	Boraginaceae	עוקץ-עקרב שעיר-פרי				
1178	Heliotropium maris-mortui	Boraginaceae	עוקץ-עקרב ים-מלחי				
1179	Heliotropium myosotoides	Boraginaceae	עוקץ-עקרב ארם-צובא				
1180	Heliotropium rotundifolium	Boraginaceae	עוקץ-עקרב עגול-עלים				
1181	Heliotropium suaveolens	Boraginaceae	עוקץ-עקרב ריחני				
1182	Heliotropium supinum	Boraginaceae	עוקץ-עקרב שרוע				
1183	Helminthotheca echioides	Asteraceae	תולענית דוקרנית				
1184	Hemarthria altissima	Poaceae	ישרוע מאוגד				
1185	Heptaptera anisoptera	Apiaceae	כנפה חרוקה				
1186	Heracleum humile	Apiaceae	הרקליאון נמוך				
1187	Herniaria glabra	Caryophyllaceae	דרכנית קירחת				
1188	Herniaria hemistemon	Caryophyllaceae	דרכנית מקופחת				
1189	Herniaria hirsuta	Caryophyllaceae	דרכנית שעירה				
1190	Herniaria incana	Caryophyllaceae	דרכנית אפורה				
1191	Hesperis pendula	Brassicaceae	מעריב משתלשל				
1192	Heteranthelium piliferum	Poaceae	עקר שעיר				
1193	Heterocaryum subsessile	Boraginaceae	שניין קטן				
1194	Heterocaryum szovitsianum	Boraginaceae	שניין שכני				
1195	Hibiscus micranthus	Malvaceae	היביסקוס סגלגל				
1196	Hibiscus trionum	Malvaceae	היביסקוס משולש				
1197	Himantoglossum caprinum	Orchidaceae	רצועית הגליל				
1198	Hippocrepis areolata	Papilionaceae	פרסה מקרינה				
1199	Hippocrepis constricta	Papilionaceae	פרסה משונצת				
1200	Hippocrepis multisiliquosa	Papilionaceae	פרסה רבת-תרמילים				
1201	Hippocrepis unisiliquosa	Papilionaceae	פרסה דלת-תרמילים				
1202	Hirschfeldia incana	Brassicaceae	לפתית מצויה				
1203	Holcus annuus	Poaceae	עדן חד-שנתי				
1204	Holosteum glutinosum	Caryophyllaceae	סכיכון דביק				
1205	Holosteum umbellatum	Caryophyllaceae	סכיכון משונן				
1206	Hordeum bulbosum	Poaceae	שעורת הבולבוסין		شعير بصيلي		
1207	Hordeum geniculatum	Poaceae	שעורה נימית				
1208	Hordeum glaucum	Poaceae	שעורת העכבר				
1209	Hordeum marinum	Poaceae	שעורת החוף				
1210	Hordeum secalinum	Poaceae	שעורת השיפון				
1211	Hordeum spontaneum	Poaceae	שעורת התבור				
1212	Hormuzakia aggregata	Boraginaceae	לשון-שור מגובבת				
1213	Hormuzakia negevensis	Boraginaceae	לשון-שור נגבית				
1214	Hueblia calycina	Scrophulariaceae	פומה פרסית				
1215	Hyacinthella nervosa	Liliaceae	יקינטונית מעורקת				
1216	Hyacinthus orientalis	Liliaceae	יקינטון מזרחי				
1217	Hydrocharis morsus-ranae	Hydrocharitaceae	מימון הצפרדעים				
1218	Hydrocotyle ranunculoides	Apiaceae	ספלילה מצויה				
1219	Hydrocotyle sibthorpioides	Apiaceae	ספלילה זעירה				
1220	Hydrocotyle vulgaris	Apiaceae	ספלילה טבורית				
1221	Hymenocarpos circinnatus	Papilionaceae	כליינית מצויה				
1222	Hymenolobus procumbens	Brassicaceae	ילקוטון שרוע				
1223	Hyoscyamus albus	Solanaceae	שיכרון לבן				
1224	Hyoscyamus aureus	Solanaceae	שיכרון זהוב				
1225	Hyoscyamus boveanus	Solanaceae	שיכרון סיני				
1226	Hyoscyamus desertorum	Solanaceae	שיכרון מדברי				
1227	Hyoscyamus muticus	Solanaceae	שיכרון קהה				
1228	Hyoscyamus pusillus	Solanaceae	שיכרון פעוט				
1229	Hyoscyamus reticulatus	Solanaceae	שיכרון מרושת				
1230	Hyoseris scabra	Asteraceae	חזרזרת מחוספסת				
1231	Hyparrhenia hirta	Poaceae	זקנן שעיר				
1232	Hypecoum aegyptiacum	Papaveraceae	מגלית מצרית				
1233	Hypecoum dimidiatum	Papaveraceae	מגלית גדולת-פרחים				
1234	Hypecoum littorale	Papaveraceae	מגלית הדרום				
1235	Hypecoum pendulum	Papaveraceae	מגלית משתלשלת				
1236	Hypecoum procumbens	Papaveraceae	מגלית שרועה				
1237	Hypericum amblysepalum	Hypericaceae	פרע אזובי				
1238	Hypericum hircinum	Hypericaceae	פרע ריחני				
1239	Hypericum lanuginosum	Hypericaceae	פרע צמיר				
1240	Hypericum libanoticum	Hypericaceae	פרע לבנוני				
1241	Hypericum nanum	Hypericaceae	פרע ננסי				
1242	Hypericum tetrapterum (as Hypericum quadrangulum)	Hypericaceae	פרע מחודד				
1243	Hypericum scabrum	Hypericaceae	פרע מחוספס				
1244	Hypericum sinaicum	Hypericaceae	פרע סיני				
1245	Hypericum thymifolium	Hypericaceae	פרע קטן-עלים				
1246	Hypericum triquetrifolium	Hypericaceae	פרע מסולסל				
1247	Hyphaene thebaica	Palmae	דום מצרי				
1248	Hypochaeris achyrophorus	Asteraceae	היפוכריס נדיר				
1249	Hypochaeris glabra	Asteraceae	היפוכריס קירח				
1250	Iberis odorata	Brassicaceae	דו-כנף ריחנית				
1251	Ifloga rueppellii	Asteraceae	מחטנית המדבר				
1252	Ifloga spicata	Asteraceae	מחטנית משובלת				
1253	Imperata cylindrica	Poaceae	משיין גליליני				
1254	Indigofera articulata	Papilionaceae	ניל מכסיף				
1255	Indigofera oblongifolia	Papilionaceae	ניל דל-עלים				
1256	Iphiona maris-mortui	Asteraceae	אפיונת ים-המלח				
1257	Iphiona mucronata	Asteraceae	אפיונה מחודדת				
1258	Iphiona scabra	Asteraceae	אפיונה מחוספסת				
1259	Ipomoea cairica	Convolvulaceae	לפופית כפנית				
1260	Ipomoea hederacea	Convolvulaceae	לפופית הקיסוס				
1261	Ipomoea imperati	Convolvulaceae	לפופית החוף				
1262	Ipomoea sagittata	Convolvulaceae	לפופית החיצים				
1263	Ipomoea triloba	Convolvulaceae	לפופית משולשת				
1264	Iris atrofusca	Iridaceae	אירוס שחום				
1265	Iris atropurpurea	Iridaceae	אירוס הארגמן				
1266	Iris bismarckiana	Iridaceae	אירוס נצרתי				
1267	Iris edomensis	Iridaceae	אירוס אדומי				
1268	Iris grant-duffii	Iridaceae	אירוס הביצות				
1269	Iris haynei	Iridaceae	אירוס הגלבוע		سوسن فقوعة		
1270	Iris hermona	Iridaceae	אירוס החרמון				
1271	Iris histrio	Iridaceae	אירוס הלבנון				
1272	Iris lortetii	Iridaceae	אירוס הדור	Samarian Iris			
1273	Iris mariae	Iridaceae	אירוס הנגב				
1274	Iris mesopotamica	Iridaceae	אירוס ארם-נהריים				
1275	Iris palaestina	Iridaceae	אירוס ארץ-ישראלי	Palaestine Iris			
1276	Iris petrana	Iridaceae	אירוס ירוחם				
1277	Iris pseudacorus	Iridaceae	אירוס ענף				
1278	Iris regis-uzziae	Iridaceae	אירוס טוביה	King Uzziae Iris			
1279	Iris vartanii	Iridaceae	אירוס הסרגל				
1280	Isatis lusitanica	Brassicaceae	איסטיס מצוי				
1281	Isatis microcarpa	Brassicaceae	איסטיס קטן-פרי				
1282	Ixiolirion tataricum	Amaryllidaceae	כחלית ההרים				
1283	Jasminum fruticans	Oleaceae	יסמין שיחני				
1284	Johrenia dichotoma	Apiaceae	יורניה דו-קרנית				
1285	Juncus acutus	Juncaceae	סמר חד		أسل شائك		
1286	Juncus articulatus	Juncaceae	סמר הפרקים		أسل متفرع		
1287	Juncus bufonius	Juncaceae	סמר מצוי		أسل ضفدعي		
1288	Juncus capitatus	Juncaceae	סמר קרקפתי		أسل رأسي		
1289	Juncus fontanesii	Juncaceae	סמר מחויץ				
1290	Juncus inflexus	Juncaceae	סמר אפרפר				
1291	Juncus maritimus	Juncaceae	סמר ימי		أسل بحري		
1292	Juncus punctorius	Juncaceae	סמר המכבד				
1293	Juncus rigidus	Juncaceae	סמר ערבי		أسل خشن		
1294	Juncus sphaerocarpus	Juncaceae	סמר ענף				
1295	Juncus subulatus	Juncaceae	סמר מרצעני				
1296	Juniperus drupacea	Cupressaceae	ערער גלעיני				
1297	Juniperus excelsa	Cupressaceae	ערער ברושי				
1298	Juniperus oxycedrus	Cupressaceae	ערער ארזי				
1299	Juniperus phoenicea	Cupressaceae	ערער אדום				
1300	Jurinea staehelinae	Asteraceae	יורינאה טרשית				
1301	Kickxia acerbiana	Scrophulariaceae	עפעפית אשונה				
1302	Kickxia aegyptiaca	Scrophulariaceae	עפעפית מצרית				
1303	Kickxia cirrhosa	Scrophulariaceae	עפעפית הקנוקנות				
1304	Kickxia elatine	Scrophulariaceae	עפעפית שרועה				
1305	Kickxia floribunda	Scrophulariaceae	עפעפית רבת-פרחים				
1306	Kickxia judaica	Scrophulariaceae	עפעפית יהודה				
1307	Kickxia lanigera	Scrophulariaceae	עפעפית צמירה				
1308	Kickxia macilenta	Scrophulariaceae	עפעפית סיני				
1309	Kickxia petrana	Scrophulariaceae	עפעפית אדומית				
1310	Kickxia spartioides	Scrophulariaceae	עפעפית גדולת-פרחים				
1311	Kickxia spuria	Scrophulariaceae	עפעפית עגולת-עלים				
1312	Kitaibelia balansae	Malvaceae	עוגית חרמונית				
1313	Knautia integrifolia	Dipsacaceae	חוגית תמימה				
1314	Koelpinia linearis	Asteraceae	מסורן סרגלני				
1315	Lachnophyllum noaeanum	Asteraceae	דוגון ירושלמי				
1316	Lactuca aculeata	Asteraceae	חסה שיכנית				
1317	Lactuca orientalis	Asteraceae	חסה מזרחית				
1318	Lactuca saligna	Asteraceae	חסה רותמית				
1319	Lactuca serriola	Asteraceae	חסת המצפן				
1320	Lactuca tuberosa	Asteraceae	חסה כחולת-פרחים				
1321	Lactuca undulata	Asteraceae	חסה גלונית				
1322	Lactuca viminea	Asteraceae	חסת השבטים				
1323	Lagoecia cuminoides	Apiaceae	נוצנית כדורית				
1324	Lagurus ovatus	Poaceae	זנב-ארנבת ביצני				
1325	Lallemantia iberica	Lamiaceae	מניפנית גרוזית				
1326	Lamarckia aurea	Poaceae	משערת זהובה				
1327	Lamium amplexicaule	Lamiaceae	נזמית לופתת				
1328	Lamium garganicum	Lamiaceae	נזמית מקווקוות				
1329	Lamium moschatum	Lamiaceae	נזמית לבנה				
1330	Lamium truncatum	Lamiaceae	נזמית קטועה				
1331	Lappula sinaica	Boraginaceae	לפית סיני				
1332	Lappula spinocarpos	Boraginaceae	לפית שיכנית				
1333	Lapsana pisidica	Asteraceae	לפסנה ענפה				
1334	Lasiopogon muscoides	Asteraceae	בן-ציצית טחבני				
1335	Lasiospermum brachyglossum	Asteraceae	זרעזיף המדבר				
1336	Lasiurus scindicus	Poaceae	מצמרת שעירה				
1337	Lathyrus annuus	Papilionaceae	טופח חד-שנתי				
1338	Lathyrus aphaca	Papilionaceae	טופח מצוי				
1339	Lathyrus blepharicarpos	Papilionaceae	טופח ריסני				
1340	Lathyrus cassius	Papilionaceae	טופח קסיוס				
1341	Lathyrus ciliolatus	Papilionaceae	טופח השלוחות				
1342	Lathyrus gloeospermus	Papilionaceae	טופח דביק				
1343	Lathyrus golanensis	Papilionaceae	טופח הגולן				
1344	Lathyrus gorgonei	Papilionaceae	טופח ארך-עמוד				
1345	Lathyrus hierosolymitanus	Papilionaceae	טופח ירושלים				
1346	Lathyrus hirsutus	Papilionaceae	טופח שעיר				
1347	Lathyrus hirticarpus	Papilionaceae	טופח שעיר-פרי				
1348	Lathyrus inconspicuus	Papilionaceae	טופח זקוף				
1349	Lathyrus lentiformis	Papilionaceae	טופח עדשתי				
1350	Lathyrus marmoratus	Papilionaceae	טופח נאה				
1351	Lathyrus nissolia	Papilionaceae	טופח עדין				
1352	Lathyrus ochrus	Papilionaceae	טופח גדול				
1353	Lathyrus palustris	Papilionaceae	טופח הביצות				
1354	Lathyrus plitmannii	Papilionaceae	טופח חד-עורקי				
1355	Lathyrus pseudocicera	Papilionaceae	טופח אדום				
1356	Lathyrus roseus	Papilionaceae	טופח החרמון				
1357	Lathyrus setifolius	Papilionaceae	טופח חכלילי				
1358	Lathyrus spathulatus	Papilionaceae	טופח הגליל				
1359	Lathyrus sphaericus	Papilionaceae	טופח כדורי				
1360	Launaea angustifolia	Asteraceae	לוניאה צרת-עלים				
1361	Launaea capitata	Asteraceae	לוניאה מגובבת				
1362	Launaea fragilis	Asteraceae	לוניאה דקת-אונות				
1363	Launaea mucronata	Asteraceae	לוניאה מחודדת				
1364	Launaea nudicaulis	Asteraceae	לוניאה שרועה				
1365	Launaea spinosa	Asteraceae	לוניאה קוצנית				
1366	Laurus nobilis	Lauraceae	ער אציל				
1367	Lavandula coronopifolia	Lamiaceae	אזוביון מדברי				
1368	Lavandula dentata	Lamiaceae	אזוביון משנן				
1369	Lavandula pubescens	Lamiaceae	אזוביון שעיר				
1370	Lavandula stoechas	Lamiaceae	אזוביון דגול				
1371	Lavatera arborea	Malvaceae	מעוג השיח				
1372	Lavatera bryoniifolia	Malvaceae	מעוג קיפח				
1373	Lavatera cretica	Malvaceae	מעוג כרתי				
1374	Lavatera punctata	Malvaceae	מעוג מנוקד				
1375	Lavatera trimestris	Malvaceae	מעוג אפיל				
1376	Lecokia cretica	Apiaceae	לקוקיה כרתית				
1377	Leersia hexandra	Poaceae	בת-ארז משושה				
1378	Legousia falcata	Campanulaceae	סגולית חרמשית				
1379	Legousia hybrida	Campanulaceae	סגולית הכלאיים				
1380	Legousia pentagonia	Campanulaceae	סגולית מחומשת				
1381	Legousia speculum-veneris	Campanulaceae	סגולית נאה				
1382	Lemna gibba	Lemnaceae	עדשת-מים גיבנת				
1383	Lemna minor	Lemnaceae	עדשת-מים זעירה				
1384	Lemna trisulca	Lemnaceae	עדשת-מים מצליבה				
1385	Lens ervoides	Papilionaceae	עדשה מצויה				
1386	Lens odemensis	Papilionaceae	עדשת הר-אודם				
1387	Lens orientalis	Papilionaceae	עדשה מזרחית				
1388	Leontice leontopetalum	Berberidaceae	ערטנית השדות				
1389	Leontodon asperrimus	Asteraceae	שן-ארי מחוספסת				
1390	Leontodon laciniatus	Asteraceae	שן-ארי שעירה				
1391	Leontodon tuberosus	Asteraceae	כתמה עבת-שורשים				
1392	Leopoldia bicolor	Liliaceae	מצילות החוף				
1393	Leopoldia comosa	Liliaceae	מצילות מצויצות				
1394	Leopoldia deserticola	Liliaceae	מצילות מדבריות				
1395	Leopoldia eburnea	Liliaceae	מצילות שנהב				
1396	Leopoldia longipes	Liliaceae	מצילות ארוכות-עוקץ				
1397	Leopoldia pinardi	Liliaceae	מצילות צרות				
1398	Lepidium aucheri	Brassicaceae	שחליים שרועים				
1399	Lepidium hirtum	Brassicaceae	שחליים שעירים				
1400	Lepidium latifolium	Brassicaceae	שחליים גבוהים				
1401	Lepidium ruderale	Brassicaceae	שחליים עדינים				
1402	Lepidium spinescens	Brassicaceae	שחליים דוקרניים				
1403	Lepidium spinosum	Brassicaceae	שחליים קוצניים				
1404	Leptadenia pyrotechnica	Asclepiadaceae	מעלה-עשן מדברי				
1405	Leptaleum filifolium	Brassicaceae	בינית המדבר				
1406	Leptochloa fusca	Poaceae	דו-מוץ חום				
1407	Leptochloa mucronata	Poaceae	דו-מוץ חדוד				
1408	Leptochloa uninervia	Poaceae	דו-מוץ מעורק				
1409	Leysera leyseroides	Asteraceae	ישומון נימי				
1410	Lilium candidum	Liliaceae	שושן צחור				
1411	Limbarda crithmoides	Asteraceae	בן-טיון בשרני				
1412	Limodorum abortivum	Orchidaceae	שנק החורש				
1413	Limonium galilaeum	Plumbaginaceae	עדעד הגליל				
1414	Limonium lobatum	Plumbaginaceae	עדעד המדבר				
1415	Limonium narbonense	Plumbaginaceae	עדעד הביצות				
1416	Limonium pruinosum	Plumbaginaceae	עדעד מאובק				
1417	Limonium sinuatum	Plumbaginaceae	עדעד כחול				
1418	Limonium virgatum	Plumbaginaceae	עדעד רותמי				
1419	Linaria albifrons	Scrophulariaceae	פשתנית מלבינה				
1420	Linaria aucheri	Scrophulariaceae	פשתנית אושה				
1421	Linaria chalepensis	Scrophulariaceae	פשתנית ארם-צובא				
1422	Linaria damascena	Scrophulariaceae	פשתנית דמשקאית				
1423	Linaria haelava	Scrophulariaceae	פשתנית ססגונית				
1424	Linaria joppensis	Scrophulariaceae	פשתנית יפו				
1425	Linaria micrantha	Scrophulariaceae	פשתנית זעירה				
1426	Linaria pelisseriana	Scrophulariaceae	פשתנית ריסנית				
1427	Linaria simplex	Scrophulariaceae	פשתנית קטנת-פרחים				
1428	Linaria tenuis	Scrophulariaceae	פשתנית אשקלון				
1429	Linaria triphylla	Scrophulariaceae	פשתנית משולשת				
1430	Lindenbergia sinaica	Scrophulariaceae	בר-לוע סיני				
1431	Linum bienne	Linaceae	פשתה צרת-עלים				
1432	Linum corymbulosum	Linaceae	פשתת המכבד				
1433	Linum maritimum	Linaceae	פשתת החוף				
1434	Linum mucronatum	Linaceae	פשתה גדולה				
1435	Linum nodiflorum	Linaceae	פשתה מצויה				
1436	Linum peyronii	Linaceae	פשתת הערבות				
1437	Linum pubescens	Linaceae	פשתה שעירה				
1438	Linum strictum	Linaceae	פשתה אשונה				
1439	Linum toxicum	Linaceae	פשתה ארסית				
1440	Linum trigynum	Linaceae	פשתה משלשת				
1441	Lisaea strigosa	Apiaceae	ליסיאה סורית				
1442	Lobularia arabica	Brassicaceae	מללנית ערבית				
1443	Lobularia libyca	Brassicaceae	מללנית מצרית				
1444	Loeflingia hispanica	Caryophyllaceae	מרצענית ספרדית				
1445	Logfia davisii	Asteraceae	לוגפיית השדה				
1446	Logfia gallica	Asteraceae	לוגפייה צרפתית				
1447	Loliolum subulatum (syn. of Festuca orientalis)	Poaceae	נרדורית מזרחית				
1448	Lolium multiflorum	Poaceae	זון רב-פרחים				
1449	Lolium perenne	Poaceae	זון רב-שנתי				
1450	Lolium persicum	Poaceae	זון פרסי				
1451	Lolium rigidum	Poaceae	זון אשון				
1452	Lolium subulatum	Poaceae	זון מרצעני				
1453	Lolium temulentum	Poaceae	זון משכר				
1454	Lomelosia argentea	Dipsacaceae	תגית קיצית				
1455	Lomelosia palaestina	Dipsacaceae	תגית ארץ-ישראלית				
1456	Lomelosia porphyroneura	Dipsacaceae	תגית ארגמנית				
1457	Lomelosia prolifera	Dipsacaceae	תגית מצויה				
1458	Lonicera arborea	Caprifoliaceae	יערת המטבעות				
1459	Lonicera etrusca	Caprifoliaceae	יערה איטלקית				
1460	Lotononis platycarpa	Papilionaceae	לוטונית מדוקרנת				
1461	Lotus angustissimus	Papilionaceae	לוטוס דקיק				
1462	Lotus conimbricensis	Papilionaceae	לוטוס ריסני				
1463	Lotus corniculatus	Papilionaceae	לוטוס מקרין				
1464	Lotus creticus	Papilionaceae	לוטוס מכסיף				
1465	Lotus cytisoides	Papilionaceae	לוטוס קירח				
1466	Lotus edulis	Papilionaceae	לוטוס נאכל				
1467	Lotus glinoides	Papilionaceae	לוטוס אילתי				
1468	Lotus halophilus	Papilionaceae	לוטוס שעיר				
1469	Lotus lanuginosus	Papilionaceae	לוטוס מדברי				
1470	Lotus longisiliquosus	Papilionaceae	לוטוס יהודה				
1471	Lotus ornithopodioides	Papilionaceae	לוטוס משונץ				
1472	Lotus palustris	Papilionaceae	לוטוס הביצות				
1473	Lotus peregrinus	Papilionaceae	לוטוס מצוי				
1474	Lotus tenuis	Papilionaceae	לוטוס צר-עלים				
1475	Ludwigia palustris	Onagraceae	מדד הביצות				
1476	Ludwigia stolonifera	Onagraceae	מדד זוחל				
1477	Lupinus angustifolius	Papilionaceae	תורמוס צר-עלים				
1478	Lupinus hispanicus	Papilionaceae	תורמוס ספרדי				
1479	Lupinus luteus	Papilionaceae	תורמוס צהוב				
1480	Lupinus micranthus	Papilionaceae	תורמוס שעיר				
1481	Lupinus palaestinus	Papilionaceae	תורמוס ארץ-ישראלי				
1482	Lupinus pilosus	Papilionaceae	תורמוס ההרים				
1483	Lycium depressum	Solanaceae	אטד רב-פרחים				
1484	Lycium europaeum	Solanaceae	אטד אירופי				
1485	Lycium schweinfurthii	Solanaceae	אטד החוף				
1486	Lycium shawii	Solanaceae	אטד ערבי				
1487	Lycopus europaeus	Lamiaceae	כף-זאב אירופית				
1488	Lysimachia dubia	Primulaceae	ליסימכיה מסופקת				
1489	Lythrum borysthenicum	Lytheraceae	שנית רחבת-עלים				
1490	Lythrum hyssopifolia	Lytheraceae	שנית קטנת-עלים				
1491	Lythrum junceum	Lytheraceae	שנית מתפתלת				
1492	Lythrum salicaria	Lytheraceae	שנית גדולה				
1493	Lythrum thymifolium	Lytheraceae	שנית הקורנית				
1494	Lythrum tribracteatum	Lytheraceae	שנית שוות-שיניים				
1495	Maerua crassifolia	Capparaceae	מרואה עבת-עלים				
1496	Majorana syriaca	Lamiaceae	אזוב מצוי				
1497	Malabaila secacul	Apiaceae	אגורה מדברית				
1498	Malcolmia africana	Brassicaceae	מלקולמייה אפריקנית				
1499	Malcolmia chia	Brassicaceae	מלקולמייה הררית				
1500	Malcolmia crenulata	Brassicaceae	מלקולמייה חרוקה				
1501	Malcolmia exacoides	Brassicaceae	מלקולמייה צהובה				
1502	Malva aegyptia	Malvaceae	חלמית מצרית				
1503	Malva neglecta	Malvaceae	חלמית זנוחה				
1504	Malva nicaeensis	Malvaceae	חלמית מצויה				
1505	Malva oxyloba	Malvaceae	חלמית חדת-אונות				
1506	Malva parviflora	Malvaceae	חלמית קטנת-פרחים				
1507	Malva sylvestris	Malvaceae	חלמית גדולה				
1508	Malvella sherardiana	Malvaceae	בת-חלמית שרועה				
1509	Mandragora autumnalis	Solanaceae	דודא רפואי				
1510	Mantisalca salmantica	Asteraceae	מנטיסלקה מדברית				
1511	Maresia nana	Brassicaceae	מרסיה זעירה				
1512	Maresia pulchella	Brassicaceae	מרסיה יפהפייה				
1513	Maresia pygmaea	Brassicaceae	מרסיה ננסית				
1514	Marrubium alysson	Lamiaceae	מרמר הנגב				
1515	Marrubium cuneatum	Lamiaceae	מרמר הערבות				
1516	Marrubium libanoticum	Lamiaceae	מרמר הלבנון				
1517	Marrubium vulgare	Lamiaceae	מרמר מצוי				
1518	Marsilea minuta	Marsileaceae	מרסיליה זעירה				
1519	Matricaria aurea	Asteraceae	בבונג זהוב				
1520	Matricaria recutita	Asteraceae	בבונג דו-גוני				
1521	Matthiola arabica	Brassicaceae	מנתור ערבי				
1522	Matthiola aspera	Brassicaceae	מנתור מחוספס				
1523	Matthiola incana	Brassicaceae	מנתור אפור				
1524	Matthiola livida	Brassicaceae	מנתור המדבר				
1525	Matthiola longipetala	Brassicaceae	מנתור מצוי				
1526	Matthiola parviflora	Brassicaceae	מנתור קטן-פרחים				
1527	Matthiola tricuspidata	Brassicaceae	מנתור החוף				
1528	Medicago arborea	Papilionaceae	אספסת השיח				
1529	Medicago astroites	Papilionaceae	גרגרנית מאוצבעת				
1530	Medicago blancheana	Papilionaceae	אספסת בלאנש				
1531	Medicago ciliaris	Papilionaceae	אספסת ריסנית				
1532	Medicago constricta	Papilionaceae	אספסת כדורית				
1533	Medicago coronata	Papilionaceae	אספסת הכתרים				
1534	Medicago doliata	Papilionaceae	אספסת שכנית				
1535	Medicago falcata	Papilionaceae	אספסת חרמשית				
1536	Medicago granadensis	Papilionaceae	אספסת הגליל				
1537	Medicago hypogaea	Papilionaceae			فصة تحت أرضية		
1538	Medicago italica	Papilionaceae	אספסת איטלקית				
1539	Medicago laciniata	Papilionaceae	אספסת מפוצלת				
1540	Medicago littoralis	Papilionaceae	אספסת החוף				
1541	Medicago lupulina	Papilionaceae	אספסת זעירה				
1542	Medicago marina	Papilionaceae	אספסת הים				
1543	Medicago minima	Papilionaceae	אספסת קטנה				
1544	Medicago monantha	Papilionaceae	גרגרנית חד-פרחית		فصة وحيدة السداة		
1545	Medicago monspeliaca	Papilionaceae	גרגרנית מצויה		فصة مونبلييه		
1546	Medicago murex	Papilionaceae	אספסת החילזון		فصة محارية		
1547	Medicago orbicularis	Papilionaceae	אספסת עדשתית		فصة زرية		
1548	Medicago polymorpha	Papilionaceae	אספסת מצויה		فصة متعددة الأشكال		
1549	Medicago radiata	Papilionaceae	אספסת מצויצת		فصة مشعشعة		
1550	Medicago rigidula	Papilionaceae	אספסת אשונה		فصة صلبة		
1551	Medicago rotata	Papilionaceae	אספסת גלגלית		فصة دائرية		
1552	Medicago rugosa	Papilionaceae	אספסת מקומטת				
1553	Medicago scutellata	Papilionaceae	אספסת קעורה		فصة حرشفية		
1554	Medicago truncatula	Papilionaceae	אספסת קטועה				
1555	Medicago turbinata	Papilionaceae	אספסת החבית		فصة لولبية		
1556	Melica minuta	Poaceae	הררית קטנה				
1557	Melica persica	Poaceae	הררית שעירה				
1558	Melilotus albus	Papilionaceae	דבשה לבנה				
1559	Melilotus elegans	Papilionaceae	דבשה הדורה				
1560	Melilotus indicus	Papilionaceae	דבשה הודית				
1561	Melilotus italicus	Papilionaceae	דבשה איטלקית				
1562	Melilotus siculus	Papilionaceae	דבשה סיצילית				
1563	Melilotus sulcatus	Papilionaceae	דבשה מחורצת				
1564	Melissa officinalis	Lamiaceae	מליסה רפואית				
1565	Mentha aquatica	Lamiaceae	נענע המים				
1566	Mentha longifolia	Lamiaceae	נענע משובלת				
1567	Mentha pulegium	Lamiaceae	נענע הכדורים				
1568	Mentha suaveolens	Lamiaceae	נענע ריחנית				
1569	Mercurialis annua	Euphorbiaceae	מרקולית מצויה				
1570	Mericarpaea ciliata	Rubiaceae	פרודתיים מכורבלות				
1571	Mesembryanthemum crystallinum	Aizoaceae	אהל הגבישים				
1572	Mesembryanthemum nodiflorum	Aizoaceae	אהל מצוי				
1573	Michauxia campanuloides	Campanulaceae	מישויה פעמונית				
1574	Micromeria danaensis	Lamiaceae	זוטת דנא				
1575	Micromeria fruticosa	Lamiaceae	זוטה לבנה				
1576	Micromeria myrtifolia	Lamiaceae	זוטה צפופה				
1577	Micromeria nervosa	Lamiaceae	זוטה מעורקת				
1578	Micromeria sinaica	Lamiaceae	זוטת סיני				
1579	Microparacaryum intermedium	Boraginaceae	הילל קטן				
1580	Micropus supinus	Asteraceae	כתנן שרוע				
1581	Milium pedicellare	Poaceae	רפרף ארוך-עוקצים				
1582	Milium vernale	Poaceae	רפרף אביבי				
1583	Minuartia decipiens	Caryophyllaceae	צללית אשונה				
1584	Minuartia formosa	Caryophyllaceae	צללית הדורה				
1585	Minuartia globulosa	Caryophyllaceae	צללית החורש				
1586	Minuartia hamata	Caryophyllaceae	צללית מאונקלת				
1587	Minuartia hybrida	Caryophyllaceae	צללית הכלאיים				
1588	Minuartia juniperina	Caryophyllaceae	צללית ערערית				
1589	Minuartia mediterranea	Caryophyllaceae	צללית ים-תיכונית				
1590	Minuartia meyeri	Caryophyllaceae	צללית מזרחית				
1591	Minuartia picta	Caryophyllaceae	צללית נאה				
1592	Minuartia sinaica	Caryophyllaceae	צללית סיני				
1593	Misopates calycinum	Scrophulariaceae	לועית ארוכת-גביע				
1594	Misopates orontium	Scrophulariaceae	לועית קטנה				
1595	Moenchia erecta	Caryophyllaceae	מנכיה עדינה				
1596	Moltkiopsis ciliata	Boraginaceae	גלעינון החוף				
1597	Moluccella laevis	Lamiaceae	בר-גביע חלק				
1598	Moluccella spinosa	Lamiaceae	בר-גביע קוצני				
1599	Monerma cylindrica	Poaceae	גלימה גלילנית				
1600	Monsonia heliotropioides	Geraniaceae	בהק עקרבי				
1601	Monsonia nivea	Geraniaceae	בהק צחור				
1602	Moraea mediterranea	Iridaceae	צהרון קטן				
1603	Moraea sisyrinchium	Iridaceae	צהרון מצוי				
1604	Morettia canescens	Brassicaceae	מורטיה מלבינה				
1605	Morettia parviflora	Brassicaceae	מורטיה קטנת-פרחים				
1606	Morettia philaeana	Brassicaceae	מורטיה מחוספסת				
1607	Moricandia nitens	Brassicaceae	מוריקה מבריקה				
1608	Moricandia sinaica	Brassicaceae	מוריקת סיני				
1609	Moringa peregrina	Moringaceae	מורינגה רותמית				
1610	Mosheovia galilaea	Scrophulariaceae	משיובית הגליל				
1611	Muscari commutatum	Liliaceae	כדן סגול				
1612	Muscari neglectum	Liliaceae	כדן אשכולי				
1613	Muscari parviflorum	Liliaceae	כדן קטן-פרחים				
1614	Myagrum perfoliatum	Brassicaceae	מיאגרון אוזני				
1615	Myosotis ramosissima	Boraginaceae	זכריני מסועף				
1616	Myosotis refracta	Boraginaceae	זכריני מופשל				
1617	Myosotis stricta	Boraginaceae	זכריני זקוף-עוקצים				
1618	Myosotis uncata	Boraginaceae	זכריני מאונקל				
1619	Myosurus minimus	Ranunculaceae	זנב-עכבר פעוט				
1620	Myriophyllum spicatum	Haloragaceae	אלף-עלה משובל				
1621	Myrtus communis	Myrtaceae	הדס מצוי				
1622	Najas delilei	Najadaceae	ניידת החוף				
1623	Najas graminea	Najadaceae	ניידה דגנית				
1624	Najas guadalupensis	Najadaceae	ניידת גואדלופ				
1625	Najas minor	Najadaceae	ניידה קטנה				
1626	Narcissus serotinus	Amaryllidaceae	נרקיס סתווי				
1627	Narcissus tazetta	Amaryllidaceae	נרקיס מצוי				
1628	Nasturtiopsis coronopifolia	Brassicaceae	גרגריון ערבי				
1629	Nasturtium officinale	Brassicaceae	גרגר הנחלים				
1630	Neotinea maculata	Orchidaceae	נאוטינאה תמימה				
1631	Neotorularia torulosa	Brassicaceae	שנס המדבר				
1632	Nepeta cilicia	Lamiaceae	נפית קיליקית				
1633	Nepeta curviflora	Lamiaceae	נפית כפופה				
1634	Nepeta italica	Lamiaceae	נפית איטלקית				
1635	Nepeta trachonitica	Lamiaceae	נפית הבשן				
1636	Nerium oleander	Apocynaceae	הרדוף הנחלים				
1637	Neslia apiculata	Brassicaceae	רשתון השדות				
1638	Neurada procumbens	Neuradaceae	כפתור החולות				
1639	Nicandra physalodes	Solanaceae	ניקנדרה בוענית				
1640	Nigella arvensis	Ranunculaceae	קצח השדה				
1641	Nigella ciliaris	Ranunculaceae	קצח ריסני				
1642	Nigella segetalis	Ranunculaceae	קצח הקמה				
1643	Nitraria retusa	Zygophyllaceae	ימלוח פגום				
1644	Nitraria schoberi	Zygophyllaceae	ימלוח תמים				
1645	Noaea mucronata	Chenopodiaceae	נואית קוצנית				
1646	Nonea echioides	Boraginaceae	נוניאה כרסנית				
1647	Nonea melanocarpa	Boraginaceae	נוניאה נאה				
1648	Nonea obtusifolia	Boraginaceae	נוניאה קהה				
1649	Nonea philistaea	Boraginaceae	נוניאה פלשתית				
1650	Notobasis syriaca	Asteraceae	ברקן סורי				
1651	Notoceras bicorne	Brassicaceae	דו-קרן מדברית				
1652	Nuphar lutea	Nymphaeaceae	נופר צהוב				
1653	Nymphaea alba	Nymphaeaceae	נימפאה לבנה				
1654	Nymphaea nouchali	Nymphaeaceae	נימפאה תכולה				
1655	Ochradenus baccatus	Resedaceae	רכפתן מדברי				
1656	Ochthodium aegyptiacum	Brassicaceae	חטוטרן מצוי				
1657	Odontites aucheri	Scrophulariaceae	שיננית צהובה				
1658	Oenanthe fistulosa	Apiaceae	יינית נבובה				
1659	Oenanthe pimpinelloides	Apiaceae	יינית כמנונית				
1660	Oenanthe prolifera	Apiaceae	יינית חרוזה				
1661	Oenanthe silaifolia	Apiaceae	יינית בינונית				
1662	Ogastemma pusillum	Boraginaceae	מגסטומה זעירה				
1663	Oldenlandia capensis	Rubiaceae	אולדנית הכף				
1664	Olea europaea	Oleaceae	זית אירופי				
1665	Oligomeris linifolia	Resedaceae	בת-רכפה מרצענית				
1666	Onobrychis caput-galli	Papilionaceae	כרבולת קטנה				
1667	Onobrychis cornuta	Papilionaceae	כרבולת מקרינה				
1668	Onobrychis crista-galli	Papilionaceae	כרבולת התרנגול				
1669	Onobrychis ptolemaica	Papilionaceae	כרבולת אדומית				
1670	Onobrychis squarrosa	Papilionaceae	כרבולת מצויה				
1671	Onobrychis wettsteinii	Papilionaceae	כרבולת מדברית				
1672	Ononis alopecuroides	Papilionaceae	שברק משובל				
1673	Ononis biflora	Papilionaceae	שברק חיוור				
1674	Ononis hirta	Papilionaceae	שברק שעיר				
1675	Ononis mitissima	Papilionaceae	שברק מלבין				
1676	Ononis mollis	Papilionaceae	שברק נטוי				
1677	Ononis natrix	Papilionaceae	שברק מצוי				
1678	Ononis ornithopodioides	Papilionaceae	שברק משונץ				
1679	Ononis phyllocephala	Papilionaceae	שברק הקרקפות				
1680	Ononis pubescens	Papilionaceae	שברק דביק				
1681	Ononis pusilla	Papilionaceae	שברק פעוט				
1682	Ononis serrata	Papilionaceae	שברק משונן				
1683	Ononis sicula	Papilionaceae	שברק סיצילי				
1684	Ononis spinosa	Papilionaceae	שברק קוצני				
1685	Ononis variegata	Papilionaceae	שברק ססגוני				
1686	Ononis viscosa	Papilionaceae	שברק קצר-פרח				
1687	Onopordum alexandrinum	Asteraceae	חוחן אלכסנדרוני				
1688	Onopordum ambiguum	Asteraceae	חוחן מסופק				
1689	Onopordum anisacanthum	Asteraceae	חוחן שונה-קוצים				
1690	Onopordum blancheanum	Asteraceae	חוחן בלאנש				
1691	Onopordum carduiforme	Asteraceae	חוחן קרדני				
1692	Onopordum cynarocephalum	Asteraceae	חוחן הקנרס				
1693	Onopordum floccosum	Asteraceae	חוחן צמיר				
1694	Onopordum jordanicolum	Asteraceae	חוחן הירדן				
1695	Onopordum macrocephalum	Asteraceae	חוחן גדול-ראשים				
1696	Onopordum palaestinum	Asteraceae	חוחן ארץ-ישראלי				
1697	Onosma aaronsohnii	Boraginaceae	סומקן אהרונסון				
1698	Onosma echinata	Boraginaceae	סומקן דוקרני				
1699	Onosma frutescens	Boraginaceae	סומקן מעוצה				
1700	Onosma gigantea	Boraginaceae	סומקן ענקי				
1701	Onosma rascheyana	Boraginaceae	סומקן חרמוני				
1702	Onosma sericea	Boraginaceae	סומקן המשי				
1703	Ophioglossum lusitanicum	Ophioglosaceae	לשון-אפעה קטנה				
1704	Ophioglossum polyphyllum	Ophioglosaceae	לשון-אפעה רבת-עלים				
1705	Ophrys apifera	Orchidaceae	דבורנית הדבורה				
1706	Ophrys bornmuelleri	Orchidaceae	דבורנית נאה				
1707	Ophrys flavomarginata	Orchidaceae	דבורנית צהובת-שוליים				
1708	Ophrys holosericea	Orchidaceae	דבורנית גדולה				
1709	Ophrys iricolor	Orchidaceae	דבורנית כחלחלה				
1710	Ophrys israelitica	Orchidaceae	דבורנית שחומה				
1711	Ophrys lutea	Orchidaceae	דבורנית צהובה				
1712	Ophrys sphegodes	Orchidaceae	דבורנית הקטיפה				
1713	Ophrys umbilicata	Orchidaceae	דבורנית דינסמור				
1714	Opophytum forsskalii	Aizoaceae	אהל מגושם				
1715	Orchis anatolica	Orchidaceae	סחלב אנטולי				
1716	Orchis caspia	Orchidaceae	סחלב פרפרני				
1717	Orchis collina	Orchidaceae	סחלב השקיק				
1718	Orchis coriophora	Orchidaceae	סחלב ריחני				
1719	Orchis dinsmorei	Orchidaceae	סחלב הביצות				
1720	Orchis galilaea	Orchidaceae	סחלב הגליל				
1721	Orchis israelitica	Orchidaceae	סחלב מצויר				
1722	Orchis italica	Orchidaceae	סחלב איטלקי				
1723	Orchis punctulata	Orchidaceae	סחלב נקוד				
1724	Orchis sancta	Orchidaceae	סחלב קדוש				
1725	Orchis syriaca	Orchidaceae	סחלב סורי				
1726	Orchis tridentata	Orchidaceae	סחלב שלוש-השיניים				
1727	Origanum dayi	Lamiaceae	אזובית המדבר				
1728	Origanum isthmicum	Lamiaceae	אזובית סיני				
1729	Origanum jordanicum	Lamiaceae	אזובית ירדנית				
1730	Origanum petraeum	Lamiaceae	אזובית פטרה				
1731	Origanum punonense	Lamiaceae	אזובית פונון				
1732	Origanum ramonense	Lamiaceae	אזובית רמון				
1733	Orlaya daucoides	Apiaceae	אחיגזר ההרים				
1734	Ormenis mixta	Asteraceae	קחוונית מצויה				
1735	Ornithogalum arabicum	Liliaceae	נץ-חלב ערבי				
1736	Ornithogalum cuspidatum	Liliaceae	נץ-חלב שטוח-עלים				
1737	Ornithogalum fuscescens	Liliaceae	נץ-חלב חום				
1738	Ornithogalum lanceolatum	Liliaceae	נץ-חלב אזמלני				
1739	Ornithogalum montanum	Liliaceae	נץ-חלב הררי				
1740	Ornithogalum narbonense	Liliaceae	נץ-חלב צרפתי				
1741	Ornithogalum neurostegium	Liliaceae	נץ-חלב שעיר				
1742	Ornithogalum trichophyllum	Liliaceae	נץ-חלב דק-עלים				
1743	Ornithogalum umbellatum	Liliaceae	נץ-חלב מפושק				
1744	Ornithopus compressus	Papilionaceae	כף-עוף פחוסה				
1745	Ornithopus pinnatus	Papilionaceae	כף-עוף מנוצה				
1746	Orobanche aegyptiaca	Orobanchaceae	עלקת מצרית				
1747	Orobanche caerulescens	Orobanchaceae	עלקת תכולה				
1748	Orobanche camptolepis	Orobanchaceae	עלקת כפופת-חפים				
1749	Orobanche cernua	Orobanchaceae	עלקת נטויה				
1750	Orobanche crenata	Orobanchaceae	עלקת חרוקה				
1751	Orobanche hermonis	Orobanchaceae	עלקת החרמון				
1752	Orobanche lavandulacea	Orobanchaceae	עלקת סגולת-פרחים				
1753	Orobanche loricata	Orobanchaceae	עלקת ארגמנית				
1754	Orobanche mutelii	Orobanchaceae	עלקת מוטל				
1755	Orobanche palaestina	Orobanchaceae	עלקת ארץ-ישראלית				
1756	Orobanche pubescens	Orobanchaceae	עלקת רכת-שער				
1757	Orobanche ramosa	Orobanchaceae	עלקת ענפה				
1758	Orobanche schultzii	Orobanchaceae	עלקת שולץ				
1759	Orthurus heterocarpus	Rosaceae	זנבן שנוי-פירות				
1760	Osyris alba	Santalaceae	שבטן לבן				
1761	Otanthus maritimus	Asteraceae	לבנונית ימית				
1762	Oxystelma alpini	Asclepiadaceae	אחי-חרגל אפריקני				
