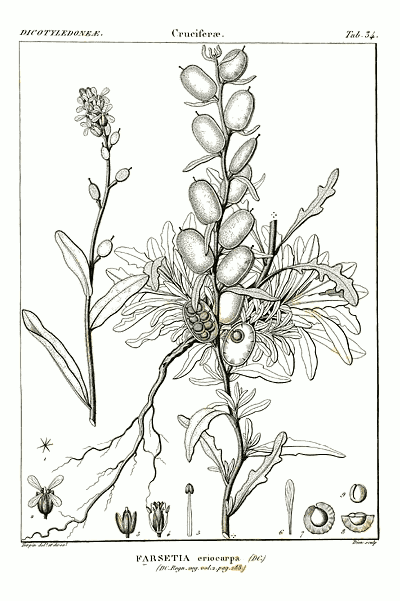
- Fibigia clypeata var. eriocarpa

Scientific classification
- Kingdom: Plantae
- Clade: Tracheophytes
- Clade: Angiosperms
- Clade: Eudicots
- Clade: Rosids
- Order: Brassicales
- Family: Brassicaceae
- Genus: Fibigia; Medik.

= Fibigia =

Genus of flowering plants

Fibigia is a genus of flowering plants in the family Brassicaceae. It includes six species native to the eastern Mediterranean, Western Asia, and the Caucasus.

== Species ==
Six species are accepted.

- Fibigia clypeata (L.) Medik.
- Fibigia heterophylla Rech.f.
- Fibigia kermanshahensis Ranjbar & Karami
- Fibigia khoshyelaqensis Ranjbar & Rostami
- Fibigia macrocarpa (Boiss.) Boiss.
- Fibigia tabriziana Ranjbar & Karami
