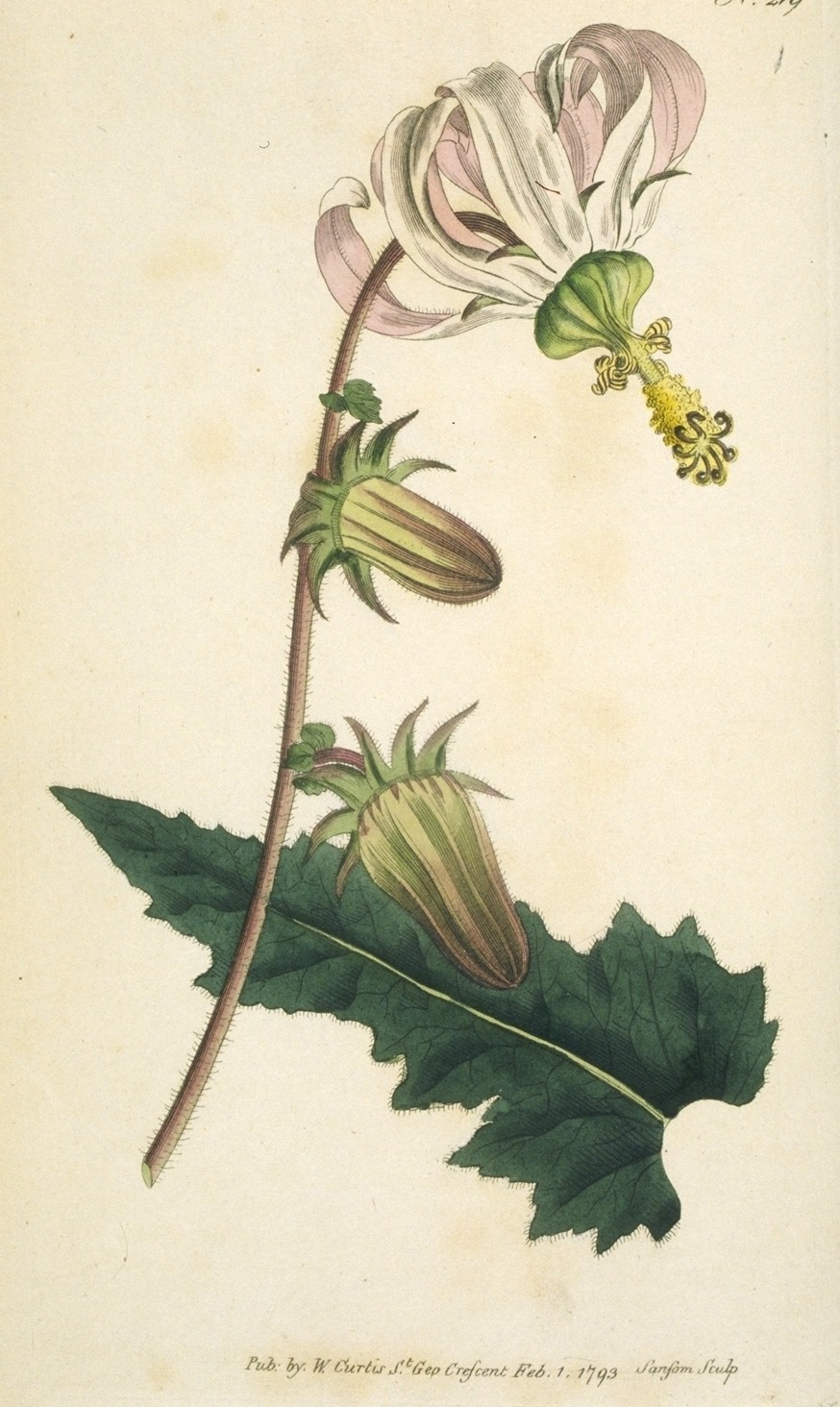
- Michauxia campanuloides

Scientific classification
- Kingdom: Plantae
- Clade: Tracheophytes
- Clade: Angiosperms
- Clade: Eudicots
- Clade: Asterids
- Order: Asterales
- Family: Campanulaceae
- Subfamily: Campanuloideae
- Genus: Michauxia; L'Hér.

= Michauxia =

Genus of flowering plants

Michauxia is a genus of plants in the family Campanulaceae. First described in 1788, this genus contains 8 known species native to southwestern Asia.

- Michauxia campanuloides L'Hér. - Turkey, Syria, Lebanon, Palestine
- Michauxia koeieana Rech.f. - Iran
- Michauxia laevigata Vent. - Caucasus, Iran, Iraq, Turkey
- Michauxia mormoriana Jalilian and Rastegari - Iran
- Michauxia nuda A.DC. in A.P.de Candolle - Turkey, Syria, Lebanon, Iraq
- Michauxia stenophylla Boiss. & Hausskn. in P.E.Boissier - Iran
- Michauxia tchihatcheffii Fisch. & C.A.Mey. - Turkey
- Michauxia thyrsoidea Boiss. & Heldr. in P.E.Boissier - Turkey

== Medicinal properties ==
Several species of Michauxia - notably M. nuda and M. tchihatcheffii - are used in the treatment of wounds in Turkish folk medicine. Recent scientific evaluation has confirmed that these plants possess wound-healing, anti-inflammatory and antioxidant properties.
