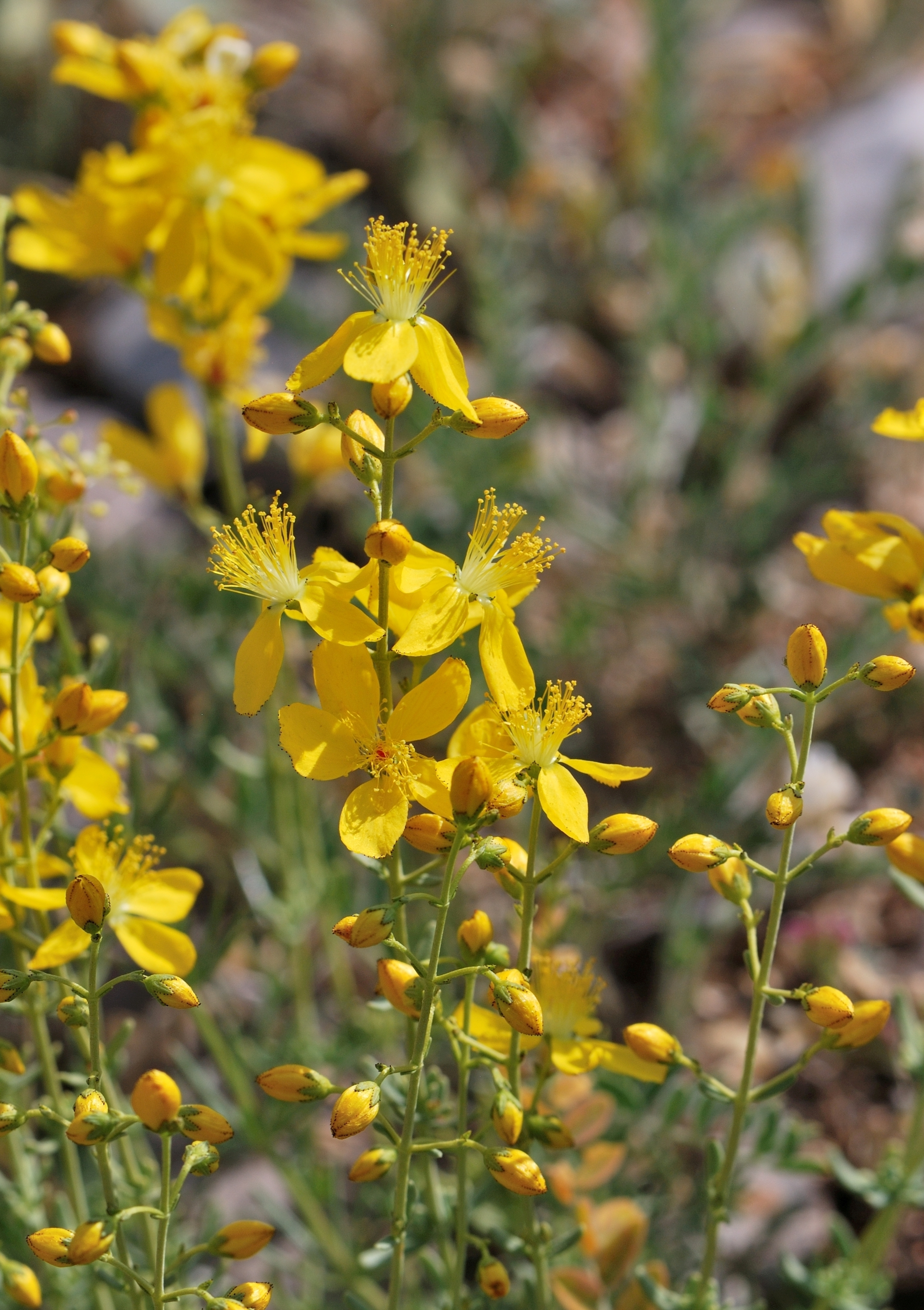

Scientific classification
- Kingdom: Plantae
- Clade: Tracheophytes
- Clade: Angiosperms
- Clade: Eudicots
- Clade: Rosids
- Order: Malpighiales
- Family: Hypericaceae
- Genus: Hypericum
- Subgenus: Hypericum subg. Hypericum
- Section: Hypericum sect. Hirtella
- Species: H. libanoticum

Binomial name
- Hypericum libanoticum N.Robson

= Hypericum libanoticum =

Species of flowering plant

Hypericum libanoticum, commonly referred to as the Lebanon St. John's-wort, is a species of flowering plant in the family Hypericaceae. The species was described by Norman Robson in 1970 in Paul Mouterde's Nouvelle Flore du Liban et de la Syrie. The species is native to Lebanon and southwestern Syria, where it occurs on limestone slopes at high elevations.

== Description ==
Hypericum libanoticum is a glabrous, suffrutescent perennial with numerous sterile, densely leafy stems at the base. The floriferous stems are erect or ascending, reaching heights of approximately 60 centimetres, and are marked longitudinally by two faint lines. Leaves on the flowering stems are 4–15 mm long and 1–2 mm wide, and are often curved. The margins of the leaves are more or less convolute, terminating in an apex that is either rounded or abruptly apiculate. The lamina is densely covered with transparent, pellucid punctures (internal glands). Axillary fascicles occur on the lower part of the flowering stems and on the sterile shoots.

The inflorescence forms an elongated, narrowly pyramidal to spike-like cyme. The petals are pale golden-yellow and 6 to 10 mm long. The petals are unguiculate and pellucid-punctate, with short black glandular cilia or subsessile black glands along the margins. The stamens are long and arranged in three bundles. The capsule is ovoid to ovoid-pyramidal, 4–6 mm long and faintly striate, with three divergent or recurved style bases. The seeds are brown, papillose, curved-cylindric, and measure approximately 2 millimetres. Flowering occurs from May to August.

It differs from H. retusum in lacking black punctation on the stems, leaves, sepals and petals. The leaf apices are eglandular, while black glands on the petals are confined to the shortly ciliate margins.

== Distribution and habitat ==
Hypericum libanoticum is native to Lebanon and Syria. It grows on rocky limestone slopes, scree, and in open woodland at elevations of 1,700–1,800 m.

In Lebanon, the species has been recorded at Jba'ah, Maasser Al-Chouf, Jabal Barouk, the Cedars of Ain Zhalta, Jabal al-Knayseh, Jabal Sannine, Hasroun, Zahlé, Wadi El-Arayesh, Yammoune, and the broader Beqaa Valley. In Syria, the species has been recorded at the upper slopes of Mount Hermon, Bloudan, Zabadani, Wadi Abou-el-Hom, Wadi-el-Harir, and Wadi-el-Qarn. The type specimen was gathered from the western slopes above Ain Zhalta.

== See also ==
- List of Hypericum species
- Flora of Lebanon
