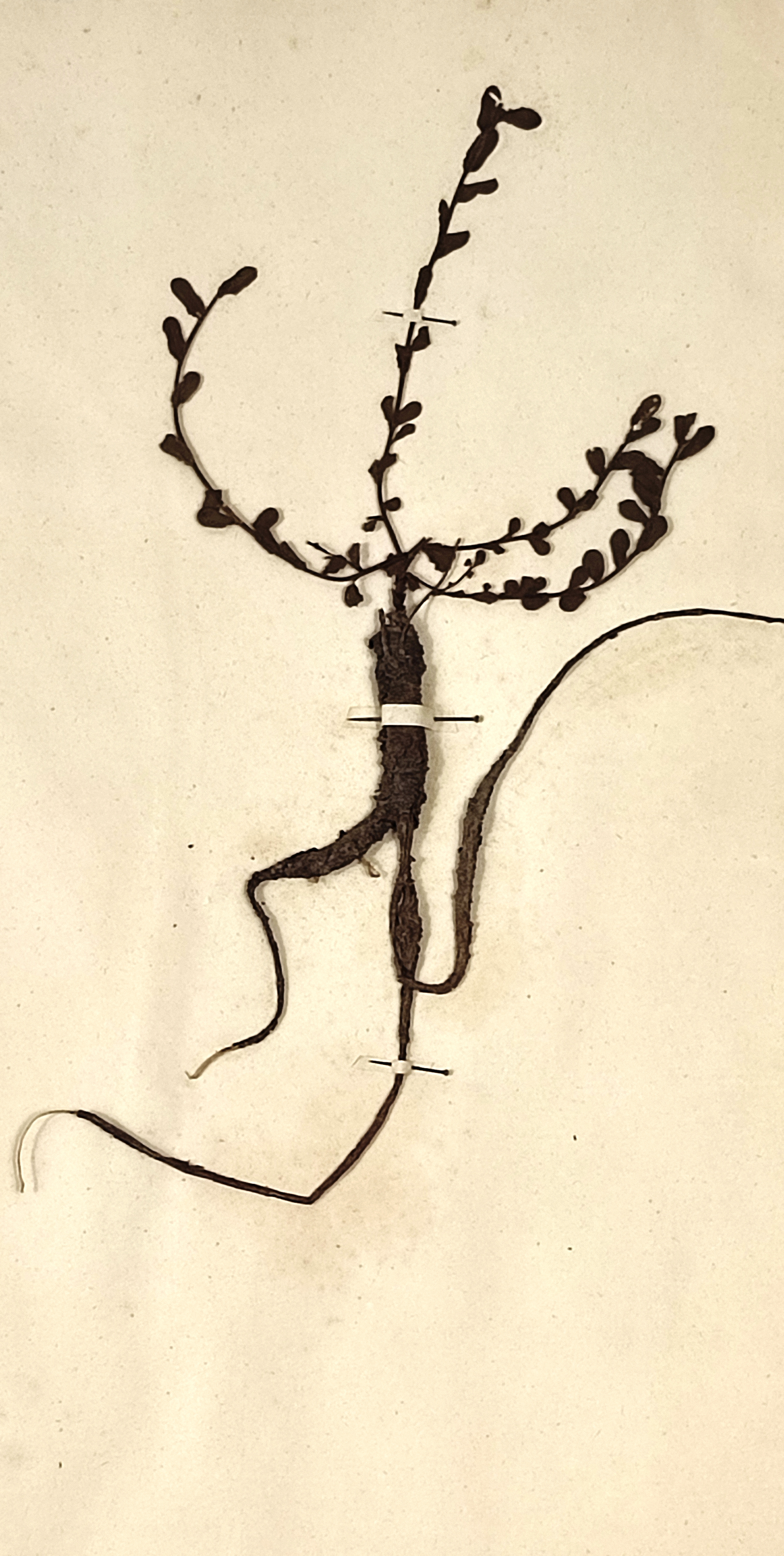

Scientific classification
- Kingdom: Plantae
- Clade: Tracheophytes
- Clade: Angiosperms
- Clade: Eudicots
- Clade: Rosids
- Order: Malpighiales
- Family: Euphorbiaceae
- Genus: Euphorbia
- Species: E. apios

Binomial name
- Euphorbia apios L., 1753

Synonyms
- Tithymalus apios (L.) Hill; Galarhoeus apios (L.) Haw. Euphorbion apium (L.) St.-Lag. Euphorbia pubigera Friv. ex Boiss. Euphorbia apios var. lamprocarpa

= Euphorbia apios =

Species of flowering plant

Euphorbia apios is a species of plant in the family Euphorbiaceae.
