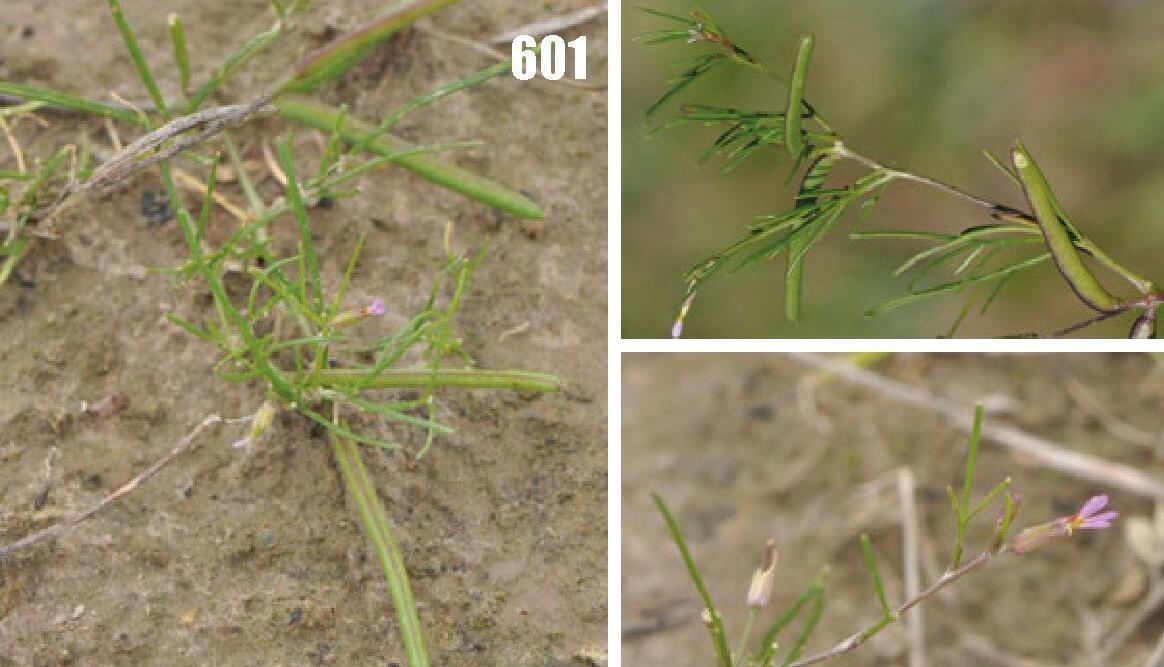
- Leptaleum filifolium

Scientific classification
- Kingdom: Plantae
- Clade: Tracheophytes
- Clade: Angiosperms
- Clade: Eudicots
- Clade: Rosids
- Order: Brassicales
- Family: Brassicaceae
- Genus: Leptaleum; DC.
- Species: L. filifolium

Binomial name
- Leptaleum filifolium (Willd.) DC.

Synonyms
- Erysimum radicale Pall. ex DC.; Leptaleum hamatum Hemsl. & Lace; Leptaleum longisiliquosum Freyn & Sint.; Leptaleum pygmaeum DC.; Sisymbrium filicifolium Georgi; Sisymbrium filifolium Willd. (1800); Sisymbrium filiformium Poir.

= Leptaleum =

Genus of plants

Leptaleum is a genus of flowering plants belonging to the family Brassicaceae. It includes a single species, Leptaleum filifolium, an annual which ranges from the eastern Mediterranean through western and central Asia to the Arabian Peninsula, Pakistan, and Xinjiang.
