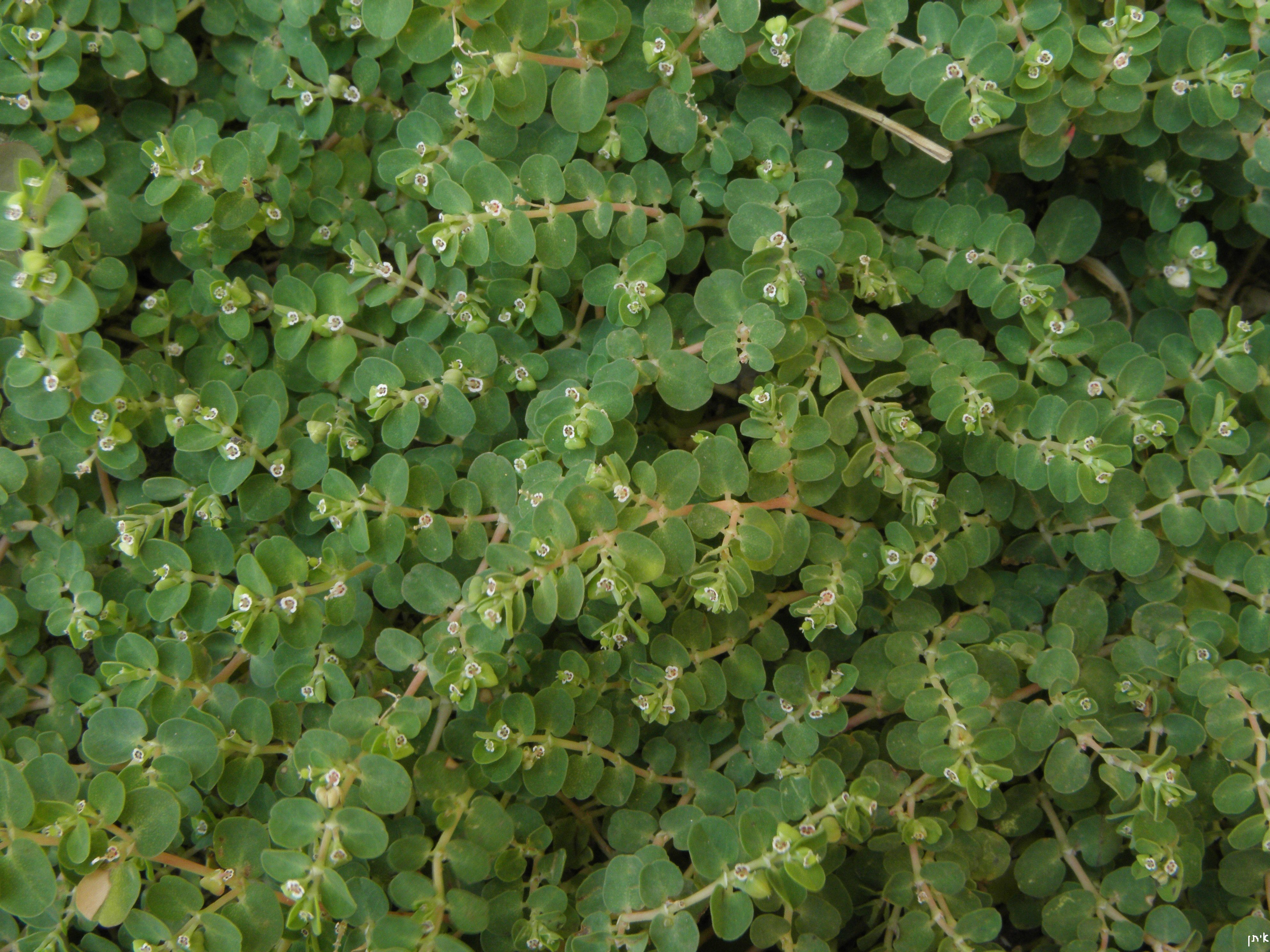

Scientific classification
- Kingdom: Plantae
- Clade: Tracheophytes
- Clade: Angiosperms
- Clade: Eudicots
- Clade: Rosids
- Order: Malpighiales
- Family: Euphorbiaceae
- Genus: Euphorbia
- Species: E. chamaesyce

Binomial name
- Euphorbia chamaesyce L.

= Euphorbia chamaesyce =

Species of flowering plant

Euphorbia chamaesyce, is an annual plant in the family Euphorbiaceae. It is native to North Africa, Europe and Asia.

== Description ==
A mat-forming annual Euphorbia, hairy or hairless, with oblique-based leaves. Fruits, 2 mm, are covered with projecting hairs (not just at the edges), or no hairs, bumpless. The leaves are weakly toothed or toothless, to 7(11) x 4.5(6) mm, leaf tips not pointed, slightly to rather greyish (glaucous) on 1 mm stalks. 'Flower' effect is formed of small but prominent white/pinkish appendages to the rounded yellowish/reddish floral glands. Seeds 1.2 mm, ovoid-quadrangular, irregularly tuberculate-rugulose, pale greyish.

In Europe similar plants are the other mat-forming Euphorbia, of which the fruit if hairy is the best distinguisher.

Subspecies as Flora Europaea has them -

ssp chamaesyce - hairless or pubescent, leaves smaller (<10mm) and rather roundish, often untoothed, tip usually notched. Petal-like appendages to glands up to twice the gland in width (so not more prominent than the gland), edge usually unlobed.

ssp massiliensis (DC.) Thell. - villous, leaves larger (to 10 mm), elongated, finely toothed (serrulate), tip rounded. Petal-like appendages to glands more than twice the gland in width (more prominent than the gland), edge often 3-lobed.

Sources: Flora Europaea, Flora of Turkey

== Habitat ==
Europe: Open habitats.

Turkey: Rocky hillsides, scree, gravel plains, saline and sandy soils, streamsides, lake shores, disturbed habitats, 0–1600 m.
