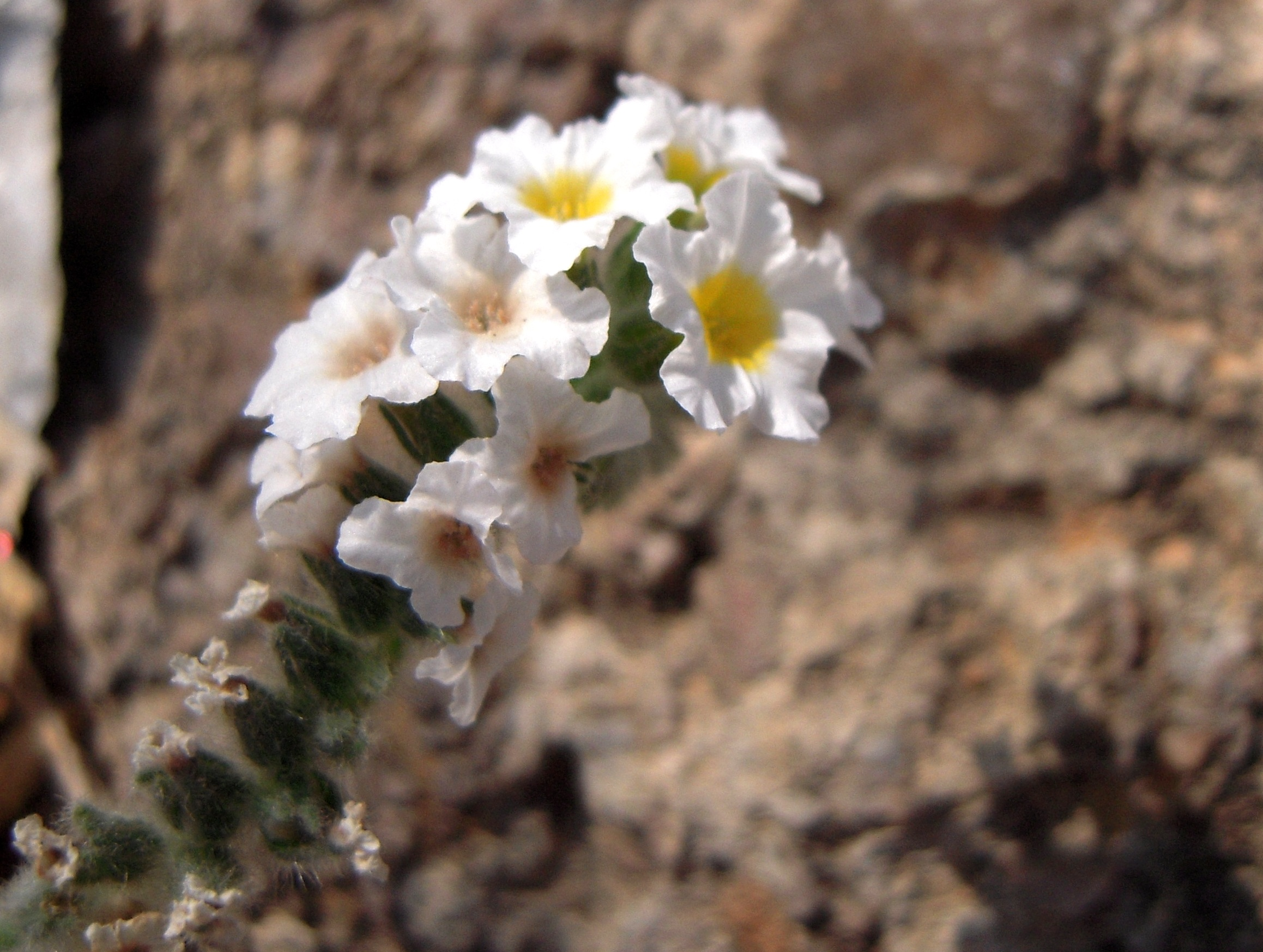
- Inflorescence

Scientific classification
- Kingdom: Plantae
- Clade: Tracheophytes
- Clade: Angiosperms
- Clade: Eudicots
- Clade: Asterids
- Order: Boraginales
- Family: Heliotropiaceae
- Genus: Heliotropium
- Species: H. hirsutissimum

Binomial name
- Heliotropium hirsutissimum Weber

Synonyms
- Heliotropium villosum Willd.

= Heliotropium hirsutissimum =

Species of flowering plant

Heliotropium hirsutissimum, the hairy heliotrope, is a species of flowering plant in the family Heliotropiaceae. It is native to the eastern Mediterranean. (Grauer is listed as the authority by some sources.)

It contains a number of pyrrolizidine alkaloids.

== Description ==
The plant grows on edges of fields, roads and tracks, and waste ground. It generally has long fine projecting hairs and greyish looking leaves, which inspires its name 'hairy heliotrope', and on maturing the flowering axes extend greatly, becoming long and curvy, the whole plant when large taking on a rather chaotic look. Its flowers are characterised by prominent hairy bulges at the mouth of their yellow throat, the yellow maturing pinkish before withering (iNaturalist photographs).

== Distribution ==
It is native to Cyprus, East Aegean Is., Egypt, Greece, Crete, Lebanon-Syria, Libya, Palestine, Turkey (Türkiye), Turkey-in-Europe.
