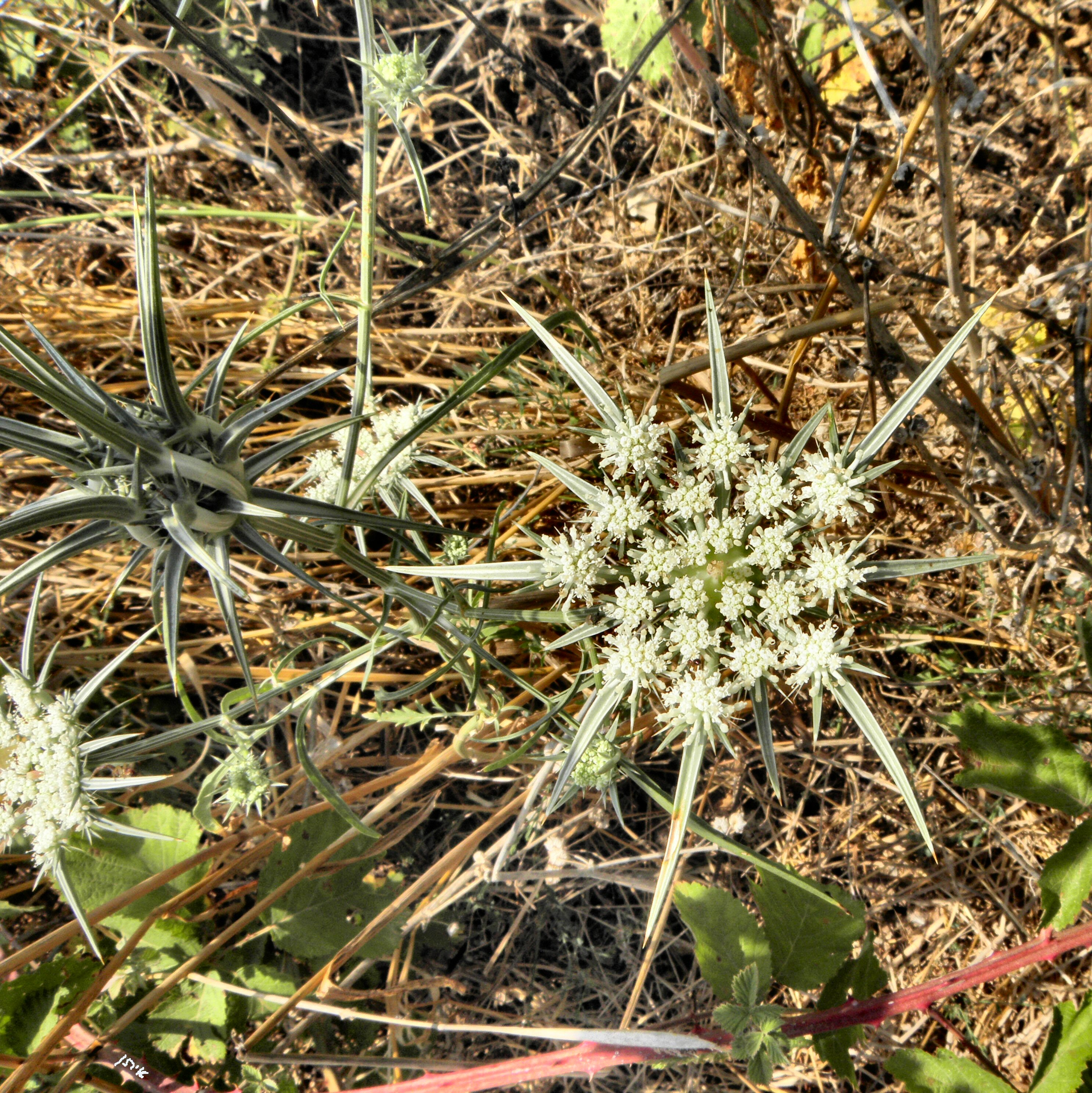
- Exoacantha heterophylla in Israel

Scientific classification
- Kingdom: Plantae
- Clade: Tracheophytes
- Clade: Angiosperms
- Clade: Eudicots
- Clade: Asterids
- Order: Apiales
- Family: Apiaceae
- Genus: Exoacantha; Labill.
- Species: E. heterophylla

Binomial name
- Exoacantha heterophylla Labill.

= Exoacantha =

Genus of plants

Exoacantha is a genus of flowering plants belonging to the family Apiaceae. It has only one species, Exoacantha heterophylla, native from southern Turkey to Syria.
