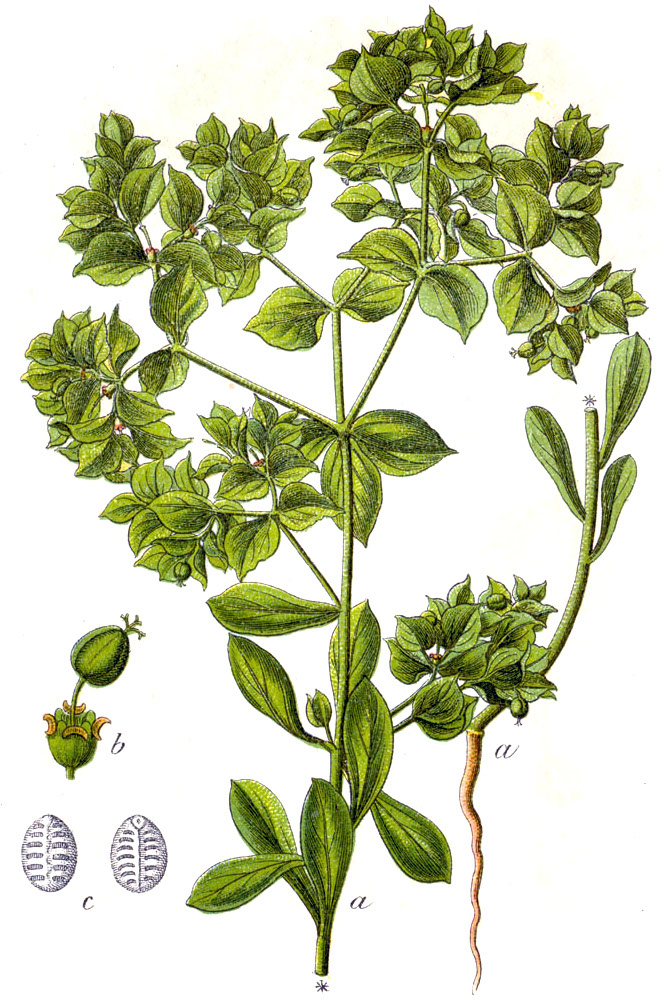

Scientific classification
- Kingdom: Plantae
- Clade: Tracheophytes
- Clade: Angiosperms
- Clade: Eudicots
- Clade: Rosids
- Order: Malpighiales
- Family: Euphorbiaceae
- Genus: Euphorbia
- Species: E. falcata

Binomial name
- Euphorbia falcata L.

Synonyms
- Esula falcata (L.) Haw.; Euphorbia falcata var. genuina Maire; Galarhoeus falcatus (L.) Prokh.; Keraselma falcatum (L.) Raf. in Fl. Tellur. 4: 116 (1838); Tithymalus falcatus (L.) Klotzsch & Garcke

= Euphorbia falcata =

Species of plant

Euphorbia falcata (sickle spurge), is a species of Euphorbia, native to most of Europe, northern Africa, and Asia, and naturalised in other parts of the world.

Two subspecies are recognised:

- Euphorbia falcata subsp. falcata: throughout the range of the species
- Euphorbia falcata subsp. macrostegia (Bornm.) O.Schwartz: restricted to Cyprus and western Turkey
