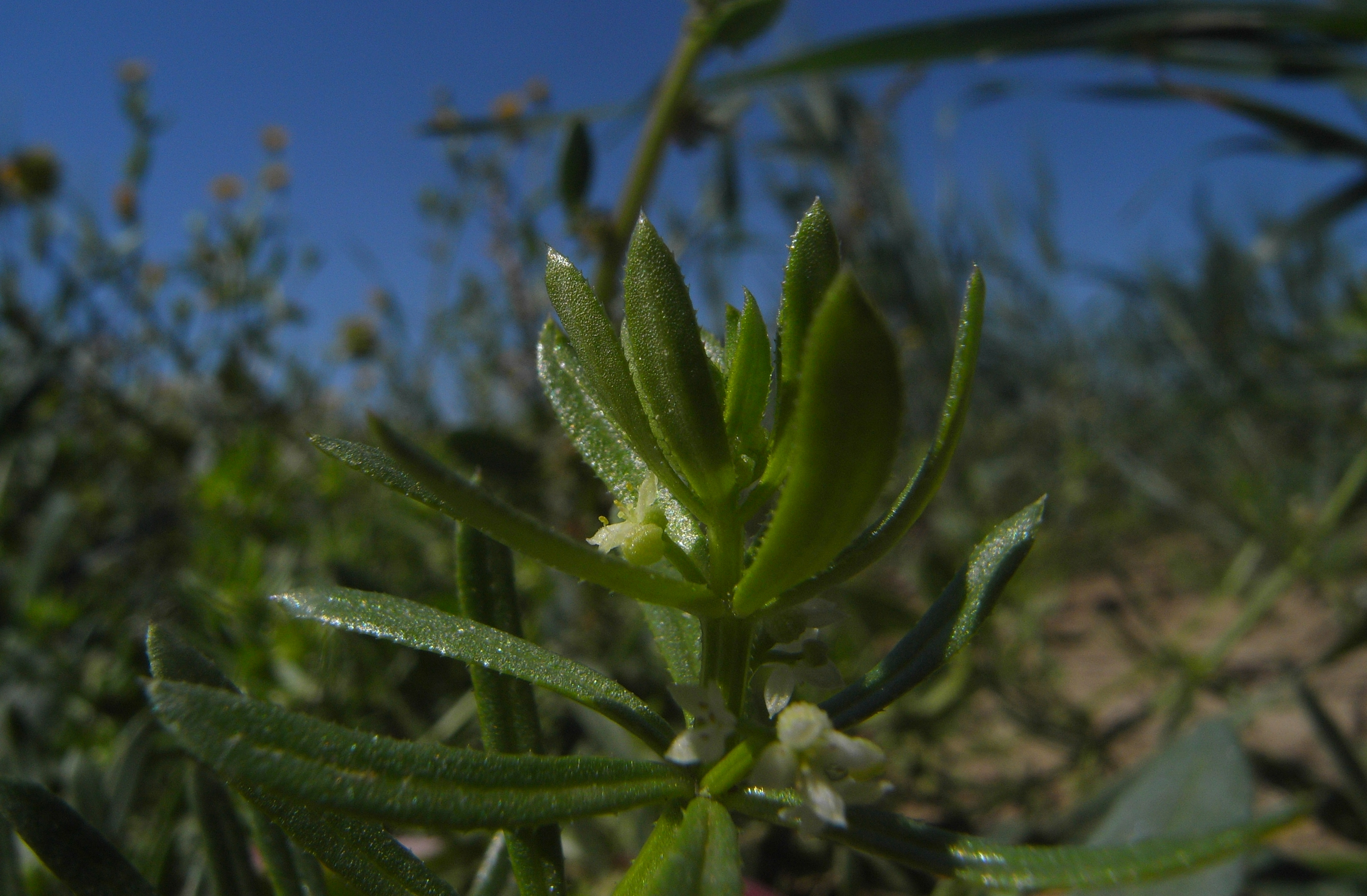

Scientific classification
- Kingdom: Plantae
- Clade: Tracheophytes
- Clade: Angiosperms
- Clade: Eudicots
- Clade: Asterids
- Order: Gentianales
- Family: Rubiaceae
- Genus: Galium
- Species: G. verrucosum

Binomial name
- Galium verrucosum Huds.

Synonyms
- Aparine tricornis Fourr.; Valantia aparine L.; Galium valantia Weber in F.H.Wiggers; Galium tricorne Stokes in W.Withering; Valantia mammifera H.Teton.; Aparine verrucosa (Huds.) Moench; Valantia tricornis Roth; Rubia tricornis Baill.

= Galium verrucosum =

Species of flowering plant

Galium verrucosum, common name warty bedstraw (US) or southern cleavers (UK), is a species of plants in the Rubiaceae. The epithet "verrucosum" means "warty" in reference to the numerous bumps on the mature fruit. It is native to the Mediterranean Basin from Portugal and Morocco to Turkey and Palestine. It is reportedly naturalized in Great Britain, Central Europe (from Switzerland to Poland), the Canary Islands, Madeira, and Wayne County (Michigan).
