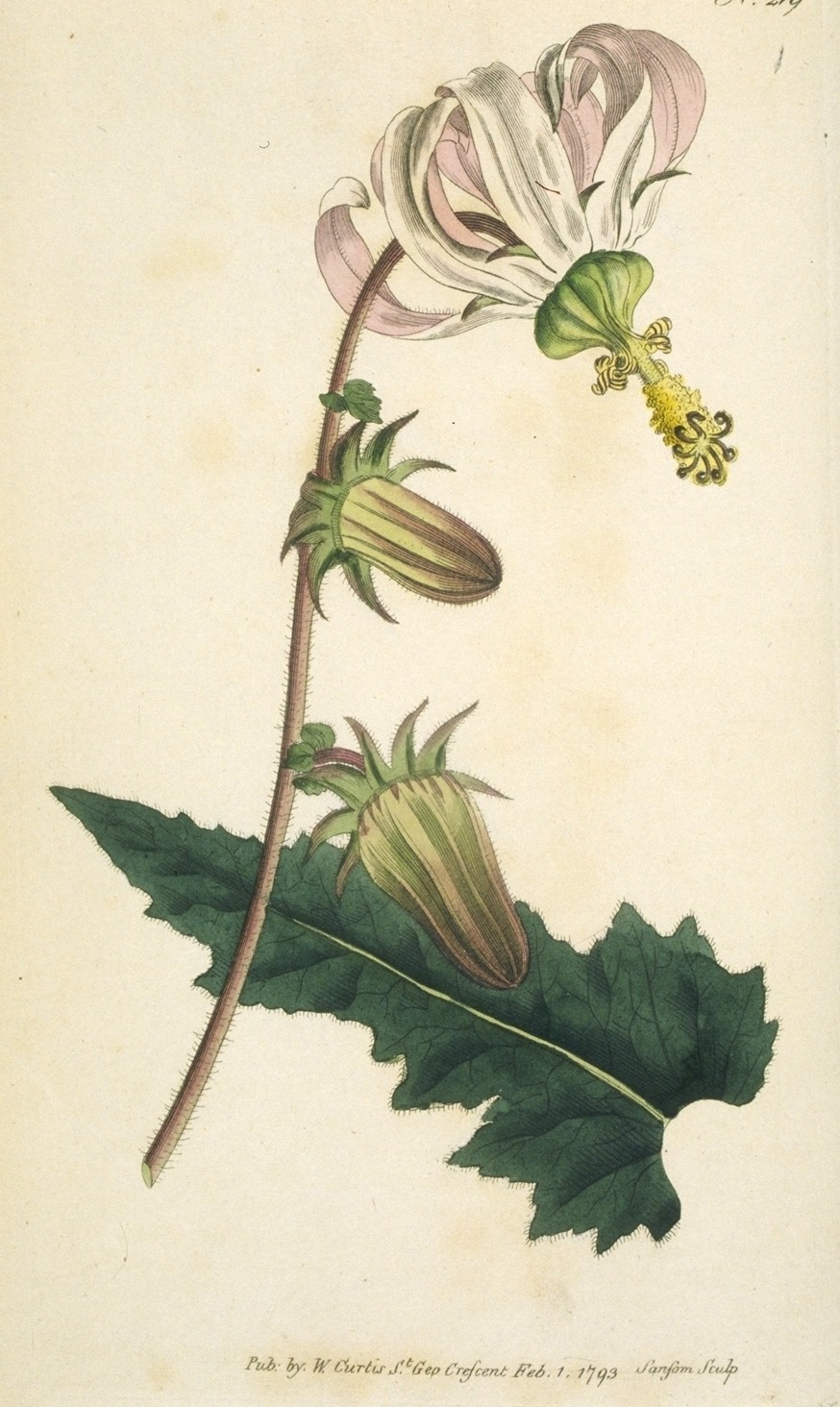
- 1793 illustration

Scientific classification
- Kingdom: Plantae
- Clade: Tracheophytes
- Clade: Angiosperms
- Clade: Eudicots
- Clade: Asterids
- Order: Asterales
- Family: Campanulaceae
- Genus: Michauxia
- Species: M. campanuloides

Binomial name
- Michauxia campanuloides L'Hér. ex Aiton

Synonyms
- Mindium rhazis Juss.; Mindium spicatum J.F.Gmel.; Michauxia strigosa Pers.; Mindium campanuloides (L'Hér.) Rech.f. & Schiman-Czeika; Michauxia nova J.F.Gmel. not validly published; Campanula lyrifolia Salisb.; Mindium isauricum Contandr., Quézel & Pamukç.

= Michauxia campanuloides =

Rough-leaved michauxia

Species of flowering plant

Michauxia campanuloides, the rough-leaved michauxia, is an ornamental plant in the Campanulaceae (bellflower) family. It is native to Greece, Turkey, Syria, Lebanon, Israel.

== Description ==
From rosettes of basal lanceolate and lobed leaves arise flowering stems up to 2 m high, branched towards the top carrying many drooping flowers of white, tinged with purple, with 8-10 long narrow reflexed lobes and long-projecting style. Flowers April–July.

== Habitat ==
Stony and rocky places.

== Gallery ==
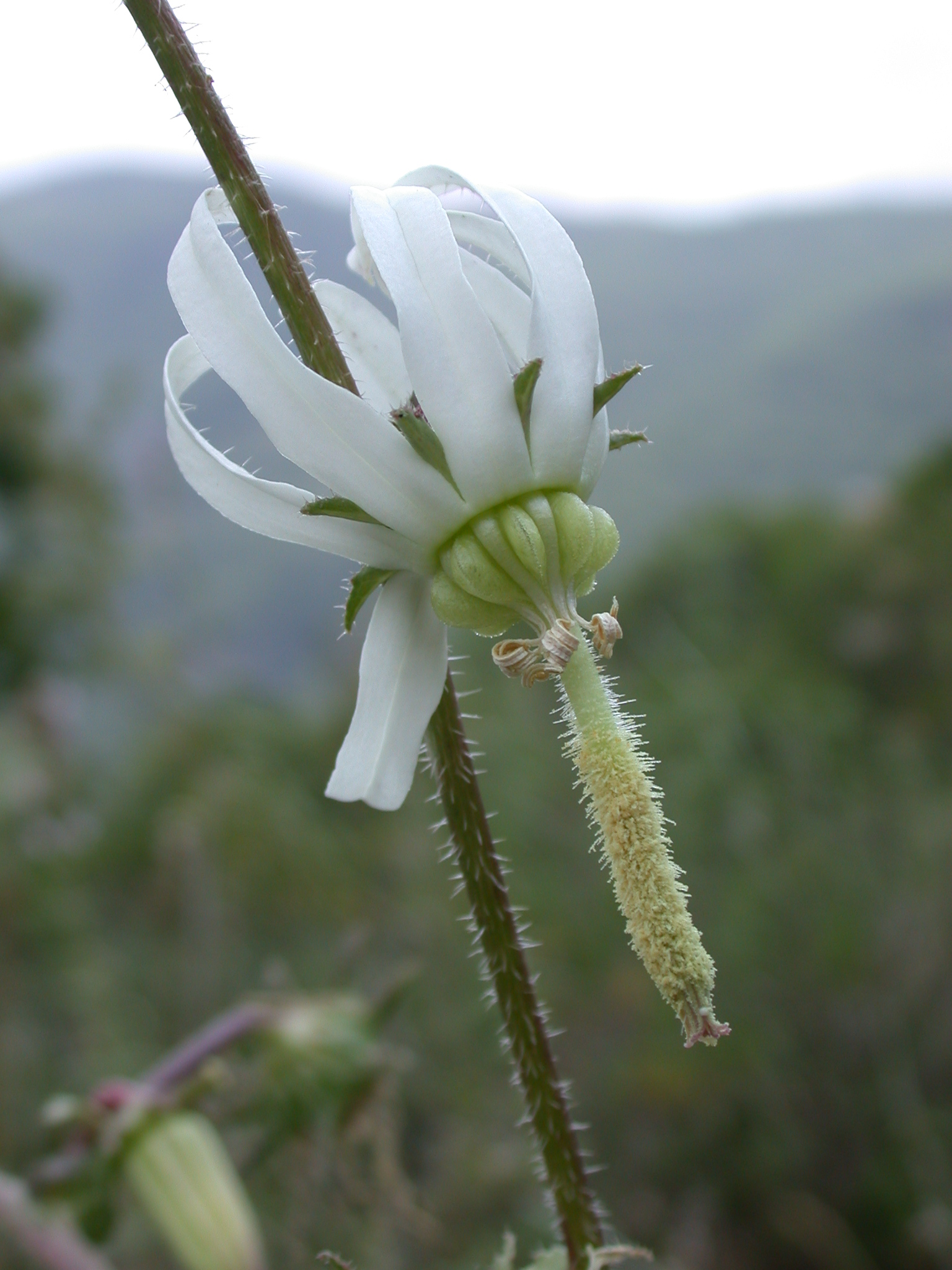

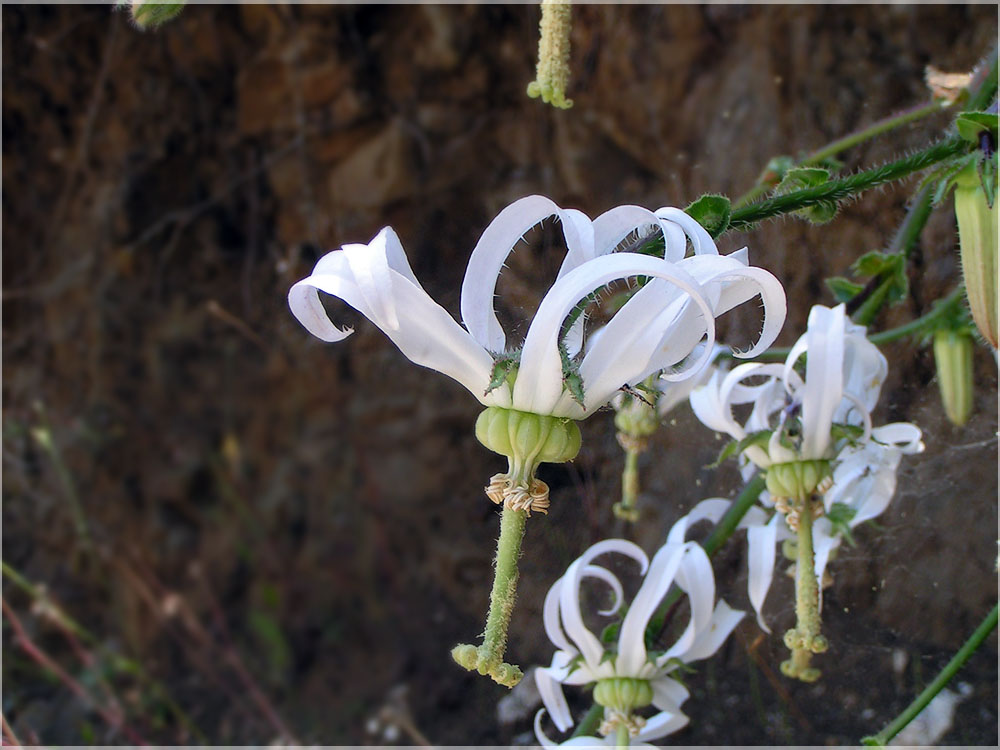

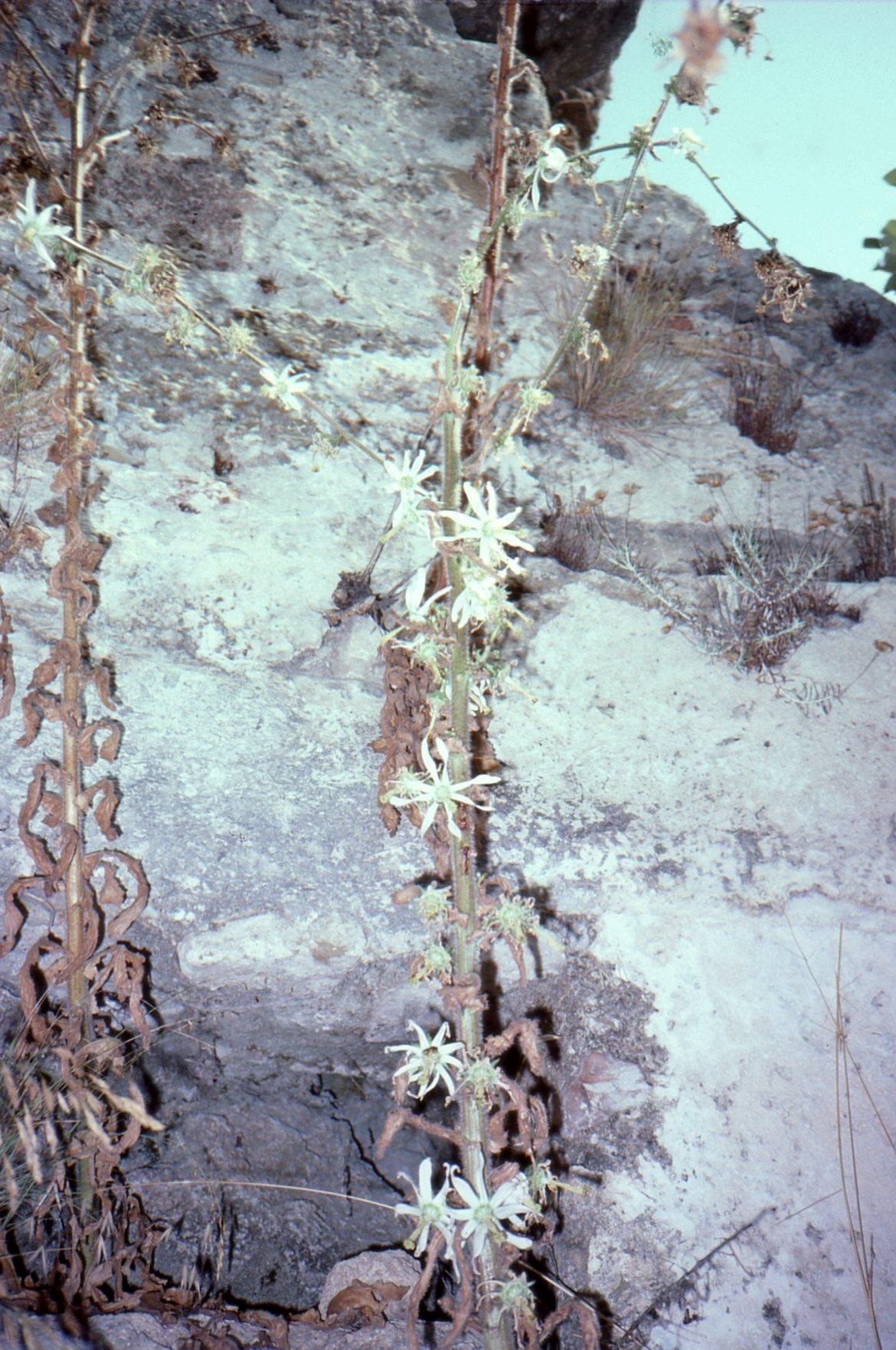

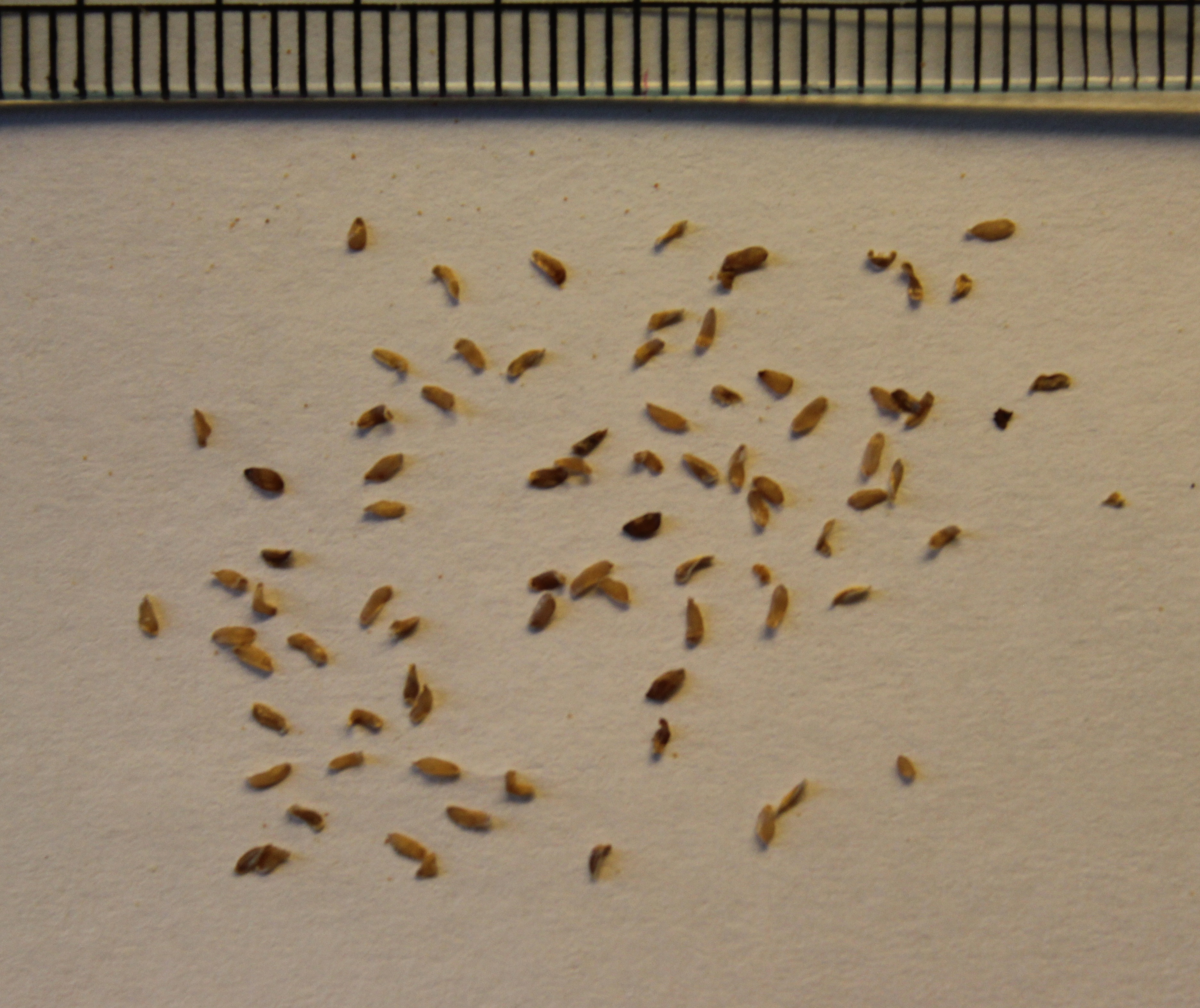
Seeds
