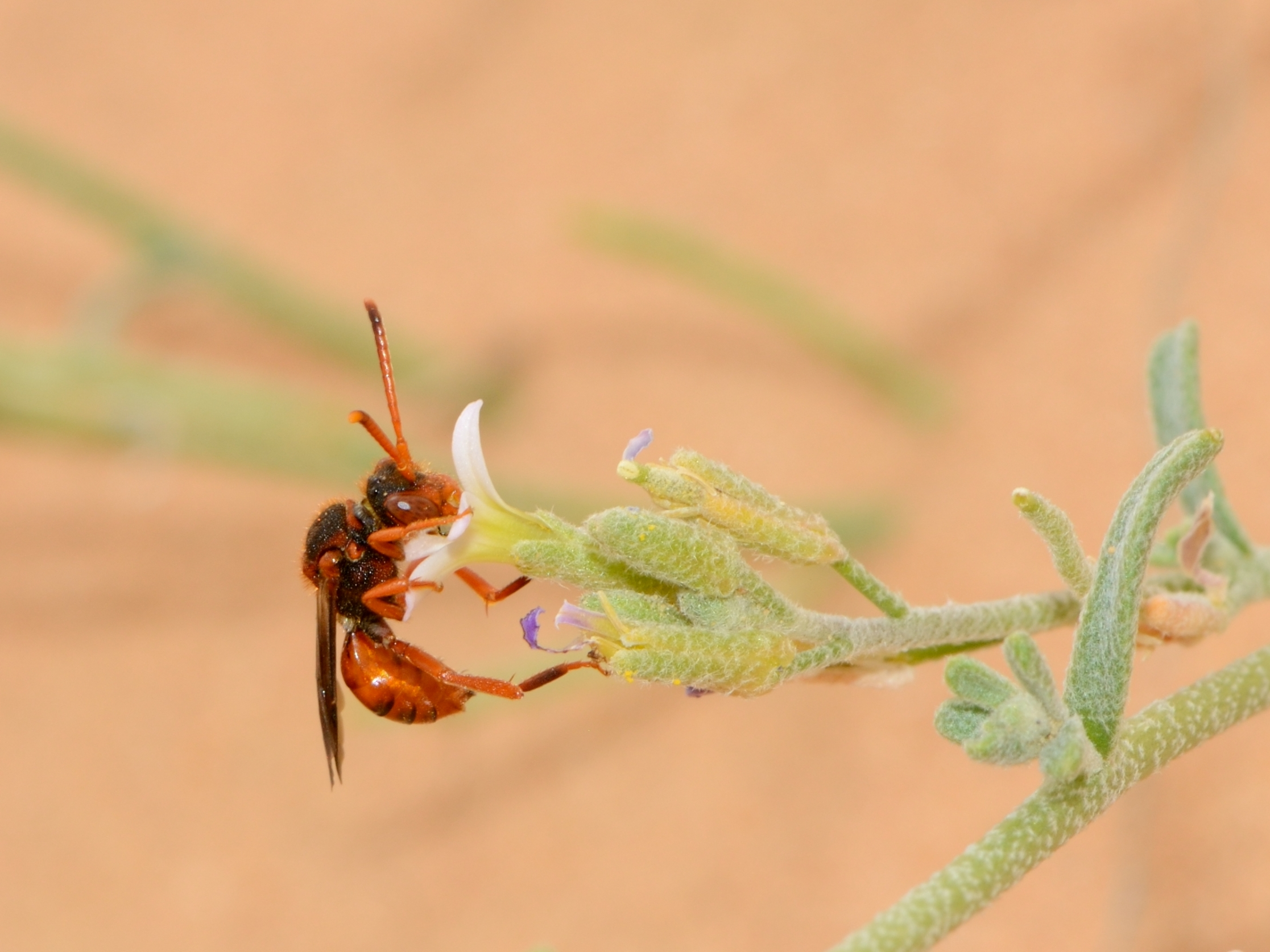
- cuckoo bee (Nomada fenestrata) nectar foraging on Eremobium aegyptiacum

Scientific classification
- Kingdom: Plantae
- Clade: Tracheophytes
- Clade: Angiosperms
- Clade: Eudicots
- Clade: Rosids
- Order: Brassicales
- Family: Brassicaceae
- Genus: Eremobium; Boiss.
- Species: E. aegyptiacum

Binomial name
- Eremobium aegyptiacum (Spreng.) Asch. ex Boiss.

Synonyms
- Malcolmia aegyptiaca Spreng.

= Eremobium =

Genus of plants

Eremobium is a genus of flowering plants belonging to the family Brassicaceae. It includes a single species, Eremobium aegyptiacum, which is native to the Sahara Desert of northern Africa, the Arabian Peninsula, Sinai Peninsula and southern Levant, Iraq, Iran, and Pakistan.
