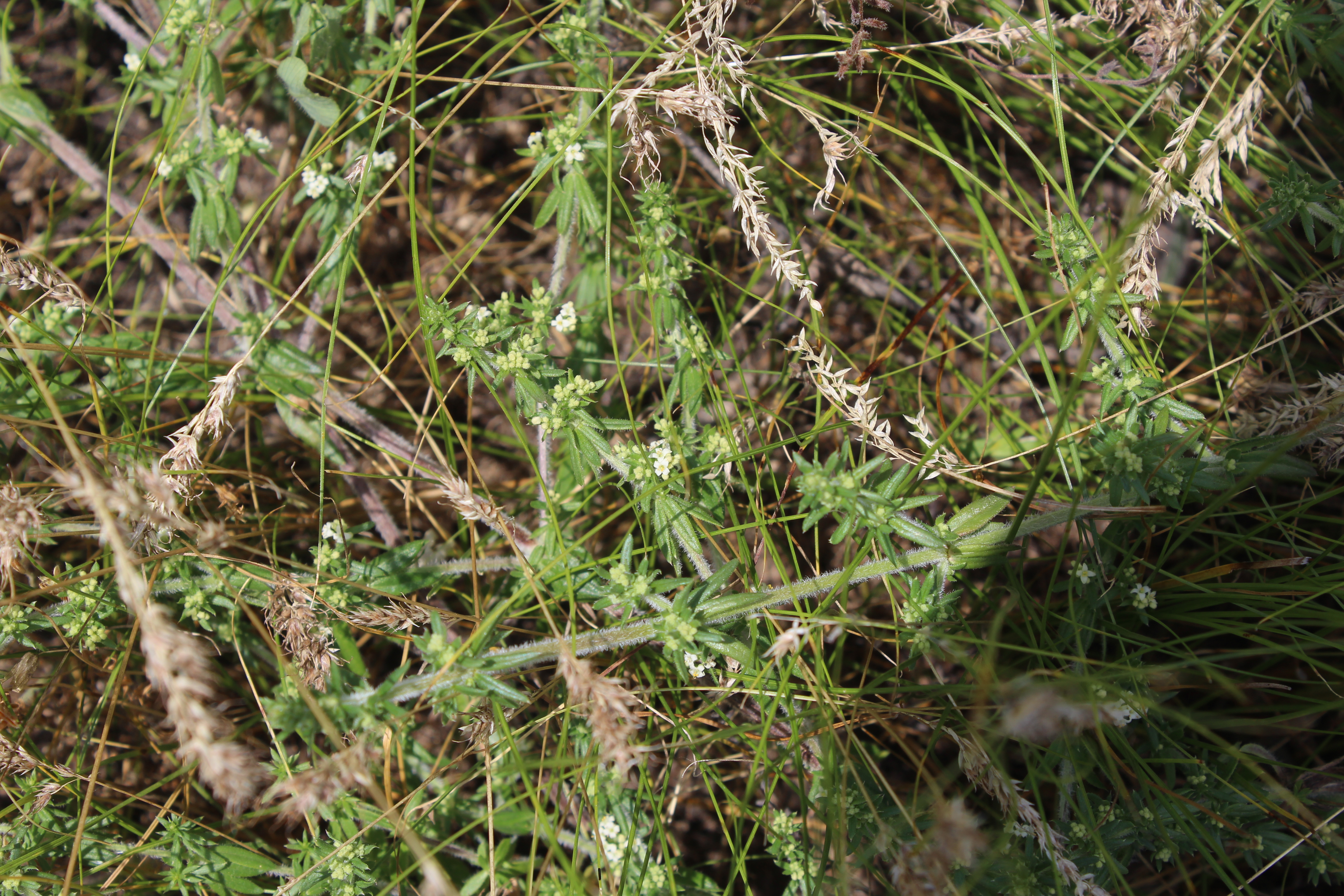

Scientific classification
- Kingdom: Plantae
- Clade: Tracheophytes
- Clade: Angiosperms
- Clade: Eudicots
- Clade: Asterids
- Order: Gentianales
- Family: Rubiaceae
- Genus: Galium
- Species: G. humifusum

Binomial name
- Galium humifusum M.Bieb.

= Galium humifusum =

Species of plant

Galium humifusum, the spreading bedstraw, is a plant species in the Rubiaceae. Its native range stretches from the Black Sea region (Greece, Turkey, Bulgaria, Romania, Ukraine, Belarus, Russia, Caucasus) to Iran, Central Asia, Pakistan, Xinjiang, Mongolia and a few smaller countries. The species has also been regarded as a waif in the wild in Washington state in the United States.
