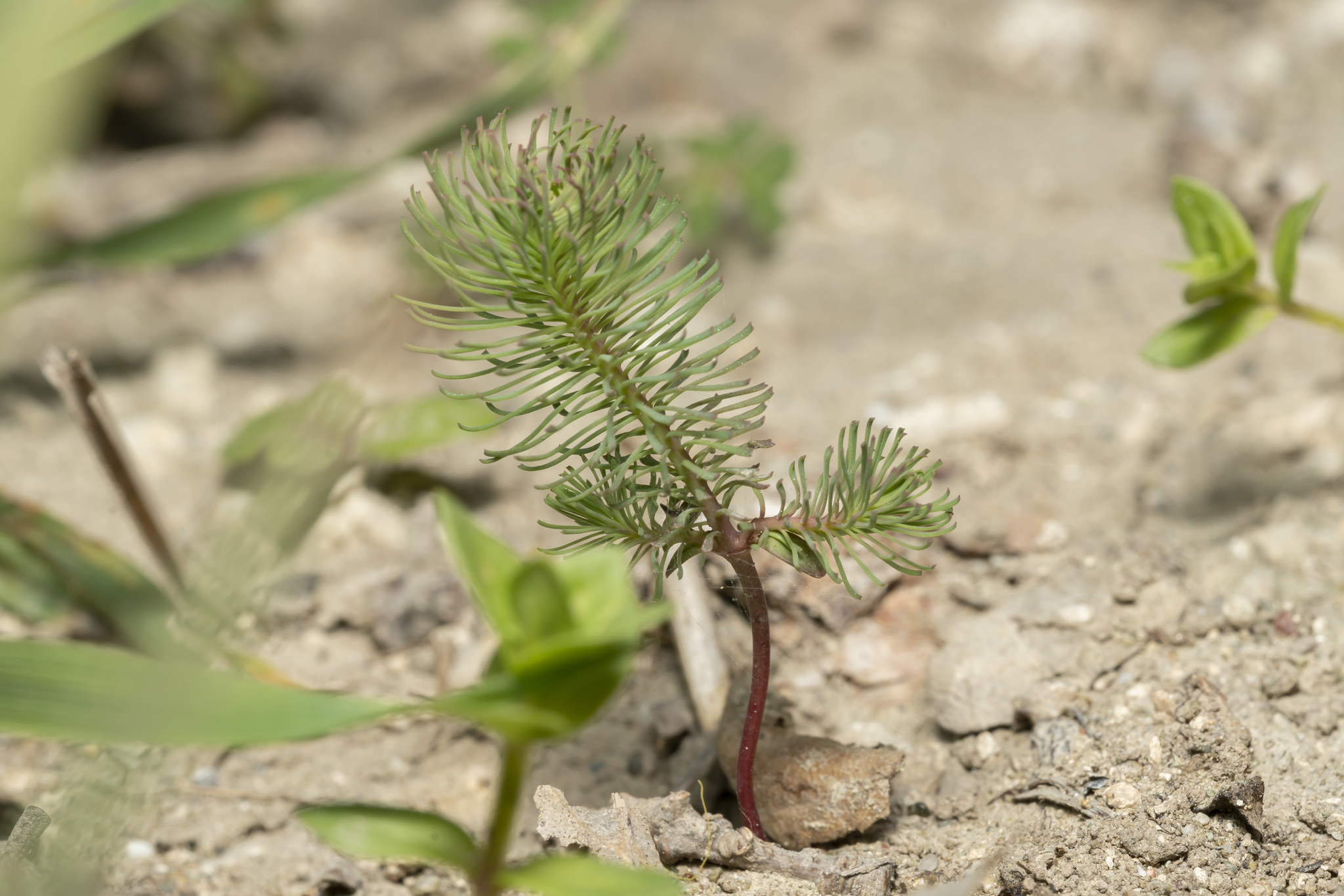
- In Rhodes, Greece

Scientific classification
- Kingdom: Plantae
- Clade: Tracheophytes
- Clade: Angiosperms
- Clade: Eudicots
- Clade: Rosids
- Order: Malpighiales
- Family: Euphorbiaceae
- Genus: Euphorbia
- Species: E. aleppica

Binomial name
- Euphorbia aleppica L., 1753

Synonyms
- Tithymalus connata Raf. Tithymalus aleppicus (L.) Klotzsch & Garcke; Galarhoeus junceus (Aiton) Haw. Galarhoeus aleppicus (L.) Haw. Euphorbia pinifolia Willd. Euphorbia juncoides (Haw.) Sweet; Euphorbia juncea Aiton; Euphorbia condensata Fisch. ex M.Bieb. Euphorbia aleppica var. prostrata Esula juncoides Haw. Esula aleppica (L.) Fourr.

= Euphorbia aleppica =

Species of flowering plant

Euphorbia aleppica is a species of plant in the family Euphorbiaceae.
