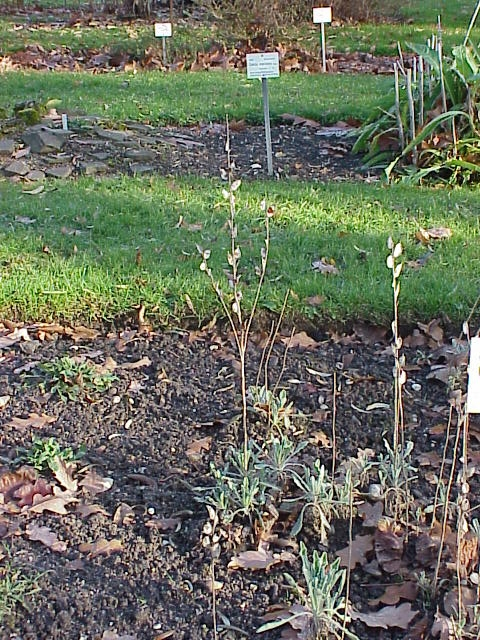

Scientific classification
- Kingdom: Plantae
- Clade: Tracheophytes
- Clade: Angiosperms
- Clade: Eudicots
- Clade: Rosids
- Order: Brassicales
- Family: Brassicaceae
- Genus: Fibigia
- Species: F. clypeata

Binomial name
- Fibigia clypeata (L.) Medik.

Synonyms
- Synonymy: Adyseton petalodes G.Don; Alyssum cheiranthifolium Willd.; Alyssum clypeatum L.; Draba clypeata (L.) Lam.; Farsetia cheiranthifolia (Willd.) Desv.; Farsetia clypeata (L.) R.Br.; Farsetia eriocarpa Boiss.; Farsetia obovata Boiss. & Kotschy; Farsetia rostrata Schenk; Fibigia eriocarpa Boiss.; Fibigia obovata Boiss.; Fibigia rostrata (Schenk) Boiss.; Lunaria canescens Willd.; Lunaria clypeata (L.) All.

= Fibigia clypeata =

Species of plant

Fibigia clypeata is an Asian species of flowering plant of the genus Fibigia in the family Brassicaceae. It is distributed throughout Greece, Iran, Jordan, Lebanon, Palestine, Syria and Turkey, where it flowers between February and April.

This plant is found in abundance and is native to the Shouf Biosphere Reserve in Lebanon. Its common Arabic name is بتلة كالمرساة. Its common English name is False-gypsophila ankyropetalum. Its common French name is Ankyropetale fausse- gypsophylle.

It is a drought-tolerant perennial suitable for xeriscaping.

== Subdivisions ==
Three subdivisions – two subspecies and one variety – are accepted.

- Fibigia clypeata subsp. anatolica A.Duran & Tuștaș
- Fibigia clypeata subsp. clypeata
- Fibigia clypeata var. eriocarpa (DC.) J.Thiébaut

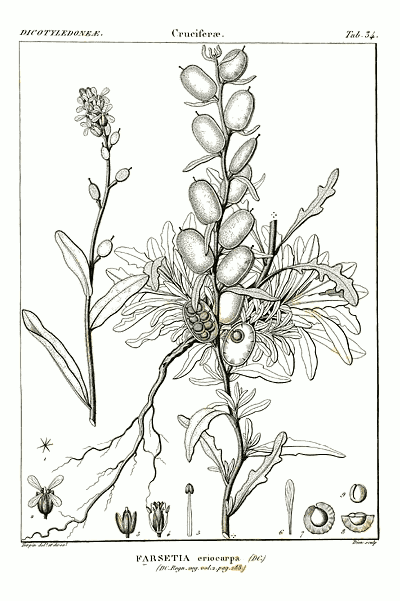
Fibigia clypeata var. eriocarpa
