= Lathyrism (disambiguation) =

Lathyrism is a class of neurological disease of humans.

Lathyrism may also refer to:

== Forms of lathyrism ==
- Neurolathyrism, caused by consumption of certain legumes of the genus Lathyrus.
- Angiolathyrism, caused by consumption of Lathyrus sativus.
- Osteolathyrism, sometimes referred to as odoratism, caused by consumption of Lathyrus odoratus seeds (sweet peas).
