= Angiolathyrism =

- Specialty: Neurology
- Symptoms: Weakness, fatigue, paralysis of the legs, atrophy of leg muscles
- Usual onset: Gradual
- Duration: Permanent
- Types: Neurolathyrism
- Diagnostic method: Based on symptoms and diet
- Frequency: Rare

Angiolathyrism is a form of lathyrism disease. It is mainly caused the consumption of Lathyrus sativus (also known as grass pea) and to a lesser degree by Lathyrus cicera, Lathyrus ochrus and Lathyrus clymenum containing the toxin ODAP. The main chemical responsible is β-Aminopropionitrile, which prevents collagen cross-linking, thus making the blood vessel, especially the tunica media, weak. This can result in Cystic medial necrosis or a picture similar to Marfan syndrome. The damaged vessels are at an increased risk of dissection.

Unlike osteolathyrism, the blood vessels are affected instead of bone. However it is caused by similar action and is typically associated with the other forms of lathyrism.
