= Perdur Radhakantha Adiga =

Indian biologist

- Born: 5 May 1935; Barkur, Udupi district, Karnataka, India
- Died: 13 September 2006 (aged 71); Karnataka, India
- Education: University of Kerala; Indian Institute of Science
- Known for: Studies on vitamin-carrier proteins and Lathyrus sativus
- Awards: 1963 IISc Giri Memorial Award; 1980 Shanti Swarup Bhatnagar Prize; 1982 Sanjay Gandhi Award for Science and Technology; 1984 SBCI Professor M. Srinivasayya Award
- Scientific career
- Fields: Endocrine biochemistry; Reproductive biology
- Workplaces: Indian Institute of Science
- Doctoral advisor: P. S. Sarma

Perdur Radhakantha Adiga (5 May 1935 – 13 September 2006) was an Indian endocrine biochemist, reproductive biologist, INSA Senior Scientist and an Astra chair professor of the Indian Institute of Science. He was known for his researches on vitamin-carrier proteins and Lathyrus sativus and was an elected fellow of the Indian Academy of Sciences and the Indian National Science Academy. (Note: Long link - please click on name to see details) The Council of Scientific and Industrial Research, the apex agency of the Government of India for scientific research, awarded him the Shanti Swarup Bhatnagar Prize for Science and Technology, one of the highest Indian science awards for his contributions to Medical Sciences in 1980. (Note: Long link - please select award year to see details)

== Biography ==
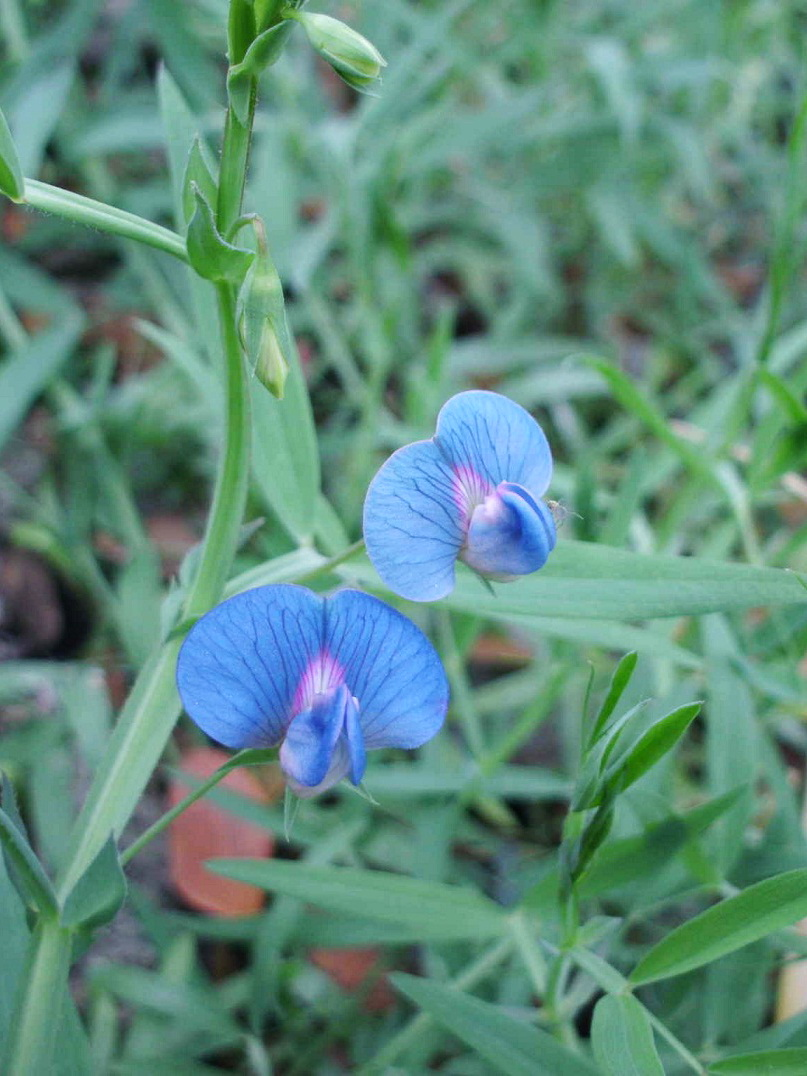
Grass pea

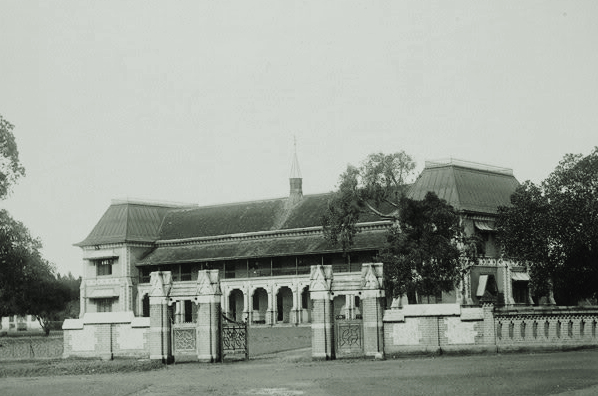
Kerala University in 1940s

P. R. Adiga, born on 5 May 1935 at Barkur, a small hamlet in Udupi district of the south Indian state of Karnataka as one among the ten children of his parents, did his early schooling at local schools and earned a master's degree in biochemistry from the University of Kerala in the neighboring state. Subsequently, he joined the Indian Institute of Science as a research associate and pursued his doctoral studies under the guidance of P. S. Sarma, who headed the department of biochemistry, to secure the degree in 1963. He spent his entire career at IISc, holding various positions as that of an assistant professor, associate professor and professor. He also chaired the erstwhile Centre for Reproductive Biology and Molecular Endocrinology (Note: present-day Department of Molecular Reproduction, Development and Genetics) at the institute. Post retirement, he continued his association with IISc as an INSA Senior scientist.

Adiga's early researches were focused on the growth and intermediary metabolism of fungi and insects and how they were impacted by the trace elements and metal toxicity. His work on Lathyrus sativus, commonly known as grass pea, revealed that N-oxalyl-diaminopropionic acid, a neurotoxin present in the plant caused the neurological disorder of neurolathyrism in humans. He was also credited with the discovery of Homoarginine, an amino acid derivative, found in Lathyrus sativus. Later, he worked on vitamin-carrying proteins which demonstrated how the proteins carried vitamins such as thiamin and riboflavin to the foetus and his experiments on rodents showed antibodies generated during pregnancy might cause its termination. He documented his researches by way of several articles in peer-reviewed journals (Note: Please see Selected bibliography section) and the online article repository of the Indian Academy of Sciences has listed 192 of them. He edited the book, Perspectives in Primate Reproductive Biology and contributed chapters to many books published by others; his work has been cited by a number of authors and researchers. He was also associated with two journals, Journal of Biosciences and Molecular and Cellular Endocrinology as a member of their editorial boards.

Adiga died on 13 September 2006, at the age of 71, survived by his wife and two daughters.

== Awards and honors ==
Adiga won the Giri Memorial Medal of the Indian Institute of Science in 1963, for his PhD thesis. The Council of Scientific and Industrial Research awarded him Shanti Swarup Bhatnagar Prize, one of the highest Indian science awards, in 1980. Two years later, he received the Sanjay Gandhi Award for Science and Technology, the same year that he was elected as a fellow to the Indian Academy of Sciences. The Society of Biological Chemists (India) awarded him the Professor M. Srinivasayya Award in 1984 and the Indian National Science Academy elected him as a fellow the same year. His award orations include the Professor M. R. N. Prasad Memorial lecture of the Indian National Science Academy in 1992.

== Selected bibliography ==
=== Chapters ===
- International Plant Genetic Resources Institute Staff (1 December 1999). Lathyrus Genetic Resources Network. Bioversity International. pp. 63–. ISBN 978-92-9043-394-1.
- CIBA Foundation Symposium (14 September 2009). Molecular Biology of Egg Maturation. John Wiley & Sons. pp. 130–. ISBN 978-0-470-71849-0.
- Satish Kumar Gupta (6 December 2012). Reproductive Immunology. Springer Science & Business Media. pp. 344–. ISBN 978-94-011-4197-0.
- Arthur W. Galston; T.A. Smith; P. R. Adiga, G. L. Prasad (6 December 2012). "Biosynthesis and regulation of polyamines in higher plants". Polyamines in Plants. Springer Science & Business Media. ISBN 978-94-009-5171-6.

=== Articles ===
- Rao Saligame; L. K. Ramachandran; P. R. Adiga (1963). "The Isolation and Characterization of L-Homoarginine from Seeds of Lathyrus sativus". Biochemistry. 2 (2): 298–300. doi:10.1021/bi00902a019. PMID 13973060.
- K. Sivarama Sastry; Padmanaban Govindarajan; P. R. Adiga; P. S. Sarma (1963). "A sensitive microbiological assay procedure for determining magnesium in biological materials". The Analyst. 88 (1048): 534. Bibcode:1963Ana....88..534S. doi:10.1039/an9638800534.
- P. R. Adiga; P. S. Sarma; Rao Saligame (1964). "The Isolation and Characterization of β-N-Oxalyl-L-α,β-Diaminopropionic Acid: A Neurotoxin from the Seeds of Lathyrus sativus". Biochemistry. 3 (3): 432–6. doi:10.1021/bi00891a022. PMID 14155110.
- P. R. Adiga; P. S. Sarma (1970). "Cysteine toxicity in Neurospora crassa: comparison of counteraction by sulphur amino acids and iron". Indian Journal of Biochemistry. 7 (3): 141–4. PMID 4252565.
- P. R. Adiga; P. S. Sarma (1970). "The influence of ribonucleic acid & some of its structural constituents on metal toxicities in Corcyra cephalonica St". Indian Journal of Biochemistry. 7 (2): 130–2. PMID 4248650.

== See also ==
- Nuggehalli Raghuveer Moudgal
