= Lathyrism =

Medical condition caused by eating certain legumes of the genus Lathyrus

- Specialty: Toxicology
- Symptoms: Weakness, fatigue, paralysis of the legs, atrophy of leg muscles, and skeletal deformities
- Usual onset: Gradual
- Duration: Permanent
- Types: Neurolathyrism; Osteolathyrism; Angiolathyrism
- Causes: Overconsumption of legumes containing ODAP (neurolathyrism) or beta-aminopropionitrile (angio- and osteolathyrism)
- Diagnostic method: Based on symptoms and diet
- Treatment: Supportive care
- Frequency: Rare

Lathyrism is a condition caused by eating certain legumes of the genus Lathyrus. There are three types of lathyrism: neurolathyrism, osteolathyrism, and angiolathyrism, all of which are incurable, differing in their symptoms and in the body tissues affected.

Neurolathyrism is the type associated with the consumption of legumes in the genus Lathyrus that contain the toxin oxalyldiaminopropionic acid (ODAP). ODAP ingestion results in motor neuron death. The result is paralysis and muscle atrophy of the lower limbs. Osteolathyrism, a different type of lathyrism, affects the connective tissues, not the motor neurons. Osteolathyrism results from the ingestion of Lathyrus odoratus seeds (sweet peas), and is often referred to as odoratism. It is caused by a different toxin, beta-aminopropionitrile, which affects the linking of the subunits of collagen, a major structural protein found in connective tissue. A third type of lathyrism is angiolathyrism, which is similar to osteolathyrism in its mechanism, employing the toxin beta-aminopropionitrile. The blood vessels are affected, as opposed to bone.

== Types ==
=== Neurolathyrism ===
Neurolathyrism is caused by the consumption of large quantities of Lathyrus grain, specifically the grains in the genus that contain the glutamate analogue neurotoxin ODAP (also known as β-N-oxalyl-amino-L-alanine, or BOAA). Lathyrus sativus (also known as grass pea, chickling pea, kesari dal, or almorta) and to a lesser degree with Lathyrus cicera, Lathyrus ochrus and Lathyrus clymenum

=== Osteolathyrism ===
Osteolathyrism affects the bones and connecting tissues, instead of the nervous system. It is a skeletal disorder. It is caused by the toxin BAPN, which inhibits the copper-containing enzyme lysyl oxidase, responsible for cross-linking tropocollagen and proelastin. BAPN is also a metabolic product of a compound present in the sprouted seeds of grasspea, pea and lentil.

=== Angiolathyrism ===
Angiolathyrism affects the collagen in blood capillaries. It is also caused by the toxin beta-aminopropionitrile.

== Prevention ==
Eating the grasspea with legumes having high concentrations of sulphur-based amino acids reduces the risk of lathyrism if such grain is available. Some states in India have banned the sale of Lathyrus seed in order to prevent its consumption, which in turn lessens the possibility of lathyrism in the general population.

== History ==
The first mentioned intoxication goes back to ancient India. Hippocrates mentions a neurological disorder in 46 B.C. in Greece caused by Lathyrus seed. Indian medical classic Bhavaprakasha dating from the sixteenth century mentions it, and even its etiology as kesari dal.

During the Spanish War of Independence against Napoleon, grasspea served as a famine food. This was the subject of one of Francisco de Goya's famous aquatint prints titled Gracias a la Almorta ("Thanks to the Grasspea"), depicting poor people surviving on a porridge made from grasspea flour, one of them lying on the floor, already crippled by it.

During the Second World War, on the order of Colonel I. Murgescu, commandant of the Vapniarka concentration camp in Transnistria, the detainees – most of them Jews – were fed nearly exclusively with grasspea. Consequently, they became ill from lathyrism.

== Related conditions ==
Disorders that are clinically similar are konzo and Lytico-bodig disease. Konzo means "tied legs" in the Yaka language, and is common in some African people in central and eastern parts of the continent who are consuming diets poor in protein. The possible molecule causing this problem is thiocyanate, which stimulates AMPA receptors.
