= Benzoylhydrazine =

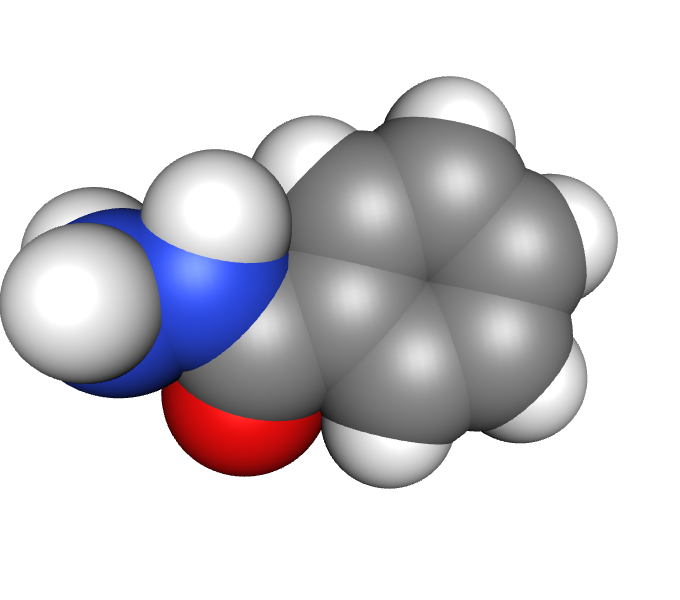

Names
- Systematic IUPAC name benzohydrazide

Identifiers
| CAS Number | 613-94-5 |
| 3D model (JSmol) | Interactive image |
| Beilstein Reference | 471797 |
| ChEBI | CHEBI:38454 |
| ChEMBL | ChEMBL125369 |
| ChemSpider | 11461 |
| ECHA InfoCard | 100.009.423 |
| EC Number | 210-363-9 |
| Gmelin Reference | 68991 |
| PubChem CID | 11955 |
| UNII | LLW11ZWZ20 |
| CompTox Dashboard (EPA) | DTXSID6020149 |
- InChI: InChI=1S/C7H8N2O/c8-9-7(10)6-4-2-1-3-5-6/h1-5H,8H2,(H,9,10) Key: WARCRYXKINZHGQ-UHFFFAOYSA-N
- SMILES: C1=CC=C(C=C1)P

Properties
| Chemical formula | C_{7}H_{8}N_{2}O |
| Molar mass | 136.154 g·mol^{−1} |
| Appearance | white solid |
| Melting point | 112–117 °C (234–243 °F; 385–390 K) |
| Boiling point | 267 °C (513 °F; 540 K) |
| Solubility in water | soluble |
| Solubility | soluble in alcohol slightly soluble in ether, acetone, chloroform |

Hazards
- GHS labelling
| Pictograms | (GHS06: Toxic) (GHS07: Exclamation mark) (GHS08: Health hazard) |
| Signal word | Danger |
| Hazard statements | H301, H315, H319, H335 |
| Precautionary statements | P203, P261, P264, P264+P265, P270, P271, P280, P301+P316, P302+P352, P304+P340, P305+P351+P338, P318, P319, P321, P330, P332+P317, P337+P317, P362+P364, P403+P233, P405, P501 |
- Lethal dose or concentration (LD, LC)
| LD_{50} (median dose) | 122 mg/kg (mouse, subcutaneous/intraperitoneal) |
| LD_{Lo} (lowest published) | 102 mg/kg (rabbit, subcutaneous) 100 mg/kg (rat, intraperitoneal) |
- Except where otherwise noted, data are given for materials in their standard state (at 25 °C [77 °F], 100 kPa). Infobox references

Benzoylhydrazine, also known as benzenecarbohydrazide, or benzoic hydrazide is an organic chemical compound, which is a hydrazide functionally linked to benzoic acid. It is typically used as a precursor in pharmaceutical and chemical synthesis, or used as a chemical intermediate for the production of hydrazine-based products.

== Metabolism ==
During metabolism it forms metabolites including hydrazine, benzoic acid and hippuric acid.

== Safety ==
It is both neurotoxic and hepatoxic as well as an osteolathyrogen and carcinogen, and also a potential teratogen that affects the development of fetal abnormalities.

The mechanism responsible for the development of osteolathyrism is identical to the reference osteolathyrogen β-aminopropionitrile.

A violent reaction occurs with benzeneselenic acid. When heated to decomposition it emits toxic fumes of nitrogen oxides.
