= Osteolathyrism =

Collagen cross-linking deficiency

- Other names: Odoratism, Lathyrism
- Specialty: Rheumatology
- Symptoms: skeletal deformities, bone pain
- Duration: Permanent
- Causes: Over consumption of Lathyrus sativus
- Frequency: Rare

Osteolathyrism, sometimes referred to as odoratism, is a form of the disease Lathyrism. The disease results from the ingestion of Lathyrus odoratus seeds (sweet peas). The toxin found in the sweet peas is (beta-aminopropionitrile), which affects the linking of collagen, a protein of connective tissues. The condition results in damage to bone and mesenchymal connective tissues. Osteolathyrism occurs in people in combination with neurolathyrism and angiolathyrism in areas where famine demands reliance on a crop with known detrimental effects. It occurs in cattle and horses with diets overreliant upon the grass pea. Prominent symptoms include skeletal deformities and bone pain.

== Signs and symptoms ==
- Bone pain
- Skeletal deformity
- Fatigue
- Malnourishment

== Cause ==
Aside from L. odoratus, other members of the genus are also known to cause the disease, including L. sylvestris, L. cicera, and L. clymenum. L. odoratus grows well under famine conditions, often severe drought, where it is cultivated. These legumes carry a variety of osteolathyrogenic compounds, specifically excitatory amino-compounds. The most widely studied of these compounds is beta-aminopropionitrile (BAPN), which exerts its deleterious effect by an unknown yet potently irreversible mechanism. Other instigators are ureides, semicarbazides and thiosemicarbazides, which are believed to chelate the prosthetic Cu(II)-bipyridine cofactor complex in the enzyme lysyl oxidase.

Lysyl oxidase is an important enzyme for the creation of crosslinks between collagen triple-helices in connective tissue. By oxidizing the terminal amino group of lysine, an aldehyde is created. This aldehyde can undergo several reactions with neighboring aldehydes or amines to create strong covalent cross-links between collagen tertiary structures in bone and cartilage. The main product of these reactions is the aldimine compound dehydrohydroxylysinonorleucine. This unique crosslink can be formed by the Schiff base mechanism in which the lone pair of electrons on a primary amine react with the carbonyl carbon of an aldehyde. Other crosslinks include the formation of an α,β-unsaturated ketone via aldol condensation and hydroxylysinonorleucine.

If these crosslinks are not formed, as in the case of osteolathyrism, the synthesis of strong mesenchymal and mesodermal tissue is inhibited. Symptoms of osteolathyrism include weakness and fragility of connective tissue (i.e., skin, bones, and blood vessels (angiolathyrism) and the paralysis of the lower extremities associated with neurolathyrism. For these reasons, compounds containing lathyrogens should be avoided during pregnancy and growth of a child.

== Prevention ==
Prevention of osteolathyrism can be achieved with a cessation of L. sativus consumption.
