= Haileyesus Getahun =

Ethiopian global health leader

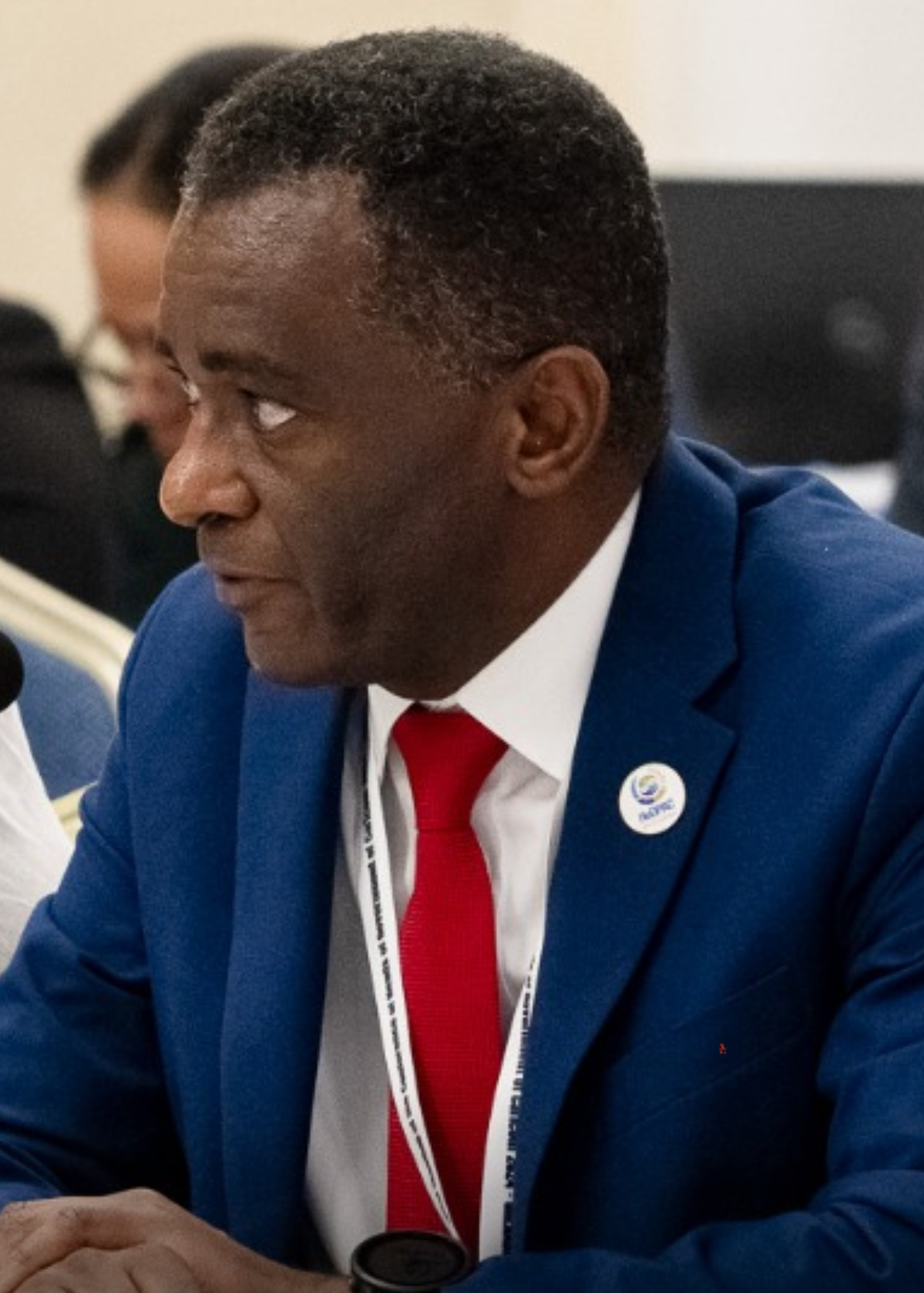
Haileyesus Getahun at the CARICOM Heads of Government meeting in July 2024 in Grenada.

Dr. Haileyesus (Haile) Getahun is an Ethiopian global health leader, researcher, and advocate. He is currently founder and chief executive officer of the Global Center for Health Diplomacy and Inclusion(CeHDI). He also serves as the chief executive officer of HeDPAC, an organization dedicated to strengthening south-to-south partnerships in health development. Before his current roles, he served at the WHO headquarters in Geneva from 2003 to 2024, where he led numerous global health initiatives.

== Early life and education ==
Getahun was born and raised in Addis Ababa, Ethiopia. He graduated from Addis Ababa University Medical Faculty as a medical doctor and obtained a Master's in Public Health degree from the Free University of Brussels and a PhD in epidemiology and public health from the Institute of Tropical Medicine Antwerp and Ghent University, Belgium.

== Public health career in Ethiopia ==
Getahun began his career as a general practitioner at Estie Health Center in the Amhara region of Ethiopia. He conducted numerous operational and implementation research on neurolathyrism, tuberculosis, and reproductive health while managing the health center and later the zonal health programs department in South Gonder. His rural based research work and publications led to him becoming the first recipient of the Young Public Health Researcher award of Ethiopia in 1999.

=== Tuberculosis research and programs ===
Getahun initiated the tuberculosis (TB) club approach, which empowered communities and improved TB control services in the Estie District and other areas of the Amhara region between 1995 and 1998. This initiative was recognized by the WHO as an initiative to engage communities in TB control activities and replicated in countries such as Nicaragua, India, Mongolia, and Mexico.

=== Neurolathyrism Research ===
Getahun was a notable public health researcher in neurolathyrism who investigated and reported the epidemic that occurred in northern Ethiopia in 1997-99. He later conducted a longitudinal ecological study and based on the findings introduced multisectoral measures for the prevention of neurolathyrism involving the health and agriculture sectors.

=== Reproductive and sexual health research ===
Getahun served as a youth program manager and principal investigator at the Family Guidance Association of Ethiopia, where he introduced emergency contraception in eight youth centers across the country.

== Global Health Career at WHO ==
Getahun joined the WHO in 2003 to work on HIV related TB. Over his tenure, he expanded his scope to various public health areas until his appointment as CEO of HeDPAC in April 2024.

=== TB and HIV Work at WHO ===
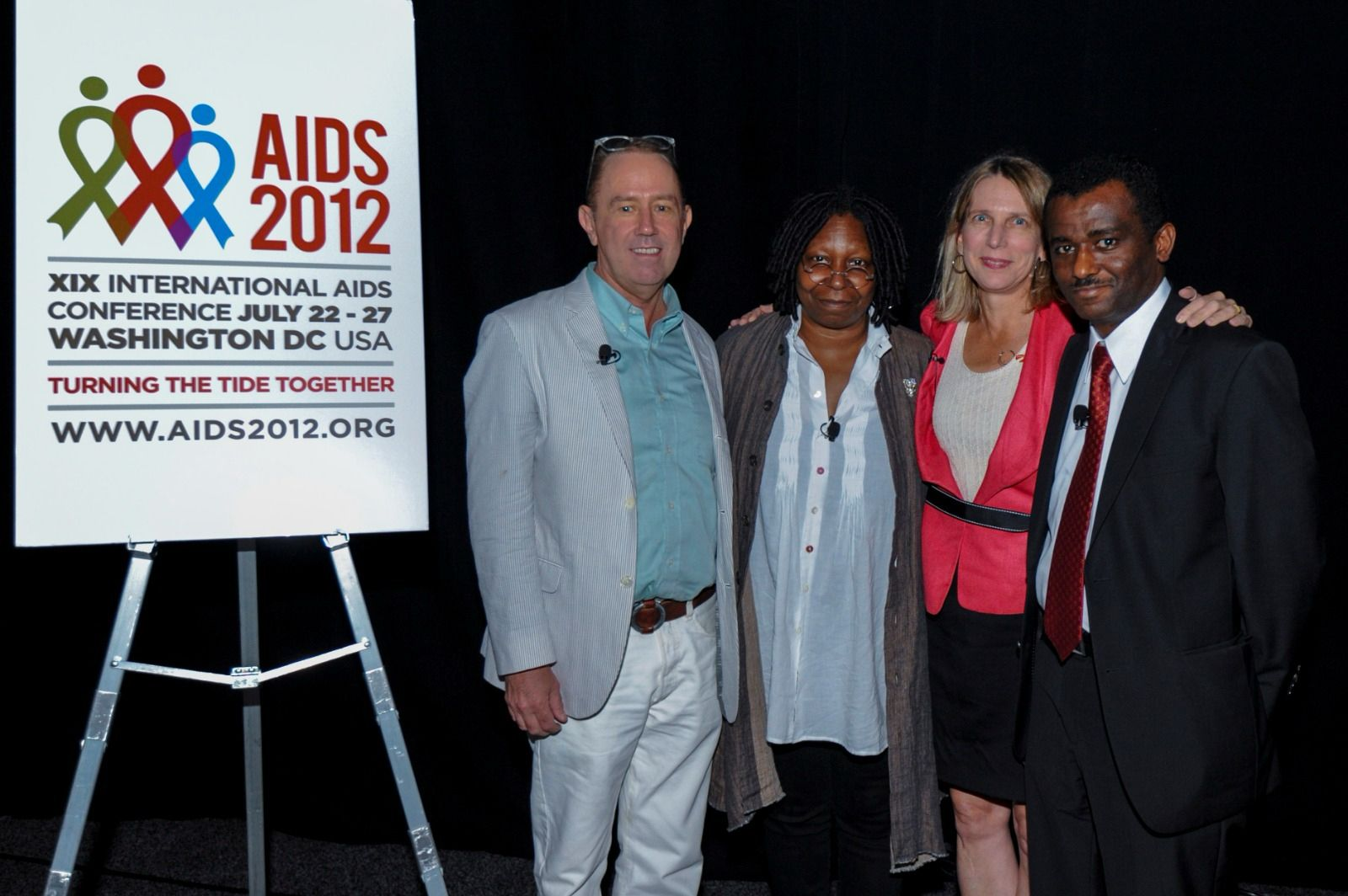
Haileyesus Getahun with Mark Harrington, Whoopie Goldberg and Diane Havlir at the AIDS 2012 Conference.

Getahun led the development of the first interim TB/HIV policy in 2004, resulting in comprehensive guidelines by 2012. The WHO estimated in 2025 that this TB/HIV policy averted 9.8 million deaths of people living with HIV between 2005 (the first year following its release) and 2024. His Lancet publication and work on diagnosing smear-negative TB among HIV-positive individuals had a significant impact on subsequent policy changes and TB care. As the principal investigator of a study published in PLoS Medicine, Getahun's work led to the WHO four-symptom screening for TB, enhancing care for HIV-positive individuals. His publication in the New England Journal of Medicine broadened the focus of TB prevention and led to global policy changes. He collaborated with HIV activist Mark Harrington (HIV/AIDS activist) to introduce and foster patient and community activism in the global TB response, mentoring numerous activists from Africa, Asia and Latin America who became key global advocates. He was awarded the prestigious Union Scientific Prize for his global work on TB and TB/HIV in 2011.

=== Antimicrobial resistance work at WHO ===
Getahun became the director of the UN Interagency Coordinating Group (IACG) Secretariat on Antimicrobial Resistance (AMR), established following the 2016 UN General Assembly Political Declaration on AMR. He was the coordinator of the Secretariat and the lead author of the IACG Report, which was submitted to the UN Secretary General. Getahun was also the founding director of the Quadripartite Joint Secretariat on AMR, facilitating inter-agency coordination among the Food and Agriculture Organization of the United Nations (FAO), the United Nations Environment Programme (UNEP), the World Health Organization (WHO), and the World Organisation for Animal Health (WOAH). He led the establishment of the Global Leaders Group on Antimicrobial Resistance in November 2020 and coordinated its work until April 2024. He also coordinated the establishments the AMR Multi-stakeholder Partnership Platform and the AMR Multi-partner Trust Fund. He long advocated for the inclusion of global targets, accountable governance and financing mechanisms for AMR as part of the political declaration of the 2024 United Nations General Assembly High Level Meeting on AMR. He also advocates for antibiotics to be considered as global public good. He was recognized by European Society of Clinical Microbiology and Infectious Diseases as ESCMID Fellow for his work on Antimicrobial Resistance

== Post-WHO Career ==
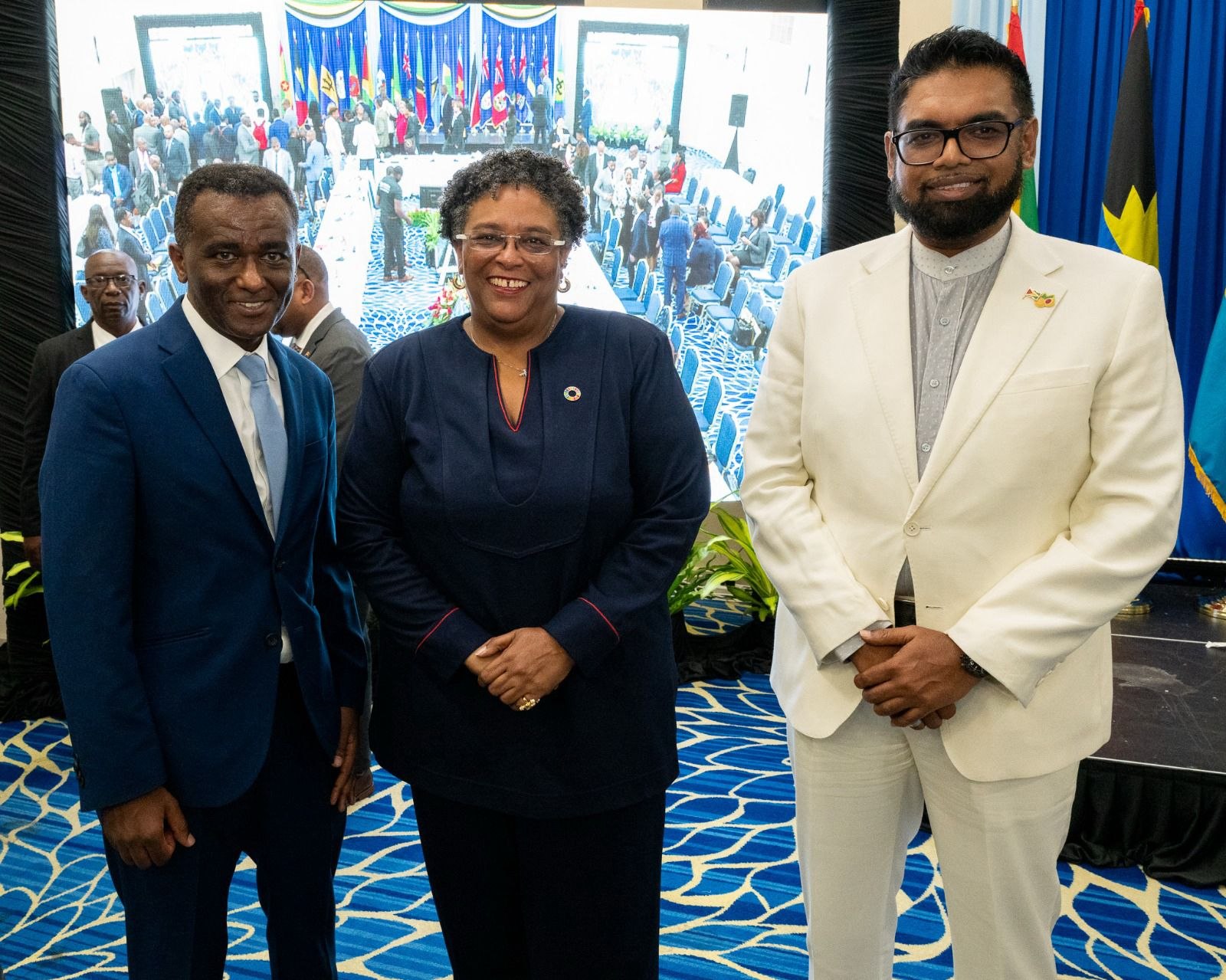
Haileyesus Getahun with Prime Minister Mia Amor Mottley of Barbados and President Irfaan Ali of Guyana in 2024.

Getahun established the Health Development Partnership for Africa and the Caribbean (HeDPAC), which was incubated at the WHO headquarters from May 2022 to December 2023, before being registered as a not-for-profit international organisation in Barbados and Rwanda. He also founded the Global Center for Health Diplomacy and Inclusion (CeHDI), which is a foundation registered in Geneva, Switzerland. His work is primarily focused on advancing South-to-South collaboration, the right to health and global health equity through diplomacy and high-level political advocacy.
