= 2,3-diaminopropionate N-oxalyltransferase =

Class of enzymes

Identifiers
- EC no.: 2.3.1.58
- CAS no.: 62213-48-3

Databases
- IntEnz: IntEnz view
- BRENDA: BRENDA entry
- ExPASy: NiceZyme view
- KEGG: KEGG entry
- MetaCyc: metabolic pathway
- PRIAM: profile
- PDB structures: RCSB PDB PDBe PDBsum
- Gene Ontology: AmiGO / QuickGO
Search
- PMC: articles
- PubMed: articles
- NCBI: proteins

In enzymology, a 2,3-diaminopropionate N-oxalyltransferase (EC 2.3.1.58) is an enzyme that catalyzes the chemical reaction

oxalyl-CoA + L-2,3-diaminopropanoate $\rightleftharpoons$ CoA + N_{3}-oxalyl-L-2,3-diaminopropanoate

Thus, the two substrates of this enzyme are oxalyl-CoA and L-2,3-diaminopropanoate, whereas its two products are CoA and N3-oxalyl-L-2,3-diaminopropanoate.

This enzyme belongs to the family of transferases, specifically those acyltransferases transferring groups other than aminoacyl groups. The systematic name of this enzyme class is oxalyl-CoA:L-2,3-diaminopropanoate N3-oxalyltransferase. Other names in common use include oxalyldiaminopropionate synthase, ODAP synthase, oxalyl-CoA:L-alpha,beta-diaminopropionic acid oxalyltransferase, oxalyldiaminopropionic synthase, and oxalyl-CoA:L-2,3-diaminopropanoate 3-N-oxalyltransferase.
