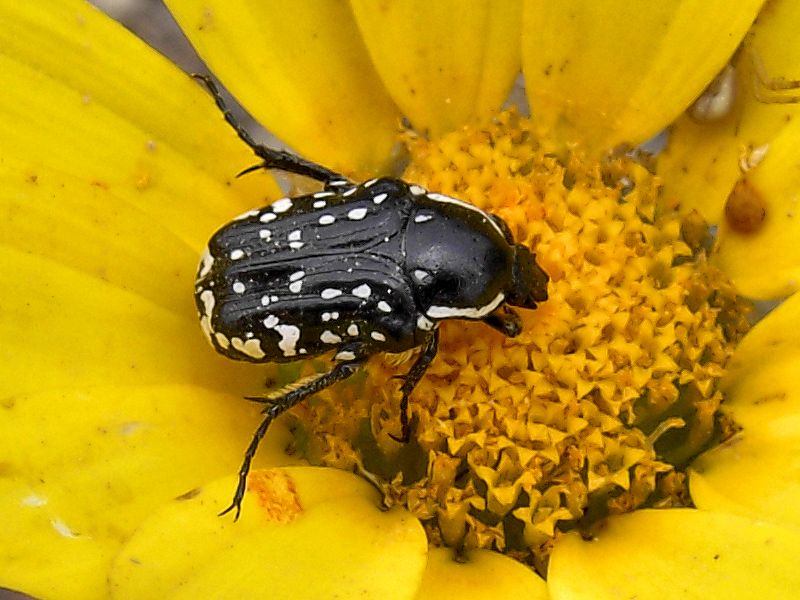
- Oxythyrea cinctella

Scientific classification
- Kingdom: Animalia
- Phylum: Arthropoda
- Clade: Pancrustacea
- Class: Insecta
- Order: Coleoptera
- Suborder: Polyphaga
- Infraorder: Scarabaeiformia
- Family: Scarabaeidae
- Subfamily: Cetoniinae
- Tribe: Cetoniini
- Genus: Oxythyrea; Mulsant, 1842

Synonyms
- Leucocelidia Olsoufieff, 1916

= Oxythyrea =

Genus of beetles

Oxythyrea is a genus of Palaearctic and African chafer beetles, erected by Étienne Mulsant in 1842.

== Description ==
Members are typically about 10–15 mm in size, and are usually black with white dots or lines on the thorax, elytra, and abdomen; each species has its own distinctive pattern. Oxythyrea are active during the day, and are often found feeding on flowers.

== Species ==
The taxonomy of this genus has been subject to debate, with subdivision into up to three subgenera including Oxythyrea (Oxythyrea sensu stricto); BioLib.cz includes the following:

1. Oxythyrea abigail Reiche & Saulcy, 1856
2. Oxythyrea abigailoides Mikšić, 1978
3. Oxythyrea albopicta (Motschulsky, 1845)
4. Oxythyrea cinctella (Schaum, 1841)
5. Oxythyrea cinctelloides (Reitter, 1898)
6. Oxythyrea dulcis Reitter, 1899
7. Oxythyrea funesta (Poda, 1761) - type species (as Scarabaeus funestus Poda von Neuhaus, 1761)
8. Oxythyrea groenbechi Petrovitz, 1955
9. Oxythyrea noemi Reiche & Saulcy, 1856
10. Oxythyrea pantherina (Gory & Percheron, 1833)
11. Oxythyrea subcalva Marseul, 1878
12. Oxythyrea tripolitana Reitter, 1891

subgenus Oxythyrea (Manodema) Moser, 1907

- Oxythyrea pygidialis

subgenus Oxythyrea (Stichothyrea) Kraatz, 1882

1. Oxythyrea densata
2. Oxythyrea guttifera
3. Oxythyrea picticollis

Some species have been classified in a closely related genus Leucocelis.

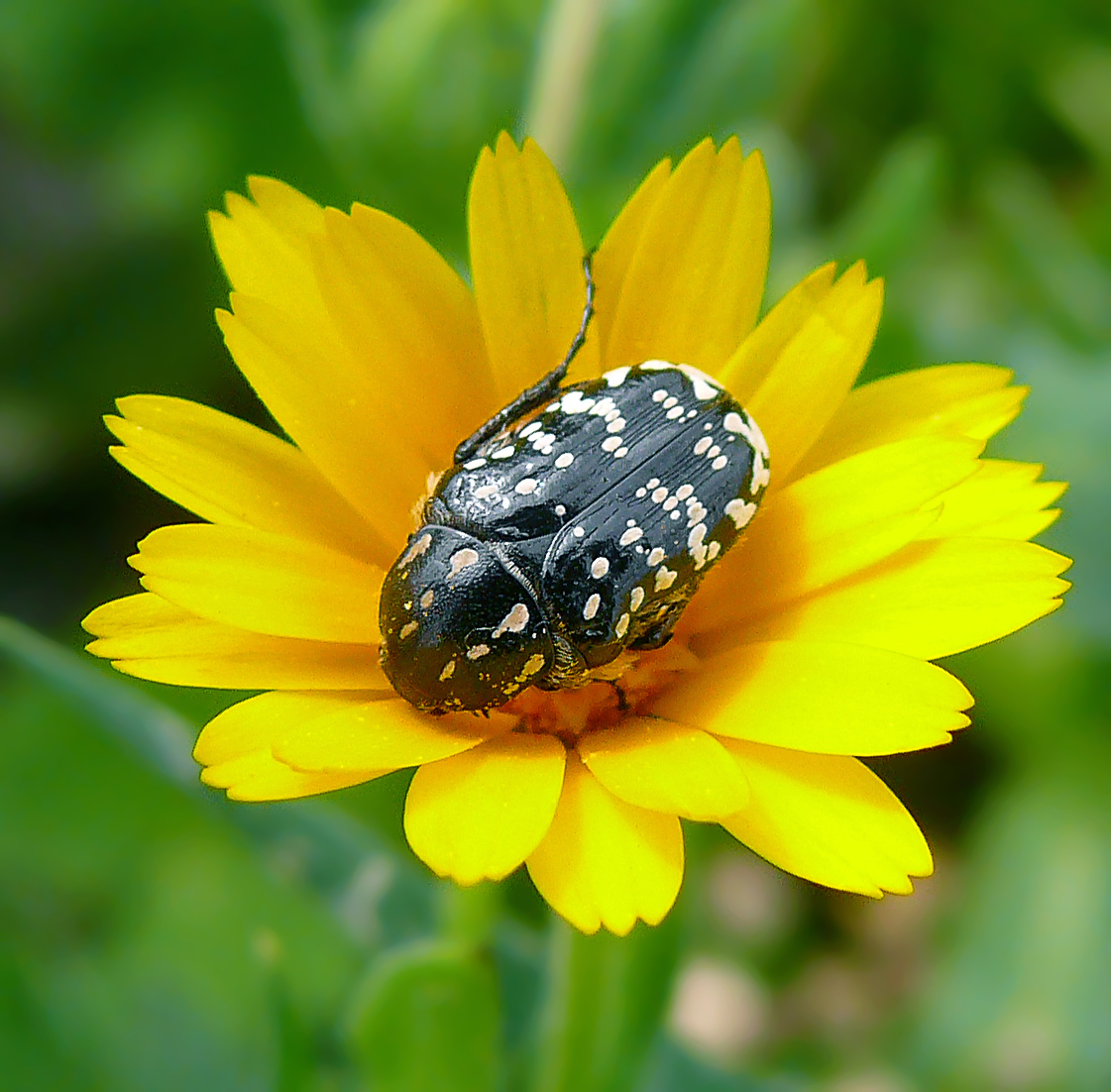
Oxythyrea noemi

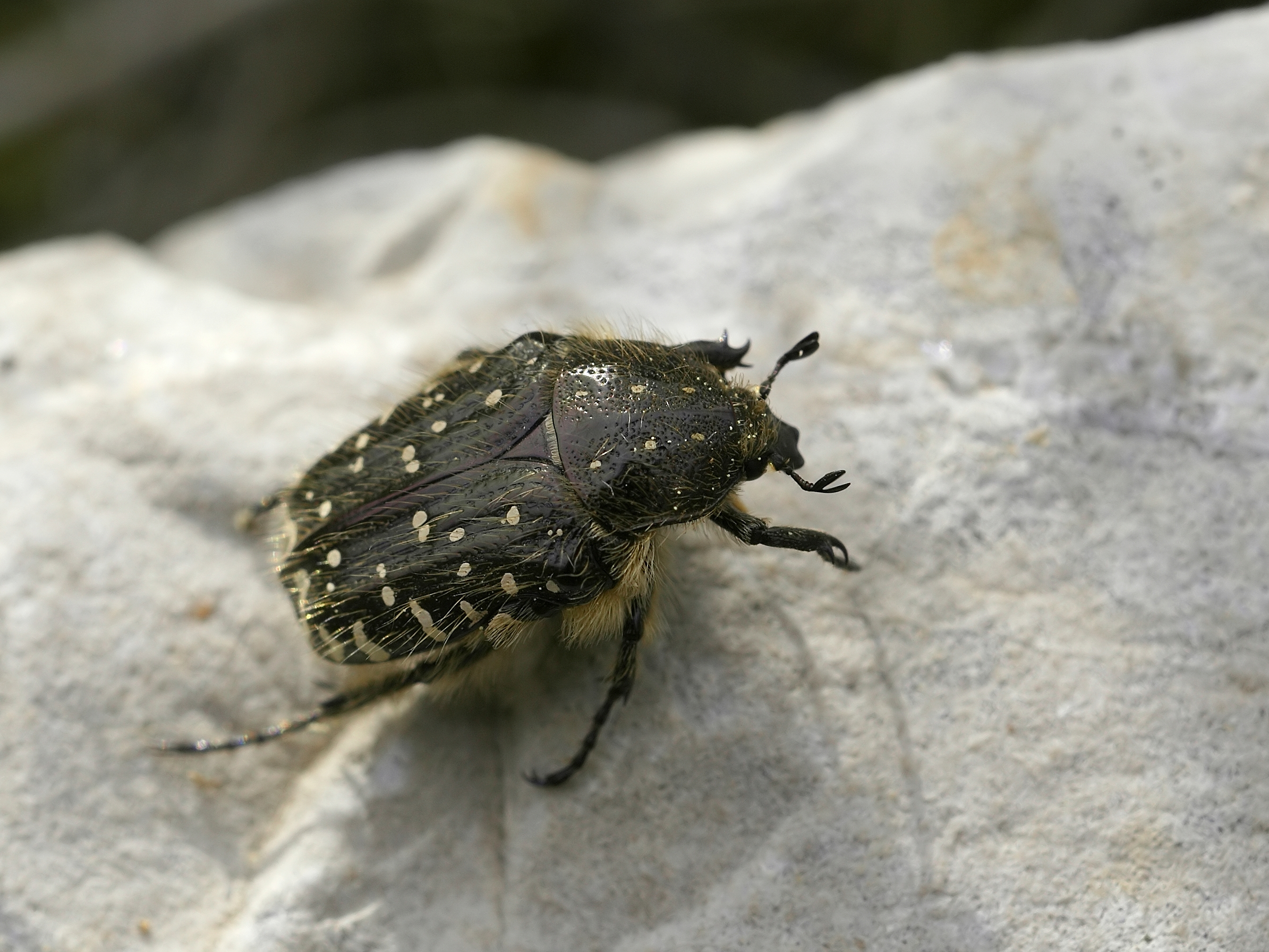
Oxythyrea funesta

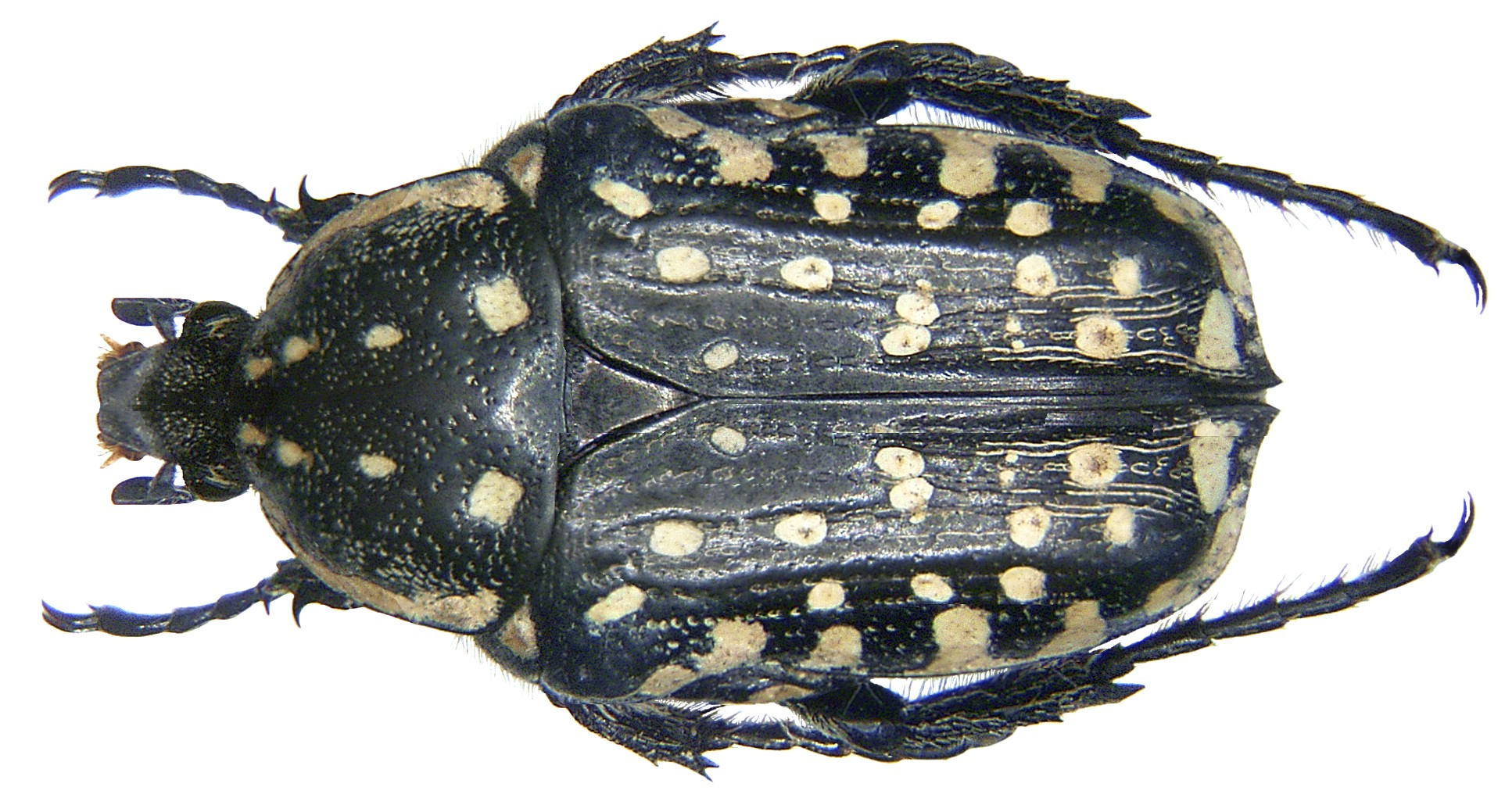
Oxythyrea pantherina
