= Bhavamishra =

16th-century Indian physician

Bhavamishra was an Indian physician in the 16th century. He is one of the most revered writers in Ayurveda for his work Bhavaprakasha.

== Bhavaprakasha ==
The Bhavaprakasha addresses the origin of medicine, cosmology, anatomy, embryology, dietetics, pharmacology, pathology and therapy, as well as the manufacture of aphrodisiacs and elixirs.

The Bhavaprakasha mentions the syphilis introduced at that time by Portuguese traders, which it refers to as Firanga Roga, or "the disease of the white men". The work also includes a remedy for syphilis. It mentions lathyrism, and its etiology also.
