= Neurolathyrism =

Neurological disease of humans, caused by eating certain legumes of the genus Lathyrus

- Specialty: Neurology
- Symptoms: Weakness, fatigue, paralysis of the legs, atrophy of leg muscles
- Usual onset: Gradual
- Duration: Permanent
- Diagnostic method: Based on symptoms and diet
- Frequency: Rare

Neurolathyrism, is a neurological disease of humans, caused by eating certain legumes of the genus Lathyrus. This disease is mainly associated with the consumption of Lathyrus sativus (also known as grass pea, chickling pea, kesari dal, or almorta) and to a lesser degree with Lathyrus cicera, Lathyrus ochrus and Lathyrus clymenum containing the toxin ODAP.

This is not to be confused with osteolathyrism, a different type of lathyrism that affects the connective tissues. Osteolathyrism results from the ingestion of Lathyrus odoratus seeds (sweet peas) and is often referred to as odoratism. It is caused by a different toxin (beta-aminopropionitrile) which affects the linking of collagen, a protein of connective tissues.

Another type of lathyrism is angiolathyrism which is similar to osteolathyrism in its effects on connective tissue. However, the blood vessels are affected as opposed to bone.

== Signs and symptoms ==
The consumption of large quantities of Lathyrus seeds containing high concentrations of the neurotoxic glutamate analogue β-oxalyl-L-α,β-diaminopropionic acid (ODAP, also known as β-N-oxalyl-amino-L-alanine, or BOAA) causes paralysis, characterized by lack of strength in or inability to move the lower limbs, and may involve pyramidal tracts, producing signs of upper motor neuron damage. The toxin may also cause aortic aneurysm. A unique symptom of lathyrism is the atrophy of gluteal (buttocks) muscles. ODAP is a poison of the mitochondria, leading to excess cell death, especially in motor neurons. Children can additionally develop bone deformity and reduced brain development.

=== Related conditions ===
A related disease has been identified and named osteolathyrism, because it affects the bones and connecting tissues, instead of the nervous system. It is a skeletal disorder, caused by the toxin beta-aminopropionitrile (BAPN), and characterized by hernias, aortic dissection, exostoses, and kyphoscoliosis and other skeletal deformities, apparently as the result of defective aging of collagen tissue. The cause of this disease is attributed to beta-aminopropionitrile, which inhibits the copper-containing enzyme lysyl oxidase, responsible for cross-linking procollagen and proelastin. BAPN is also a metabolic product of a compound present in sprouts of grasspea, pea and lentils. Disorders that are clinically similar are konzo and lytico-bodig disease.

== Causes ==
Glutamic acid

Oxalyldiaminopropionic acid

The toxicological cause of the disease has been attributed to the neurotoxin ODAP which acts as a structural analogue of the neurotransmitter glutamate. Lathyrism can also be caused by deliberate food adulteration.

=== Association with famine ===
Ingestion of legumes containing the toxin occurs despite an awareness of the means to detoxify Lathyrus. Drought conditions can lead to shortages of both fuel and water, preventing the necessary detoxification steps from being taken, particularly in impoverished countries. Lathyrism usually occurs where the combination of poverty and food insecurity leaves few other food options.

== Diagnosis ==
There are no diagnostic criteria for neurolathyrism. Diagnosis is based on clinical features and exclusion of other diagnoses.

== Prevention ==
Eating the chickling pea with legumes having high concentrations of sulphur-based amino acids reduces the risk of lathyrism if such grain is available. Food preparation is also an important factor. Toxic amino acids are readily soluble in water and can be leached. Bacterial (lactic acid) and fungal (tempeh) fermentation is useful to reduce ODAP content. Moist heat (boiling, steaming) denatures protease inhibitors which otherwise add to the toxic effect of raw chickling pea through depletion of protective sulfur amino acids. During drought and famine, water for steeping and fuel for boiling are often also in short supply. Poor people sometimes know how to reduce the chance of developing lathyrism but face a choice between starvation and risking lathyrism.

== Epidemiology ==
This disease is prevalent in some areas of Bangladesh, Ethiopia, India and Nepal, and affects more men than women. Men between 25 and 40 are particularly vulnerable.

== History ==
The first mentioned intoxication goes back to ancient India and also Hippocrates mentions a neurological disorder 46 B.C. in Greece caused by Lathyrus seed.

During the Spanish War of Independence against Napoleon, grasspea served as a famine food. This was the subject of one of Francisco de Goya's famous aquatint prints titled Gracias a la Almorta ("Thanks to the Grasspea"), depicting poor people surviving on a porridge made from grasspea flour, one of them lying on the floor, already crippled by it.

During WWII, on the order of Colonel I. Murgescu, commandant of the Vapniarka concentration camp in Transnistria, the detainees - most of them Jews - were fed nearly exclusively with fodder pea. Consequently, they became ill from lathyrism.

=== Modern occurrence ===
During the post Civil war period in Spain, there were several outbreaks of lathyrism, caused by the shortage of food, which led people to consume excessive amounts of almorta flour.

In Spain, a seed mixture known as comuña consisting of Lathyrus sativus, L. cicera, Vicia sativa and V. ervilia provides a potent mixture of toxic amino acids to poison monogastric (single stomached) animals. Particularly the toxin β-cyanoalanine from seeds of V. sativa enhances the toxicity of such a mixture through its inhibition of sulfur amino acid metabolism (conversion of methionine to cysteine leading to excretion of cystathionine in urine) and hence depletion of protective reduced thiols. Its use for sheep does not pose any lathyrism problems if doses do not exceed 50 percent of the ration.
