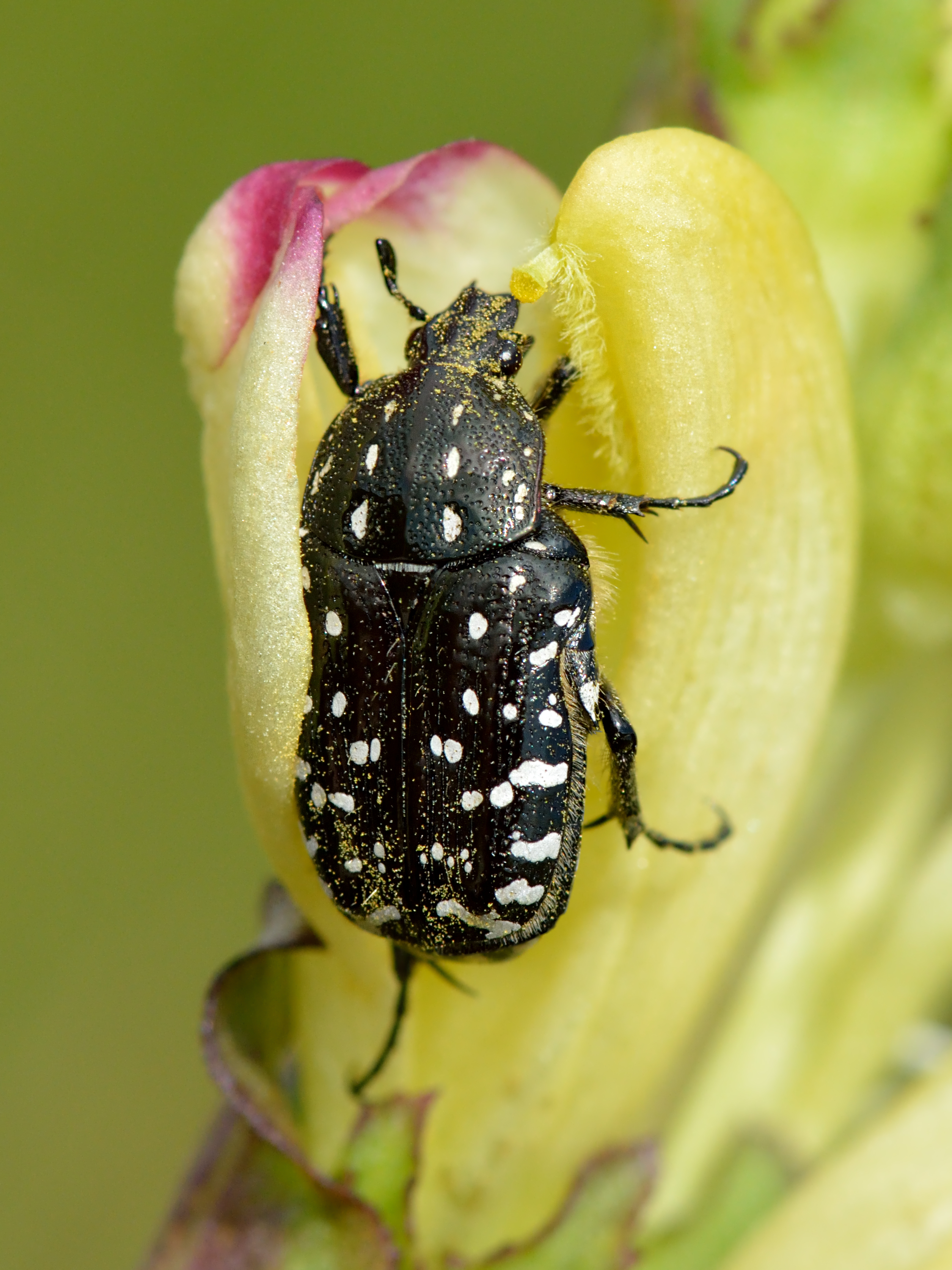

Scientific classification
- Kingdom: Animalia
- Phylum: Arthropoda
- Clade: Pancrustacea
- Class: Insecta
- Order: Coleoptera
- Suborder: Polyphaga
- Infraorder: Scarabaeiformia
- Family: Scarabaeidae
- Genus: Oxythyrea
- Species: O. funesta

Binomial name
- Oxythyrea funesta (Poda, 1761)

= Oxythyrea funesta =

Species of beetle

Oxythyrea funesta is a phytophagous beetle species belonging to the family Cetoniidae, subfamily Cetoniinae. Its common name is "white spotted rose beetle".

This beetle is present in most of Europe, in the west Palearctic realm, and in the Near East. It is not present in North or South America.

Larvae are 16-22 mm long. They feed on dung, rotten wood, litter and soil and can remain until next spring in the soil.

The adults appear early in the spring, they grow up to 8–12 millimetres (0.31–0.47 in) and can mostly be encountered from May through July. They can be considered a pest since they feed not only on pollen, but also on floral organs, especially those in light colors.

Their colour is black, more or less bronzed. Most of the specimens show six white spots in two longitudinal rows on the pronotum and many others on the elytra. They are completely covered with white pubescence (easily visible in profile). Older specimens usually have no hairs, as they are rubbed off with time.

== Description of the larvae ==
The larva lives in the soil and feeds on plant roots, etc. When hatched, it is 4–5 mm long, quite dark blue and with minimal hair, which distinguishes it from other species. It moves very nimbly with sharp movements. The first stage is short (just over 2 weeks) and the larva molts until the next stage. The second instar is larger and more exposed to light. The third instar is the largest and appears in late summer. Pupation usually occurs in the fall. Body length 16–22 mm. Skull: width 2.11-2.55 mm, height: 1.27-1.56 mm. Skull yellowish to yellowish-brown, smooth and semicircular in shape, dorsally flattened (length of dorsal straight part of skull border slightly less than the one-third of maximum width of skull). The epipharynx has zygum with 12-16 strong conical setae and 5-11 similar setae at their proximal base. Chaetoparia with 45-62 and 31-45 setae on the right and left sides, respectively. Acanthoparia with 4-8 ovate setae, 1 or 2 dorsal setae elongated. Stridulatory region of jaws with 15-19 transverse ridges, ridges in distal half-width (distance between two ridges between 1/3 and 1/2 of the length of the ridge), ridges on the proximal half narrow. Apical scissor tooth of left mandible falcate and about two to three times larger than subapical tooth. Transverse proximal row of setae and sensilla on Ligula consists of approximately 8 campanulate sensilla and a few stout lanceolate setae. Thoracic legs with stout (spine-like) or long hairy setae, hairy setae always are well-developed. Spiral with 11-14 holes in diameter. Raster monostich, composed of a single horseshoe-shaped row of 23-40 pali, septula broadly ovate, open posteriorly, almost as wide as long. Tegillar setae as long as pali or three times as long, with only a few longer setae. Tegilla fused, rarely setose (mean distance between two setae about two or three times the length of palus), campus absent. The dorsal parts of the last abdominal segment are sparsely setolized, with a more or less distinct circular field of sparse short setae, often bordered by indistinct long ring-shaped setae.

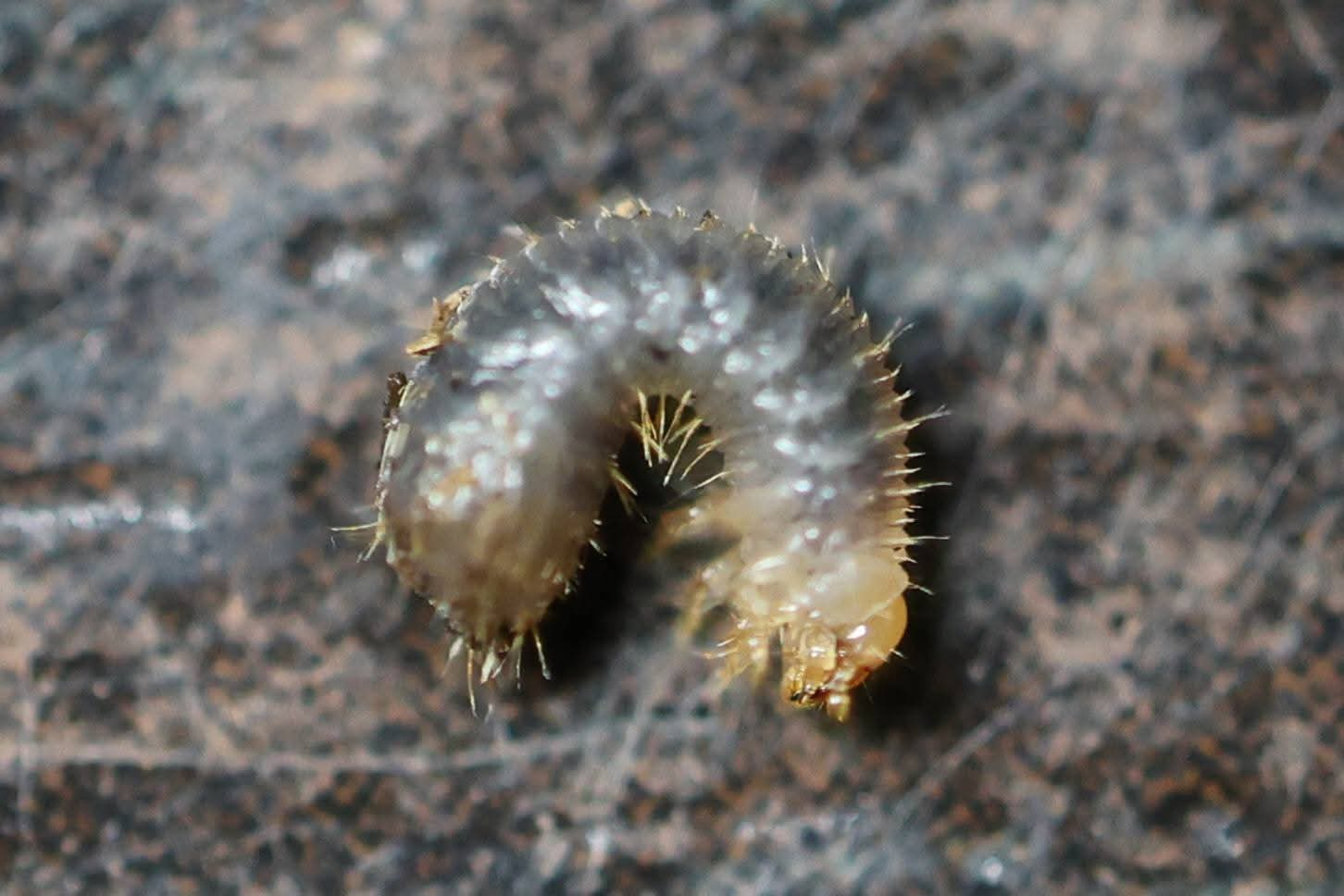
The larva is small and light during the first stage

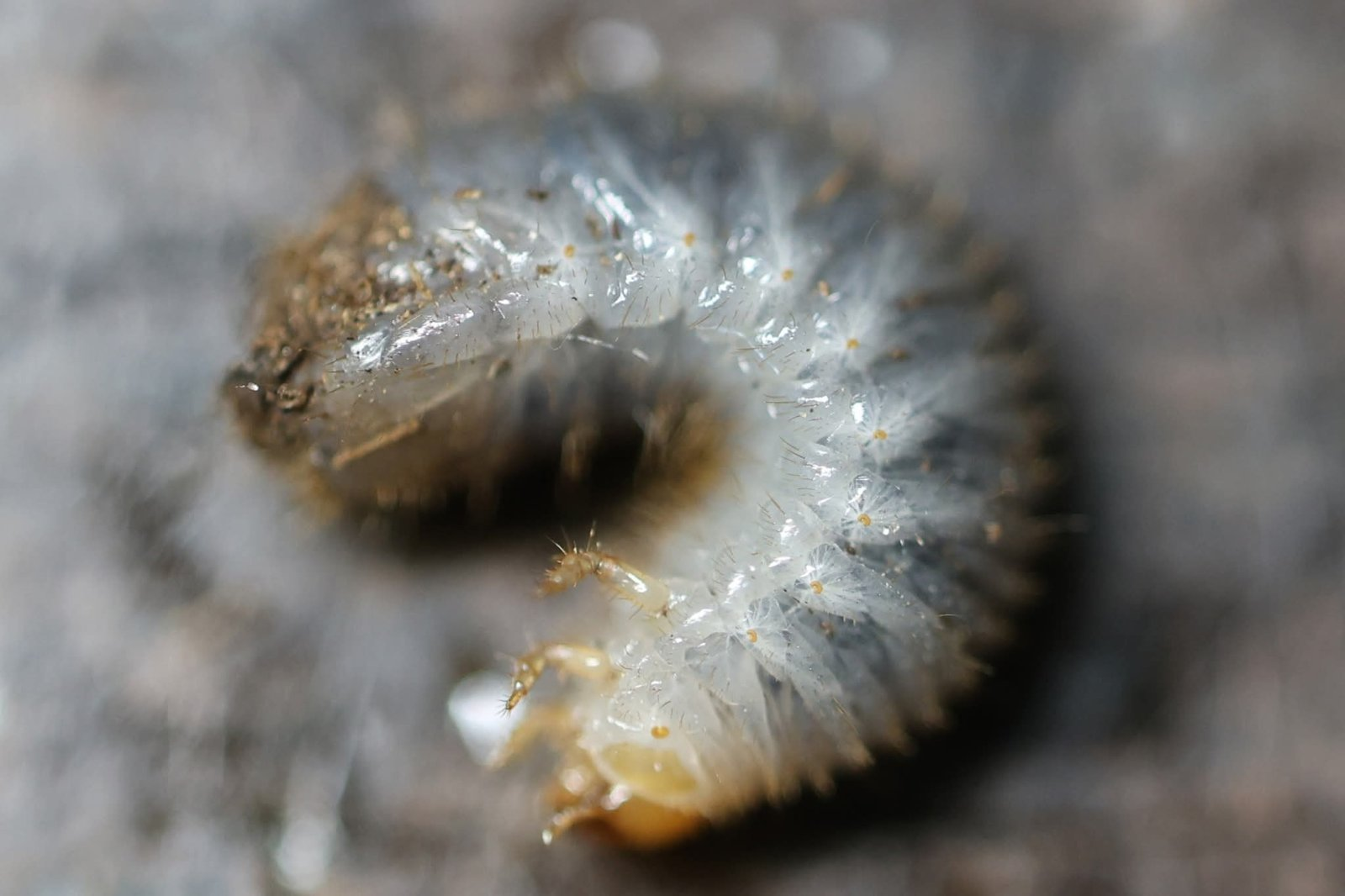
2nd stage

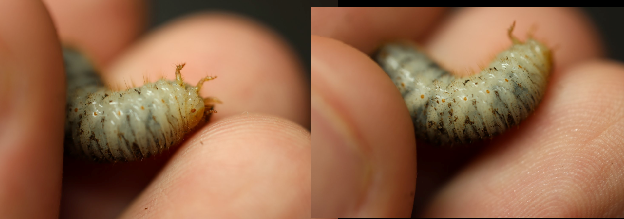
Last instar or fully-grown larva

== Pupae ==
The larvae build pupal cells in late summer or early autumn, in which they spend up to 1 week. They then molt. The pupal cell consists of pieces of soil and roots. The stage takes 3 weeks, but very often ends around the 15th day. The adults usually do not emerge after imagining and wait until the following spring, when they become active towards late April.

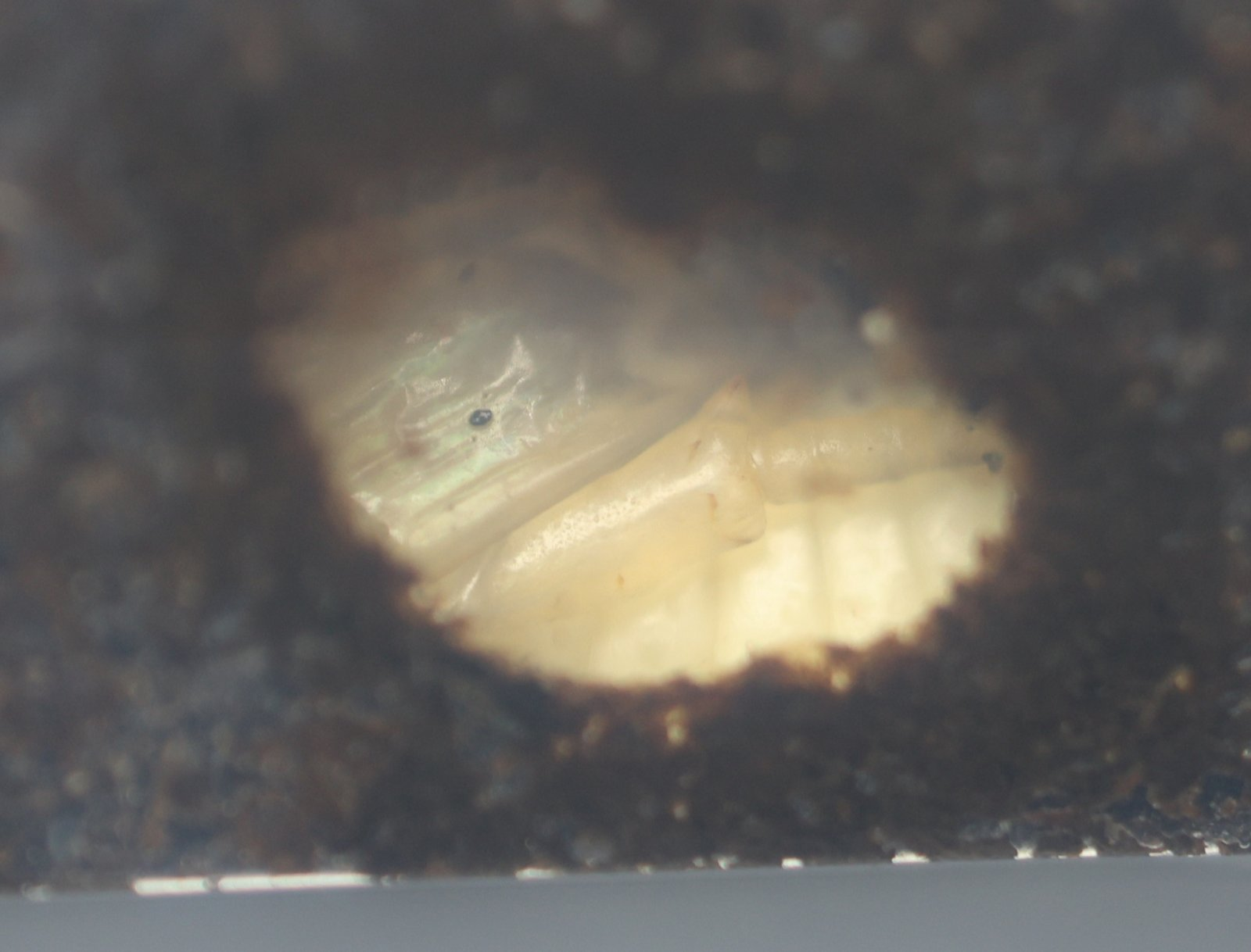
Pupa in its cell

== Chafers and Man ==
This phytophagous beetle is considered a pest because it feeds not only on pollen, but also on floral organs, particularly the light-colored flowers of Rosaceae (including fruit trees, roses, strawberries and irises). When present in large numbers, they can cause damage to peach, citrus, and Actinidia (kiwi) orchards or ornamental plant crops during flowering by consuming the stamens or damaging the pistils.

The rose chafer beetle has only one predator, the hairy scolia wasp (Scolia hirta), which parasitizes it. This species of wasp is endangered, leaving the field open for the rose chafer beetle to proliferate.

There is no chemical treatment. Gardeners who wish to eliminate this insect take advantage of its preference for white flowers, on which it is highly visible, and do so manually. This operation is more effective at lower temperatures, as the beetles' flight activity is limited below 18 degrees Celsius. Above this temperature, they will be lethargic, but their activity will gradually increase with the temperature and they will be more difficult to catch. Some commercial traps are available for purchase with chemical attractants but results are not impressive as they seem to find newly opened flower blossoms more attractive.

== Subspecies ==
- Oxythyrea funesta var. consobrina Villa
- Oxythyrea funesta var. deleta Mulsant
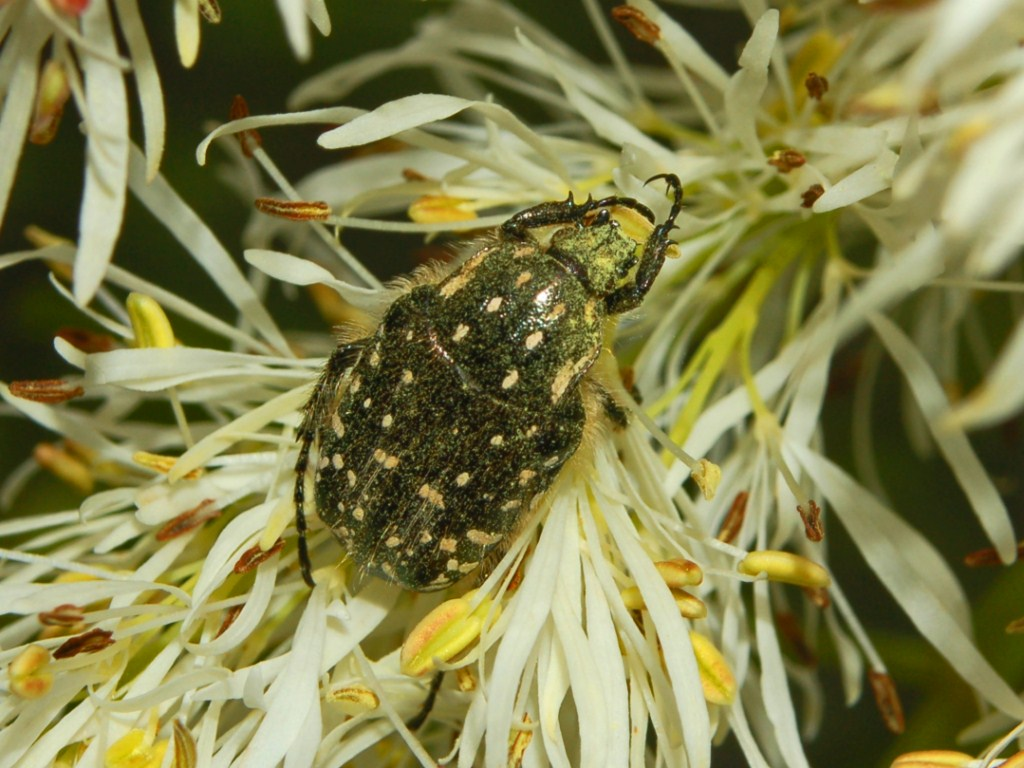

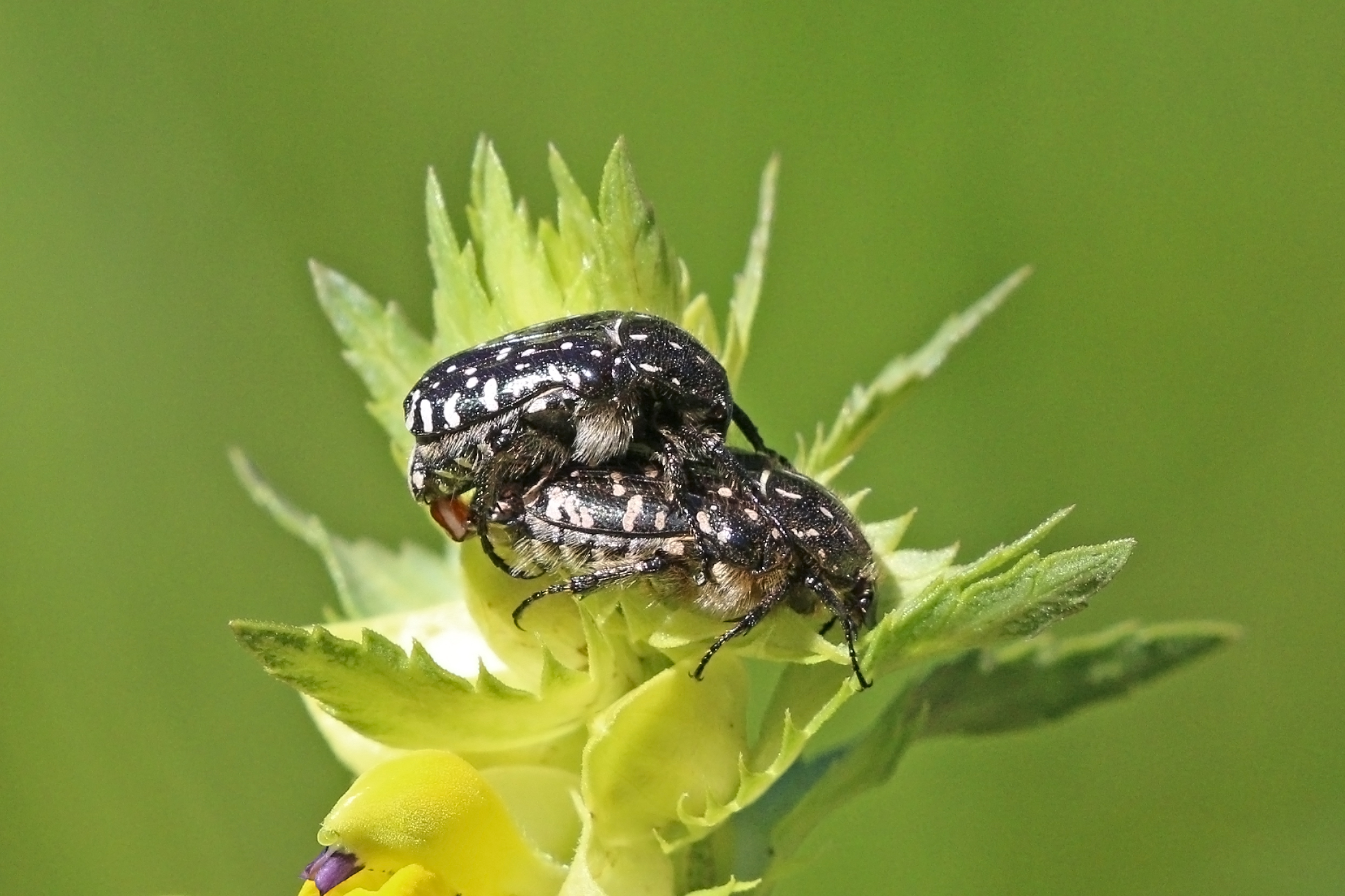
Mating, Estonia

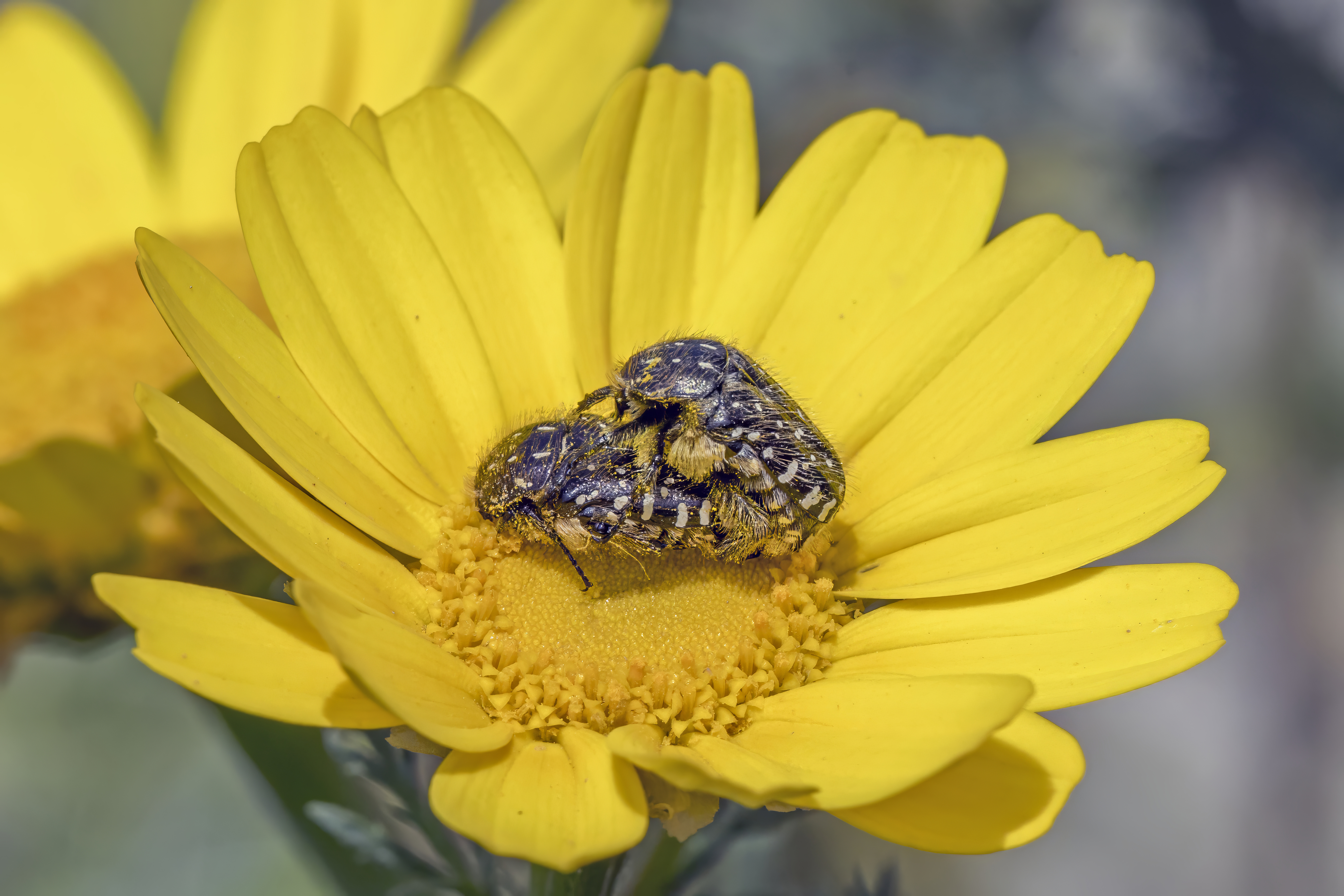
Mating, Tunisia

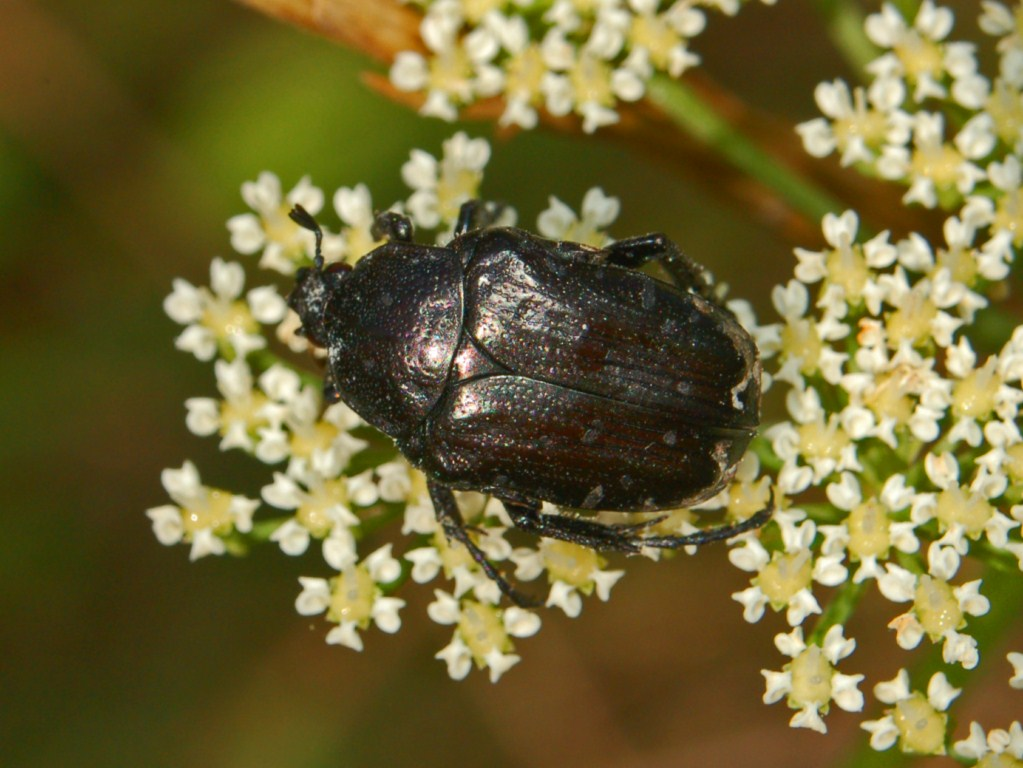
Older specimen
