= Aminopropionitrile =

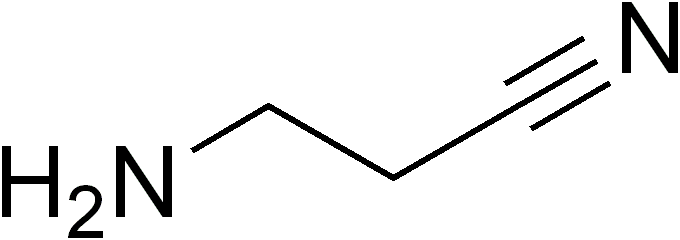

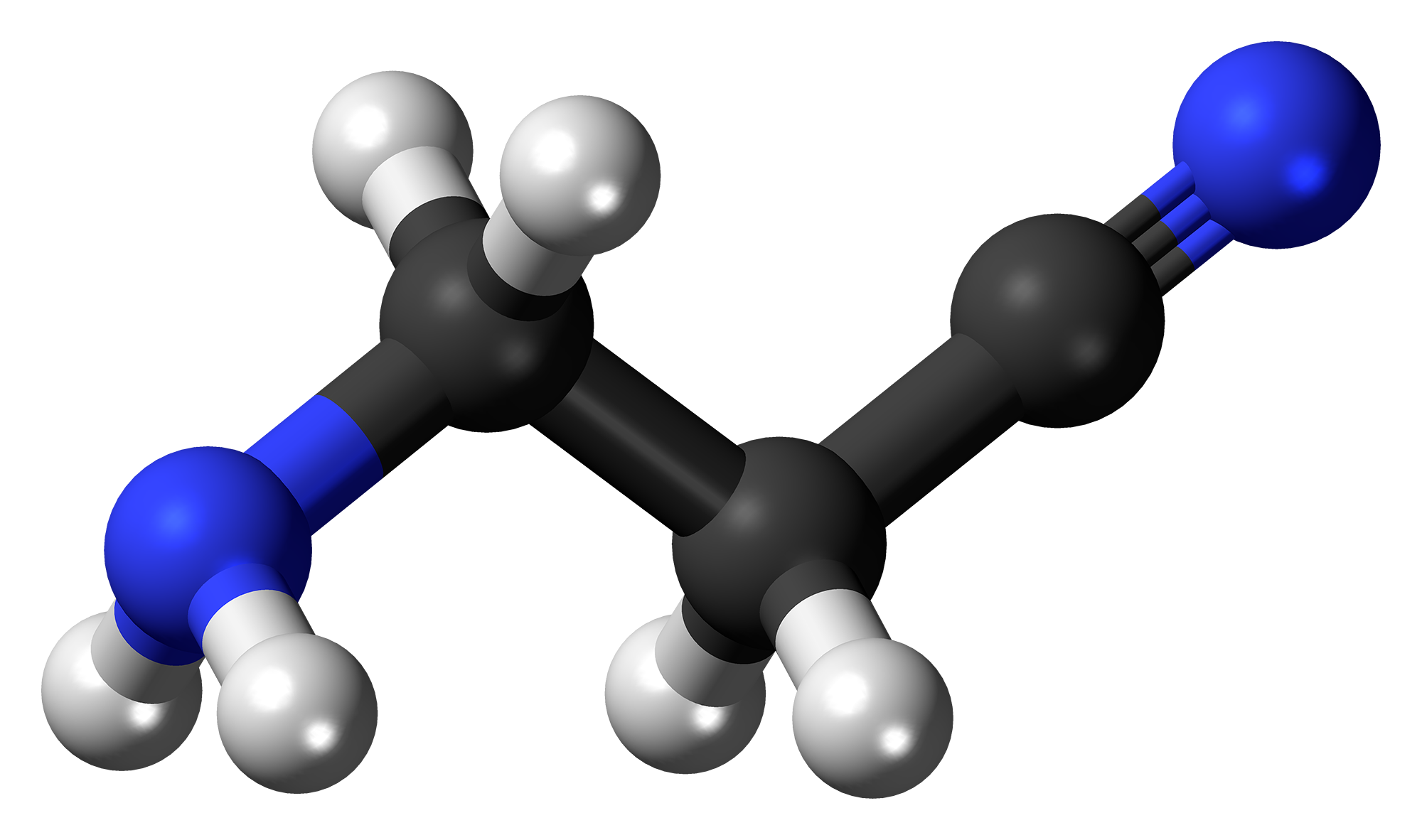

Names
- Preferred IUPAC name 3-Aminopropanenitrile
- Other names 2-Cyanoethylamine

Identifiers
CAS Number	151-18-8
3D model (JSmol)	Interactive image
Beilstein Reference	1698848
ChEBI	CHEBI:27413
ChemSpider	21241485
ECHA InfoCard	100.005.261
EC Number	205-786-0
Gmelin Reference	600476
KEGG	C05670
MeSH	Aminopropionitrile
PubChem CID	1647
RTECS number	UG0350000
UNII	38D5LJ4KH2
CompTox Dashboard (EPA)	DTXSID6048418
- InChI: InChI=1S/C3H6N2/c4-2-1-3-5/h1-2,4H2 Key: AGSPXMVUFBBBMO-UHFFFAOYSA-N
- SMILES: NCCC#N

Properties
Chemical formula	C_{3}H_{6}N_{2}
Molar mass	70.095 g·mol^{−1}
Appearance	Colourless liquid
Boiling point	79 to 81 °C; 174 to 178 °F; 352 to 354 K at 2.1 kPa
Acidity (pK_{a})	7.80 (conjugate acid; 20 °C, H_{2}O)

Pharmacology
ATCvet code	QM01AX91 (WHO)

Related compounds
Related alkanenitriles	Acetonitrile; Aminoacetonitrile; Glycolonitrile; Cyanogen; Propanenitrile; Malononitrile; Pivalonitrile; Acetone cyanohydrin; Butyronitrile; Succinonitrile; Tetramethylsuccinonitrile
Related compounds	DBNPA
- Except where otherwise noted, data are given for materials in their standard state (at 25 °C [77 °F], 100 kPa). Infobox references

Aminopropionitrile, also known as β-aminopropionitrile (BAPN), is an organic compound with both amine and nitrile functional groups. It is a colourless liquid. The compound occurs naturally and is of interest in the biomedical community.

== Biochemical and medical occurrence ==
BAPN is the toxic constituent of peas from Lathyrus plants, e.g., Lathyrus odoratus. Lathyrism, a disease known for centuries, encompasses 2 distinct entities: a disorder of connective tissue, causing either bone deformity (osteolathyrism) or aortic aneurisms (angiolathyrim). BAPN causes osteolathyrism and angiolathyrism when ingested in large quantities." It can cause osteolathyrism, neurolathyrism, and/or angiolathyrism.

It is an antirheumatic agent in veterinary medicine.

It has attracted interest as an anticancer agent.

== Production ==
Aminopropionitrile is prepared by the reaction of ammonia with acrylonitrile.

== See also ==
- Kashin-Beck disease
- Lysyl oxidase
- Marfan syndrome
