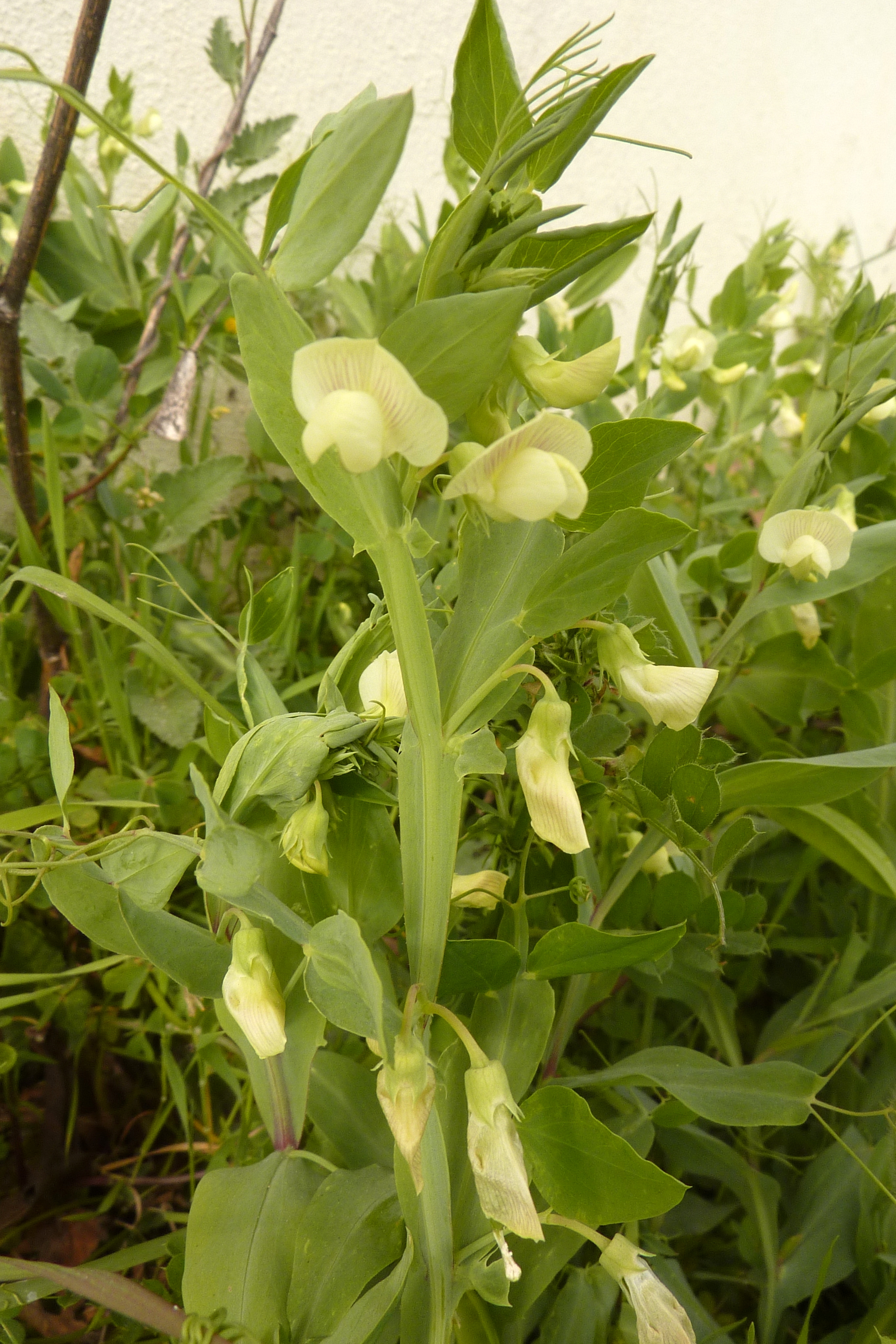

Scientific classification
- Kingdom: Plantae
- Clade: Tracheophytes
- Clade: Angiosperms
- Clade: Eudicots
- Clade: Rosids
- Order: Fabales
- Family: Fabaceae
- Subfamily: Faboideae
- Genus: Lathyrus
- Species: L. ochrus

Binomial name
- Lathyrus ochrus (L.) DC.

= Lathyrus ochrus =

Species of plant

Lathyrus ochrus, the Cyprus vetch, is a species of annual herb in the family Fabaceae. They are climbers and have compound, broad leaves. Flowers are visited by Old World swallowtails and Oxythyrea funesta.

== Archaeobotanical record ==
Archaeobotanical remains of Lathyrus ochrus have been identified in Late Bronze Age palatial contexts at Tel Beit Shemesh and the Unexplored Mansion at Knossos. At Tel Beit Shemesh, a 2019 study identified approximately 8,000 carbonized seeds in two deposits associated with wheat in the 14th-century BCE palace..

== Sources ==
This article incorporates text from a free content work. Licensed under CC0 (license statement/permission). Text taken from Lathyrus ochrus. Encyclopedia of Life.
