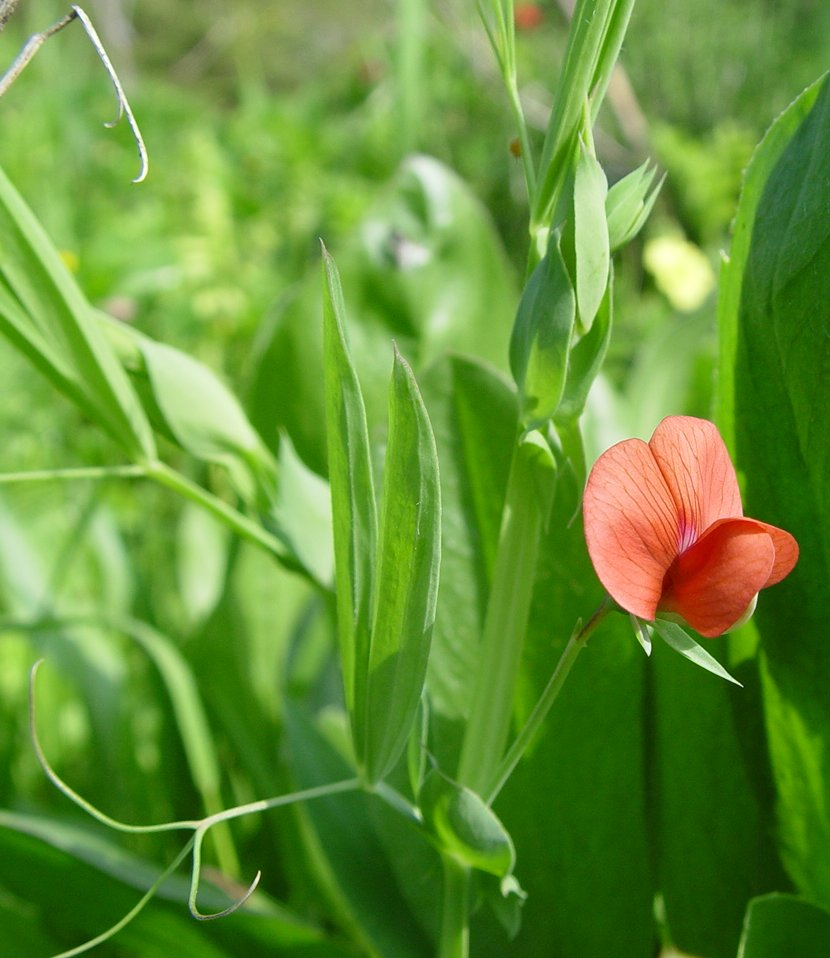

Scientific classification
- Kingdom: Plantae
- Clade: Tracheophytes
- Clade: Angiosperms
- Clade: Eudicots
- Clade: Rosids
- Order: Fabales
- Family: Fabaceae
- Subfamily: Faboideae
- Genus: Lathyrus
- Species: L. cicera

Binomial name
- Lathyrus cicera L.

= Lathyrus cicera =

Species of legume

Lathyrus cicera is a species of wild pea known by the common names red pea, red vetchling and flatpod peavine. It is native to Europe, North Africa, and the Middle East, and it is known from other places as an introduced species. This is a hairless annual herb producing a slightly winged stem. The leaves are each made up of two leaflike linear leaflets 3 to 6 centimeters (1.2 to 2.4 in) long. They also bear branched, curling tendrils. The inflorescence holds a single pea flower 1 to 1.5 centimeters (0.39 to 0.59 in) wide which is a varying shade of red. The fruit is a hairless dehiscent legume pod.

This is one pea species known to cause lathyrism; nevertheless, as cicerchia it figured among the comestibles enjoyed by the fortunate Milanese, listed at length by Bonvesin de la Riva in his "Marvels of Milan" (1288).
