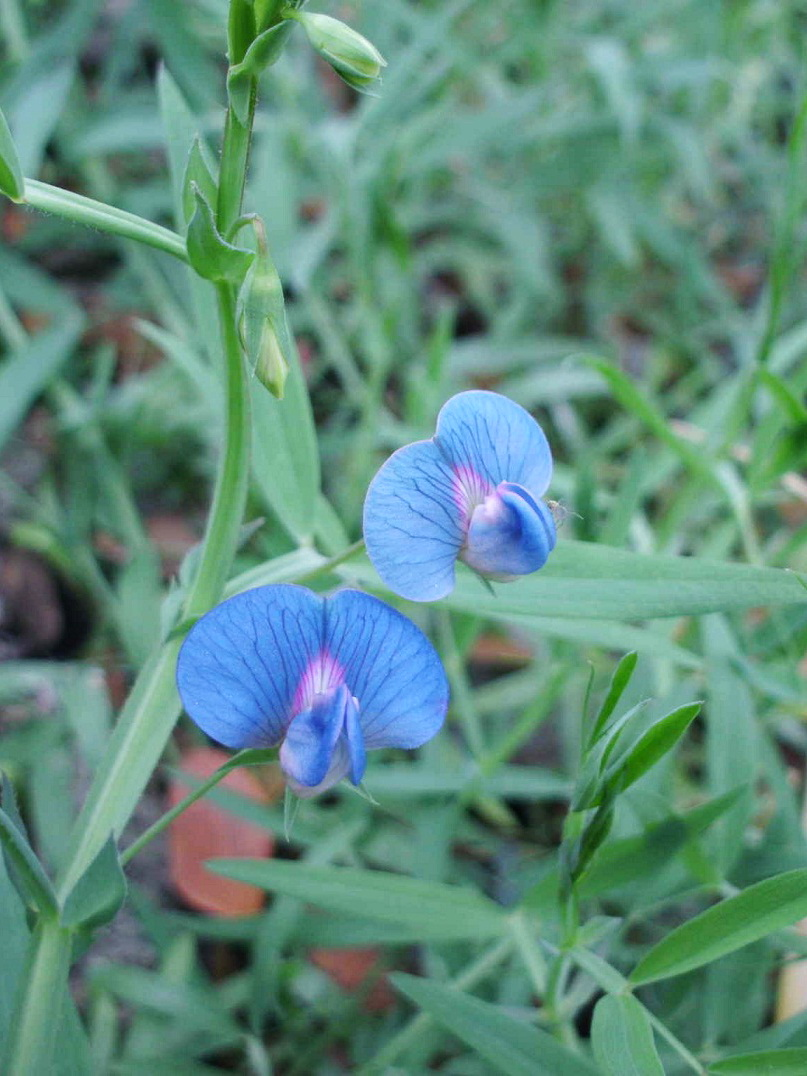

Scientific classification
- Kingdom: Plantae
- Clade: Tracheophytes
- Clade: Angiosperms
- Clade: Eudicots
- Clade: Rosids
- Order: Fabales
- Family: Fabaceae
- Subfamily: Faboideae
- Genus: Lathyrus
- Species: L. sativus

Binomial name
- Lathyrus sativus L.

Synonyms
- List: Cicercula alata Moench; Cicercula alba Medik.; Cicercula caerulea Medik.; Cicercula sativa (L.) Medik.; Lathyrus asiaticus (Zalkind) Kudrj.; Lathyrus azureus Dean; Lathyrus sativus subsp. albus Smekalova; Lathyrus sativus f. chlorospermus Smekalova; Lathyrus sativus var. comitans Smekalova; Lathyrus sativus var. depressus Smekalova; Lathyrus sativus var. orbiculatus Smekalova; Lathyrus sativus var. parviflorus Smekalova; Lathyrus sativus var. pisiformis Smekalova; Lathyrus sativus var. platyspermus Smekalova; Lathyrus sativus var. pulchrus Smekalova; Lathyrus sativus var. variegatus Smekalova; Lathyrus sativus var. violascens Smekalova; Orobus bimarginatus Stokes; Pisum lathyrus E.H.L.Krause

= Lathyrus sativus =

Species of plant in the pea family

Lathyrus sativus, also known as grass pea, grasspea, peagrass, cicerchia, blue sweet pea, chickling pea, chickling vetch, Indian pea, white pea and white vetch, is a legume (family Fabaceae) commonly grown for human consumption and livestock feed in Asia and East Africa. It is a particularly important crop in areas that are prone to drought and famine, and is thought of as an 'insurance crop' as it produces reliable yields when all other crops fail. The seeds contain a neurotoxin that causes lathyrism, a neurodegenerative disease, if eaten as a primary protein source for a prolonged period.

== Cultivation ==
Although the exact origins of L. sativus are debated, it was most likely domesticated in the Balkan region in about 6000 BCE.

Lathyrus sativus grows best where the average temperature is 10–25 °C and average rainfall is 400–650 mm (16–26 in) per year. Like other legumes, it improves the nitrogen content of soil. The crop can survive drought or flooding, but grows best in moist soils. It tolerates a range of soil types from light sandy through loamy to heavy clay, and acid, neutral, or alkaline soils. It does not tolerate shade.

Slow Food inducted Serra de'Conti Cicerchia, a cicerchia grown in Serra de’ Conti Municipality, Ancona Province, Marche region of Italy, into the Ark of Taste.

== Uses ==
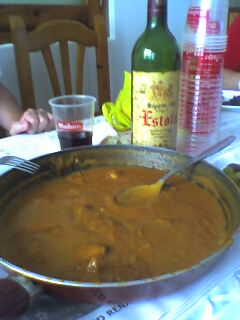
Gachas manchegas, a grass pea flour preparation

The seed is sold for human consumption at markets in Florence. Its consumption in the country is limited to Central Italy and is steadily declining.

Flour made from grass peas (Spanish: almorta) is the main ingredient for the gachas manchegas or gachas de almorta. Accompaniments for the dish vary throughout La Mancha. This is an ancient Manchego cuisine staple, generally consumed during the cold winter months. The dish is generally eaten directly out of the pan in which it was cooked, using either a spoon or a simple slice of bread. This dish is commonly consumed immediately after removing it from the fire, being careful not to burn one's lips or tongue.

Due to its toxicity, it was forbidden for human consumption in Spain from 1967 to 2018. However, it was widely sold as animal feed, but displayed together with flour for human consumption.

The town of Alvaiázere in Portugal dedicates a festival lasting several days to dishes featuring the pulse. Alvaiázere calls itself the Chícharo capital, the name of this pulse in Portuguese.

Immature seeds can be eaten like green peas. Mature seeds need soaking and thorough cooking to reduce toxins.

The leaves and stem are cooked and eaten as chana saga (Odia: ଚଣା ଶାଗ) in parts of Odisha, India.

== Neurotoxic properties ==
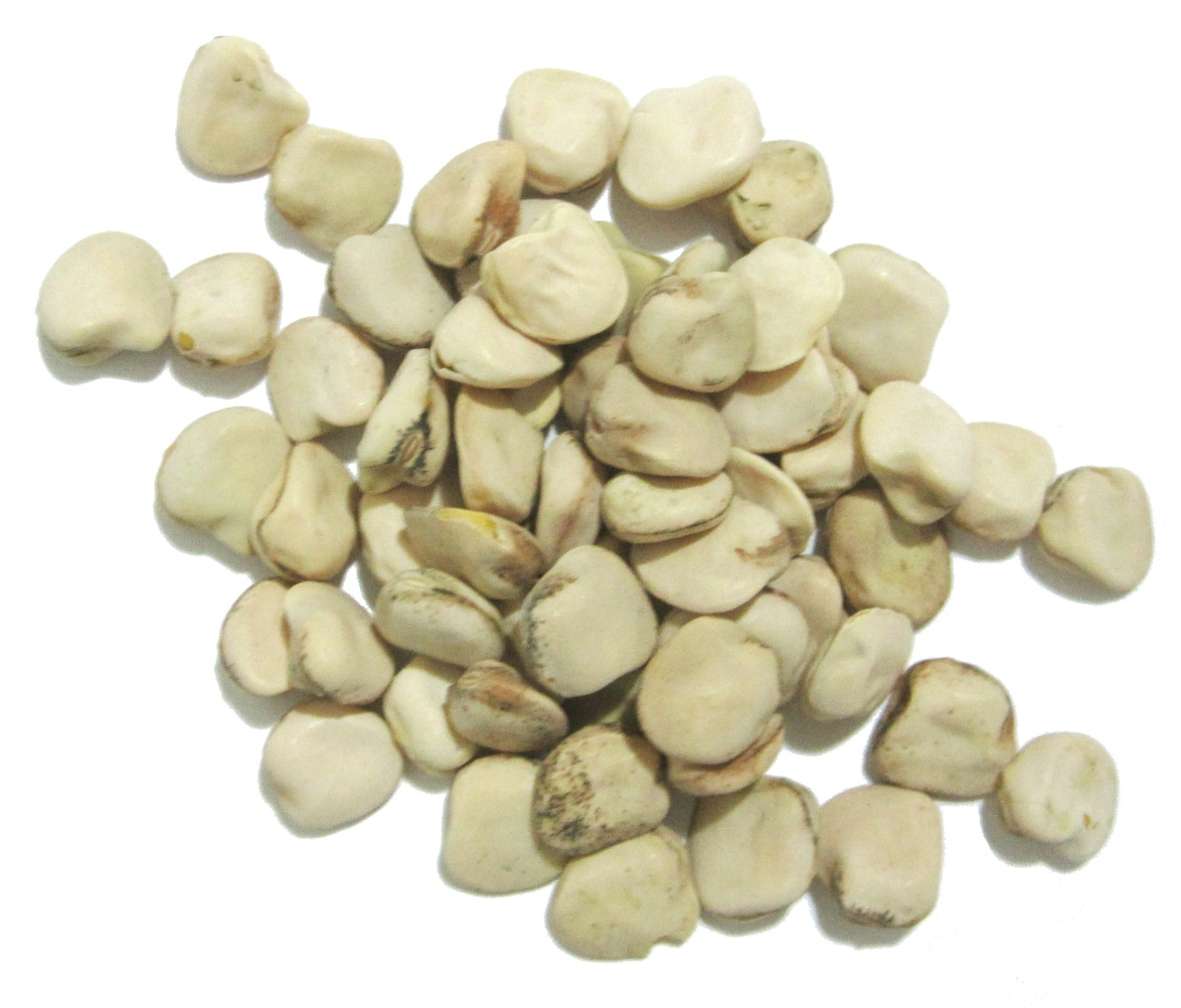
Lathyrus sativus seeds, dried

The grains of L. sativus contain variable amounts of the neurotoxic amino acid β-N-oxalyl-L-α,β-diaminopropionic acid (ODAP). ODAP is considered the cause of the disease neurolathyrism in humans and animals.

Neurolathyrism

Neurolathyrism or lathyrism is a chronic, progressive and irreversible neurodegenerative disease affecting motor neurons of the lower limbs. The disease is characterized by progressive spastic weakness of the lower limbs, which may eventually lead to the inability to walk. However, it has no impact on longevity or cognitive functions.

Epidemiology

The disease has historically occurred after famines in Europe (France, Spain, Germany), North Africa, and South Asia, and is still prevalent in Eritrea, Ethiopia, and Afghanistan (panhandle) when Lathyrus seed is the exclusive or main source of nutrients for extended periods.

Outbreaks have been reported when grass pea constituted a substantial proportion of the diet over extended periods, particularly during droughts and food shortages. One of the largest documented outbreaks occurred during the 1984–1985 Ethiopian famine in the Wollo region, where 2,542 cases of lathyrism were recorded following increased reliance on grass pea consumption. A survey conducted in northeastern Ethiopia in 2019 reported a lathyrism prevalence of 5.5%, indicating that the disease continues to be a public health concern in some communities where L. sativus remains an important food source. This has created a longstanding public health challenge in some food-insecure regions, where dependence on grass pea as a staple food may reduce the risk of starvation while increasing the risk of lathyrism.

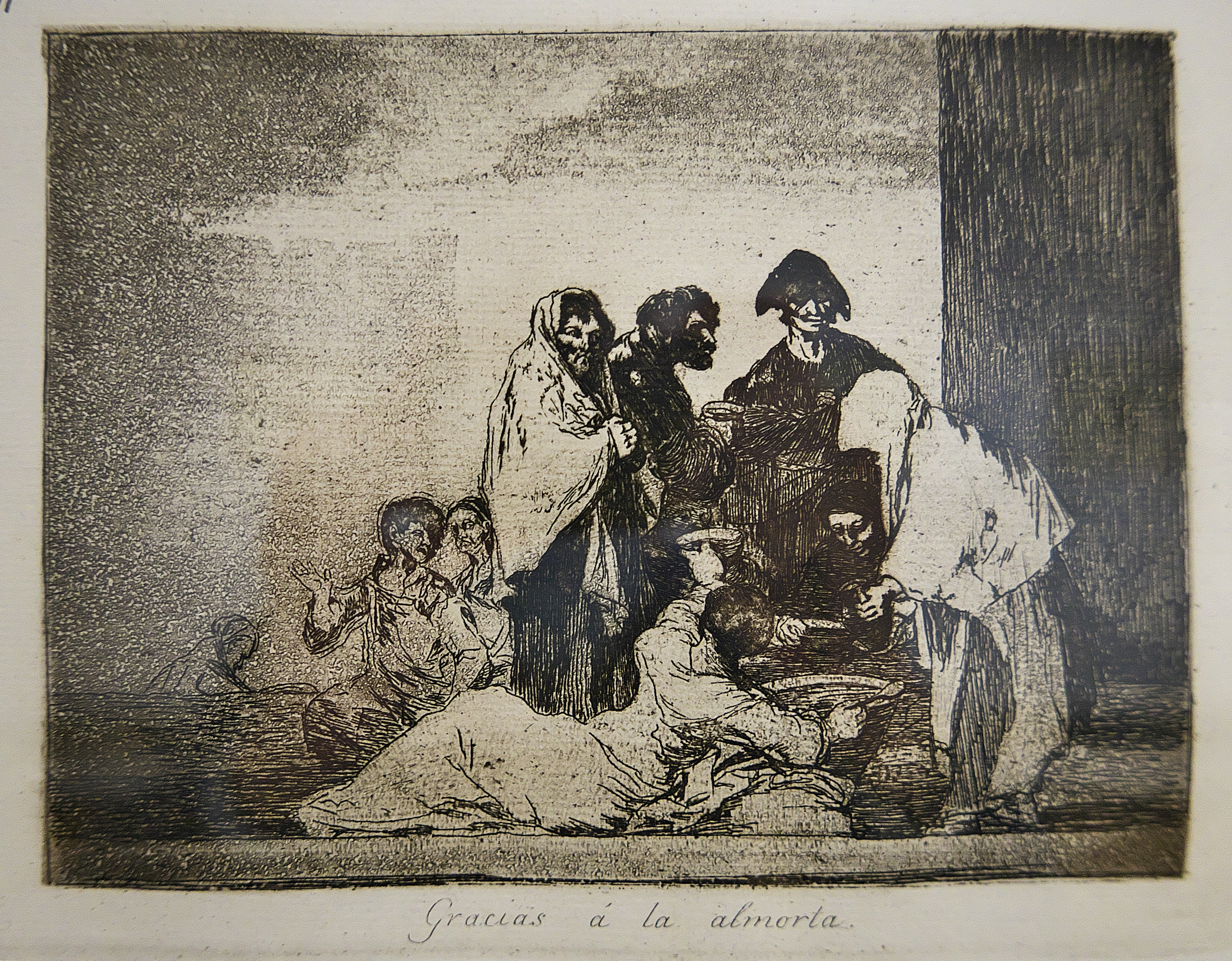
Gracias á la almorta, Goya print

Goya in his 1810–1815 The Disasters of War series illustrates the harm that can be done by excessive consumption of grass peas in times of famine in his print Gracias á la almorta (Thanks to the grass pea), about Napoleon's siege of Madrid. It depicts a woman who can no longer walk due to lathyrism, surrounded by starving people waiting for bowls of grass pea-based food. Grass-pea products were banned for sale for human consumption in Spain from 1967 to 2018, due to toxicity.

Molecular mechanism of ODAP

The neurotoxin ODAP enters the body with consumption of the grains. After the ODAP crosses the blood-brain barrier, it binds to AMPA-receptors in the spinal cord and cortex and activates them. This activation leads to an excessive calcium influx, which overstimulates neuronal pathways and induces oxidative stress in the central nervous system. This process may be exacerbated by glutathione depletion, which is associated with malnutrition. The progressive damage of motor neurons results in lathyrism's characteristic pattern of motor neuron loss.

Grass pea consumption during short periods does not automatically cause neurological symptoms. The risk arises from prolonged and monotonous exposure, particularly when L. sativus constitutes more than 30% to 40% of daily caloric intake for a period of 2 to 4 months.

The crop is harmless to humans in small quantities, but eating it as a major part of the diet over a three-month period can cause permanent paralysis below the knees in adults and brain damage in children, a disorder known as lathyrism. (Kew Gardens)

Some authors have argued that this toxicity is overstated, and L. sativus is harmless as part of a normal diet.

Neurolathyrism is likely underdiagnosed in affected regions because limited diagnostic resources, low awareness among healthcare workers, incomplete medical records, and misdiagnosis as other neurological disorders contribute to substantial underreporting.

ODAP concentration in Lathyrus sativus

The concentration of ODAP in Lathyrus sativus is influenced by both genetic and environmental factors. ODAP synthesis is associated with plant nitrogen and sulfur metabolism and has been reported to increase under environmental stress conditions, including drought, salinity, nutrient deficiency, and sulfur limitation. As a result, plants grown under adverse conditions may accumulate higher concentrations of the neurotoxin than those cultivated under more favourable conditions.

Strategies to reduce neurotoxicity

Exposure to ODAP can be reduced through the use of low-ODAP cultivars and traditional processing methods. Soaking, boiling, fermentation, dehulling, and germination have been shown to lower ODAP concentrations in seeds. These practices have long been used in regions where grass pea is consumed as a staple food.

== Breeding programs ==
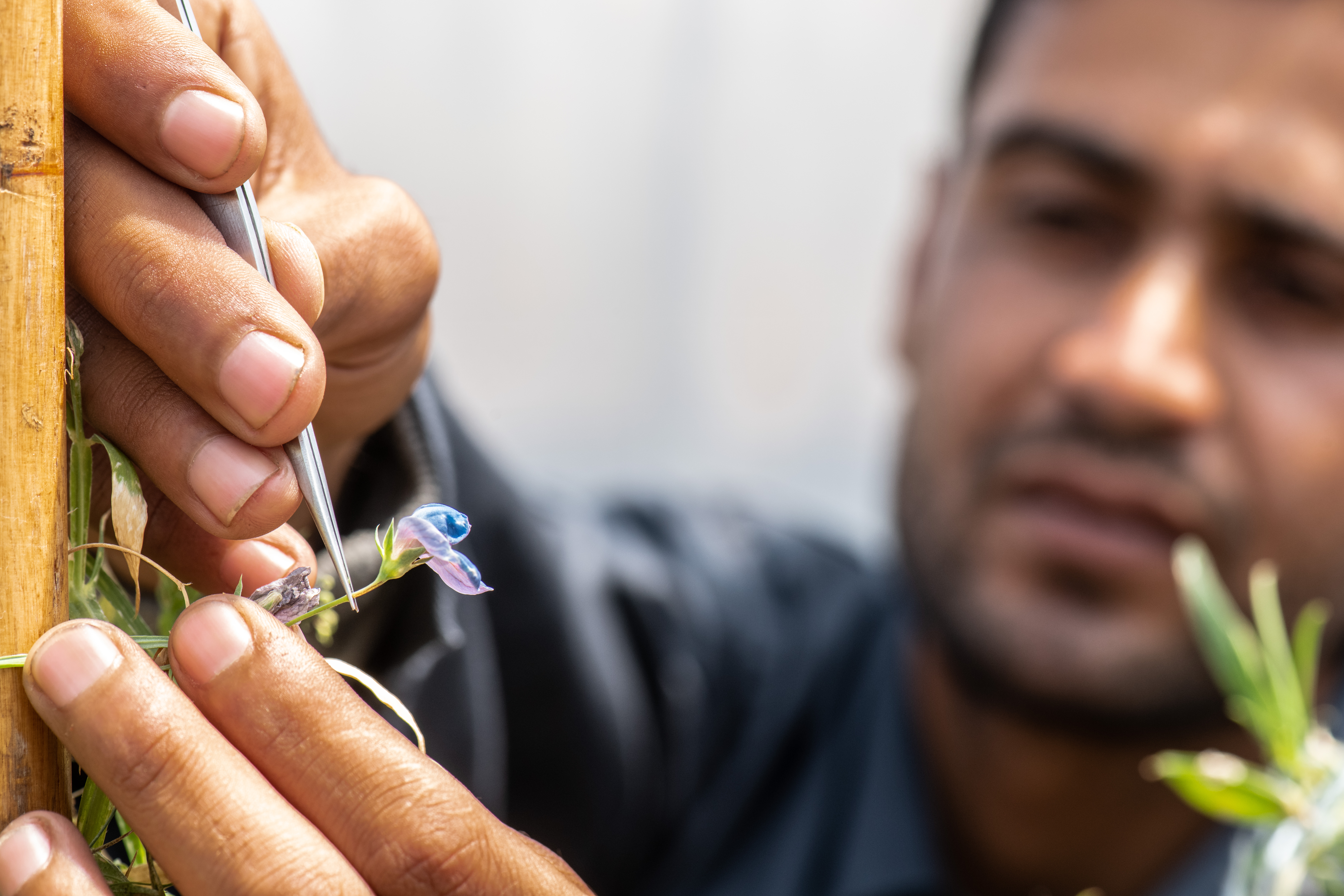
A grasspea breeder at International Center for Agricultural Research in the Dry Areas (ICARDA)'s facilities at Marchouch Station, Morocco. Photo: Michael Major/Crop Trust

Breeding programs are underway to produce lines of Lathyrus sativus that contain ODAP levels too low to be dangerous, while maintaining disease and insect resistance and tolerance to drought, heat, and salinity.

Certain varieties from western Asia have a low level of the neurotoxin and breeders and farmers are now exploring this genetic diversity to develop varieties that maintain the tolerance to extreme conditions, while at the same time achieving a safe level of the toxic compound.

Wild relatives are a prominent source of genetic material to improve cultivars. From 2016 to 2018, the International Center for Agricultural Research in the Dry Areas (ICARDA) evaluated wild relatives to explore genes for low or no ODAP and resistance/tolerance to biotic/abiotic stresses and transfer them to cultivated grass pea.
