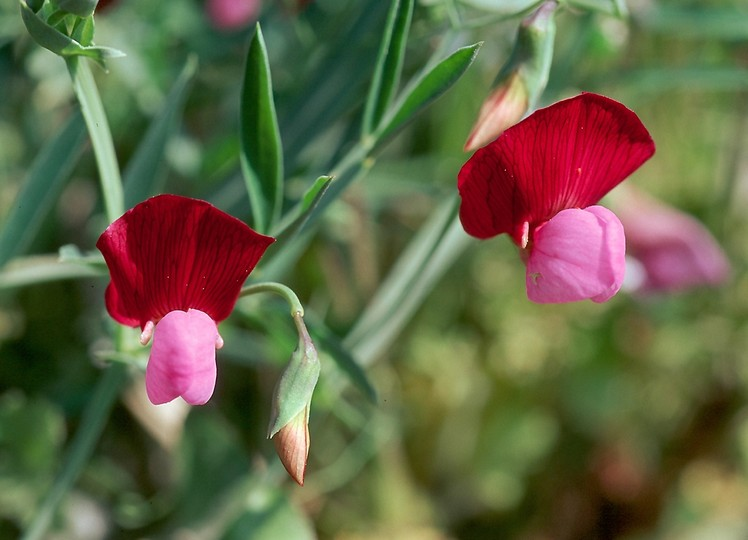

Scientific classification
- Kingdom: Plantae
- Clade: Tracheophytes
- Clade: Angiosperms
- Clade: Eudicots
- Clade: Rosids
- Order: Fabales
- Family: Fabaceae
- Subfamily: Faboideae
- Genus: Lathyrus
- Species: L. clymenum

Binomial name
- Lathyrus clymenum L.

Synonyms
- Lathyrus articulatus L.; Lathyrus clymensum L. [Spelling variant]

= Lathyrus clymenum =

Species of legume

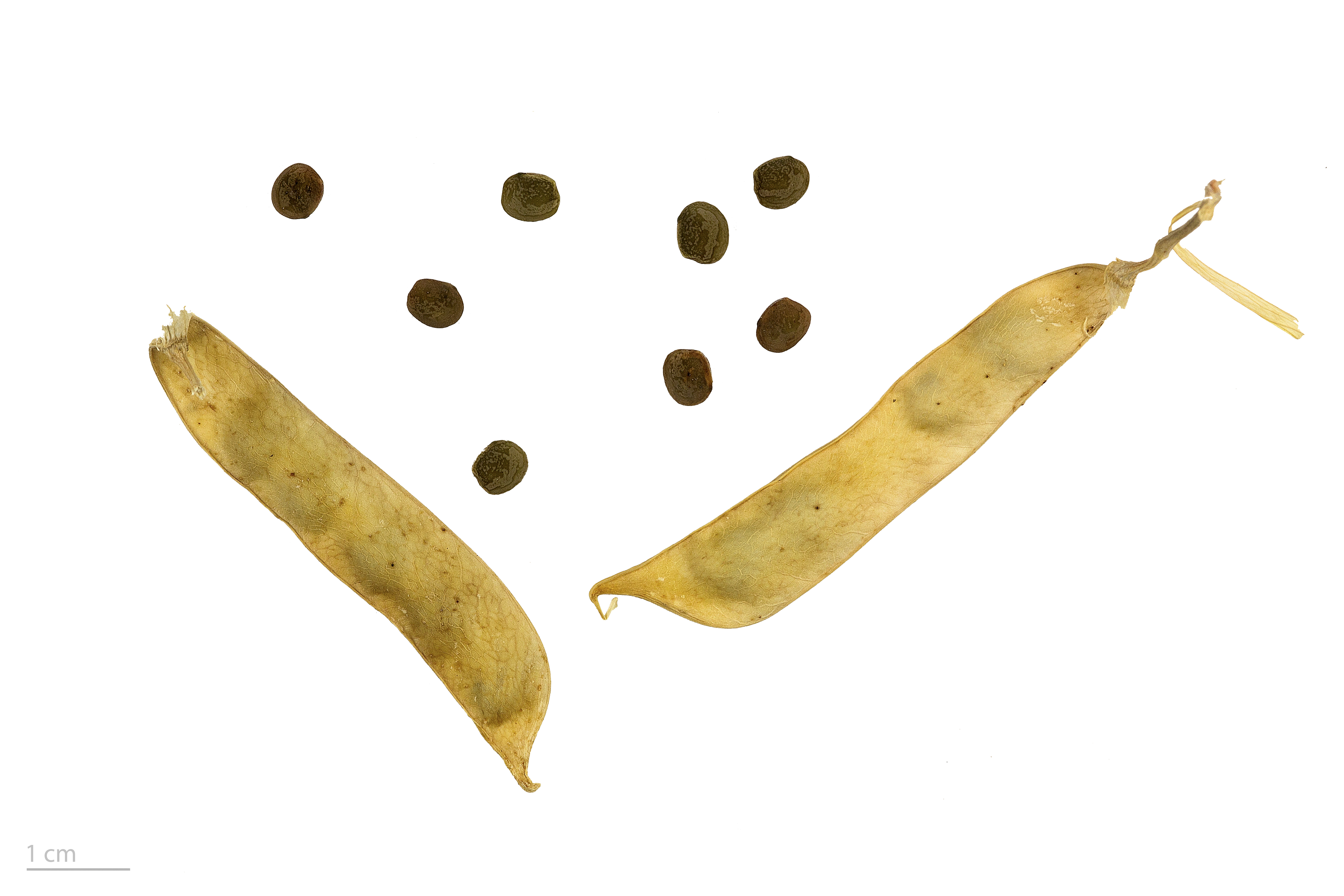
Lathyrus clymenum - MHNT

Lathyrus clymenum, also called Spanish vetchling, is a flowering plant in the family Fabaceae, native to the Mediterranean. The seeds are used to prepare a Greek dish called fava santorinis. The plant is cultivated on the island of Santorini in Greece and was recently added to the European Union's products with a Protected Designation of Origin.

For 3,500 years residents of Santorini and neighbouring islands have been cultivating the legume species Lathyrus clymenum, known elsewhere only as a wild plant. The peculiar ecosystem that was created by the volcanic explosions on Santorini island, the volcanic ash, the cellular soil, and the combination of humidity created by the sea and the drought, make the bean a unique resource. When weather conditions are good, farmers on the island can reap about 800 kilograms of beans per hectare. A vulnerable crop, it can be destroyed by strong winds that blow away its flowers before they can yield the pea, by drought or by a sudden heat wave almost instantly. Its production is thus limited, making it an expensive crop that costs €700 per acre. The cost for consumers is about €9–10 per kilogram.

== Fava santorinis ==
The cooked fava are mixed with chopped onion into a purée, typically served with chopped onion, olive oil and lemon juice.

== Nutrient content ==
The seeds of Lathyrus clymenum, from which fava Santorinis is made, has a very high protein content (25%) and is an excellent source of dietary fibre (26%). It is very low in fat, as most of its carbohydrates derive from complex carbohydrates and protein.

Although it looks like the Indian toor dal or chana dal, it is a completely different species with much higher nutritional value.

There is historical evidence that pulses and wild lentils in particular started being cultivated in Greece in 6,000 BCE. Lathyrus clymenum has been found in jars in the ruins of Akrotiri, Santorini, which date from approximately 1600 BCE. The Greek microclimate has been ideal for the evolution of such crops and the Greeks have mastered cooking them and benefited from their high nutritional value throughout history.
