= Oxalyldiaminopropionic acid =

- Stereo, skeletal formula of oxalyldiaminopropionic acid (S)

Names
- Systematic IUPAC name (2S)-2-Amino-3-(oxaloamino)propanoic acid
- Other names: Dencichin; β-Oxalylaminoalanine; β-N-Oxalyl-α,β-diaminopropionic acid; β-N-oxalylamino-L-alanine (L-BOAA)

Identifiers
CAS Number	7554-90-7; 5302-45-4 (S)
3D model (JSmol)	Interactive image
Abbreviations	BOAA; ODAP; β-ODAP
ChEBI	CHEBI:16399
ChemSpider	389238 (S); 2270 (rac)
KEGG	C04209
MeSH	oxalyldiaminopropionic+acid
PubChem CID	2360; 440259 (S)
UNII	1TG777QI25; O8VT5BZ48B (S)
CompTox Dashboard (EPA)	DTXSID90967517
- InChI: InChI=1S/C5H8N2O5/c6-2(4(9)10)1-7-3(8)5(11)12/h2H,1,6H2,(H,7,8)(H,9,10)(H,11,12)/t2-/m0/s1 Key: NEEQFPMRODQIKX-REOHCLBHSA-N
- SMILES: C([C@@H](C(=O)O)N)NC(=O)C(=O)O

Properties
Chemical formula	C_{5}H_{8}N_{2}O_{5}
Molar mass	176.128 g·mol^{−1}

Related compounds
Related compounds	Beta-Methylamino-L-alanine
- Except where otherwise noted, data are given for materials in their standard state (at 25 °C [77 °F], 100 kPa). verify (what is ?) Infobox references

Oxalyldiaminopropionic acid (ODAP) is a structural analogue of the neurotransmitter glutamate found in the grass pea Lathyrus sativus. It is the neurotoxin responsible for the motor neuron degeneration syndrome lathyrism.

== Sources ==
ODAP is found in the seeds of the legume L. sativus, a grass pea plant, in the range of 0.5% w/w. L. sativus can be found in areas of Southern, Central, and Eastern Europe, the Mediterranean Basin, Iraq and Afghanistan as well as areas of Asia and Africa.

== History ==
In some regions, including the Indian subcontinent, Bangladesh, Ethiopia and Nepal, the grass pea has become a staple food item. The plant has a high tolerance of environmental conditions which results in it being the only available food source in times of famine or drought. Following these several month droughts, neurolathyrism epidemics may occur. The last instance of such an epidemic (as of 2013) was in Ethiopia during the 1995-1997 drought during which 2,000 people became permanently disabled.

== Biological effects ==
ODAP is an agonist of the ionotropic AMPA glutamate receptor. It is known to cause neurolathyrism in humans, a motor neuron degenerative disease characterized by degeneration of pyramidal-tract neurons in the spinal cord and in the area of the cortex controlling the legs, resulting in lower-body paralysis. There is not one direct explanation as to how ODAP causes neurolathyrism; however, there has been evidence to support a few biological effects. One reason why the mechanism of action is not entirely clear may be because, so far, a good animal model for the effect of ODAP in humans has not been found. The LD_{50} is also unknown.

=== Excitotoxicity ===
ODAP activates AMPA receptors which can induce excitotoxicity, or overstimulation of glutamate receptors. The release of too much glutamate, either at once or over a prolonged period of time, will lead to increased levels of Ca^{2+} in the cytoplasm. Since Ca^{2+} is the signaling ion for the release of glutamate into the synapse, this can result in potentiation of the glutamate release cycle and the spread of excitotoxic damage to neighboring neurons. Inside the neuron, the extra Ca^{2+} will leave the cytoplasm and enter either the mitochondria or the endoplasmic reticulum (ER), which can lead to the accumulation of misfolded or unfolded proteins in the ER and ultimately cell death in both cases. In addition to acting as an agonist, there is evidence to show that ODAP is transported into the cell by an antiporter that simultaneously transports glutamate into the synapse.

=== Oxidative stress ===
The second biological effect of ODAP is oxidative stress. Reactive oxygen species (ROS) are generated in the mitochondria during metabolism, and the body has mechanisms in place to neutralize these molecules before they cause damage. Oxidative stress results from a disturbance in the normal functioning of these pathways. One antioxidant in the neutralizing pathway is glutathione (GSH), whose synthesis requires the sulfur-containing amino acids methionine and cysteine as precursors. It is thought that ODAP, possibly due to the induced excitotoxicity, reduces the intake of cysteine through its antiporter. This inhibits the synthesis of GSH, leading to an increased production of ROS and mitochondrial damage. Motor neurons may be the most sensitive to ODAP poisoning because they exhibit a greater dependency on the GSH precursor methionine. Further, L. sativus, as a food, is deficient in sulfur-containing amino acids, enhancing the receptor-level effects of ODAP on the production of GSH when ingested.

== Synthesis ==
=== Biosynthesis ===
In L. sativus ODAP is synthesized in the young seedlings from the precursor (β-isoxazolin-5-on-2-yl)-alanine, also known as BIA. BIA has not been detected in mature plant parts or ripening seeds. The pathway begins with the formation of BIA from O-acetyl-L-serine (OAS) and isoxazolin-5-on. A ring opening leads to the formation of the short-lived intermediate 2,3-L-diaminopropanoic acid (DAPRO) which is then oxalylized by oxalyl-coenzyme A to form ODAP.

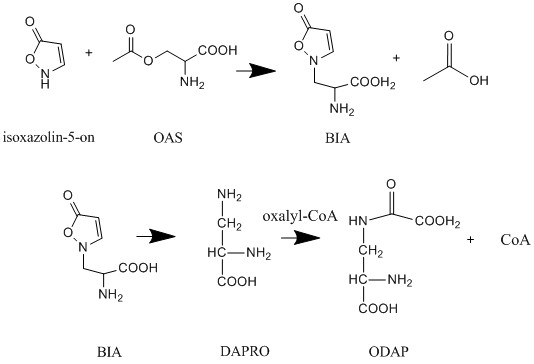
The biosynthesis pathway of ODAP in L. sativus.

=== Chemical synthesis ===
ODAP can be synthesized from L-α,β-diaminopropionic acid and dimethyl oxalate at a pH of 4.5-5. Cupric oxide can be used to temporarily protect the α-NH2 group of the L-α,β-diaminoproprionic acid during the reaction.

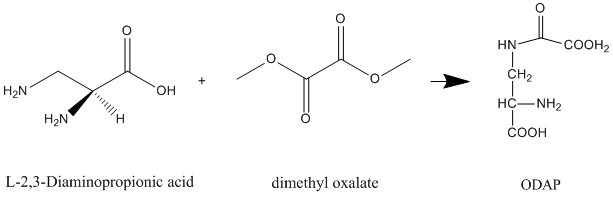

== See also ==
- β-Methylamino-L-alanine, a related toxin
