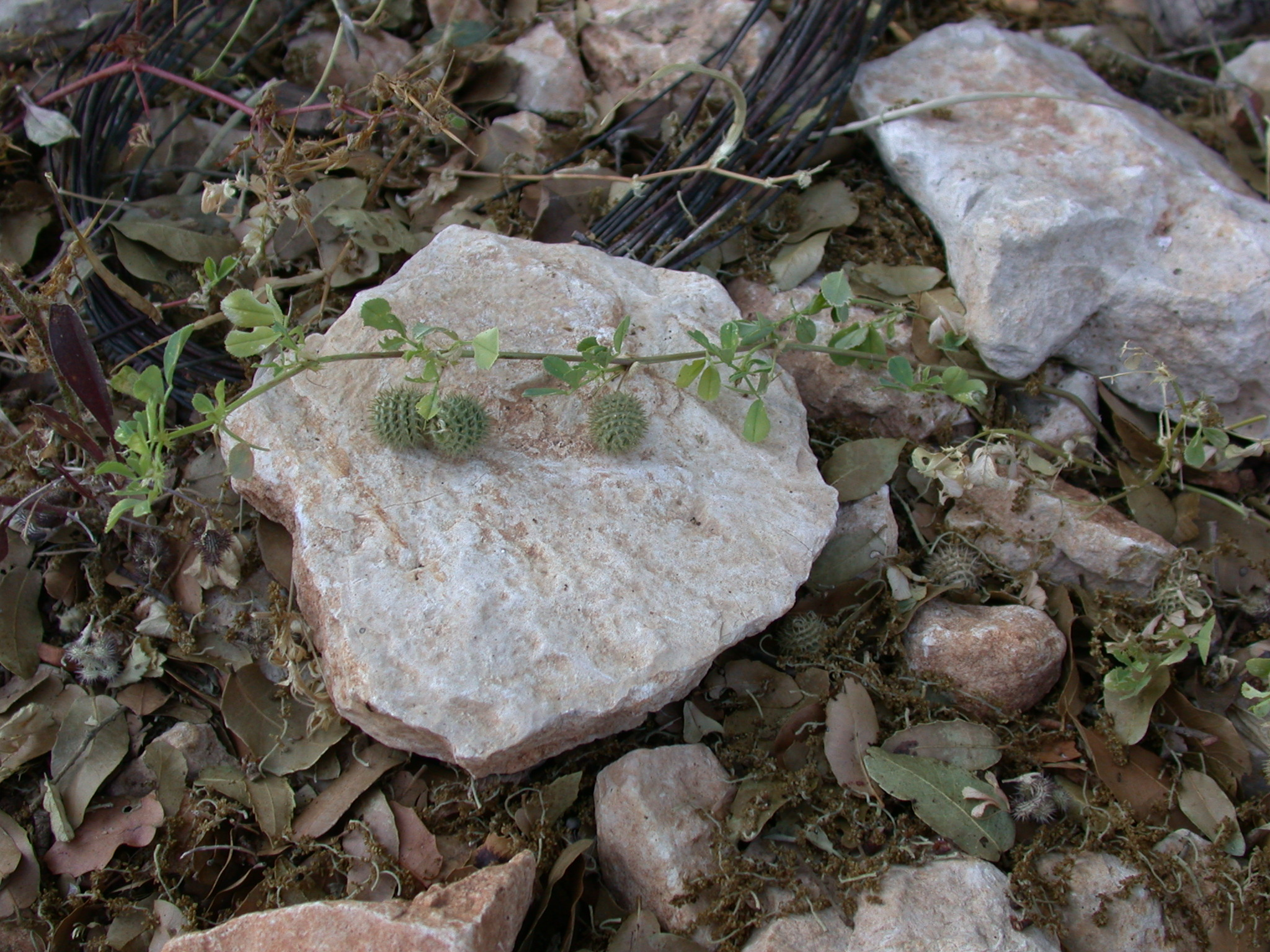

Scientific classification
- Kingdom: Plantae
- Clade: Tracheophytes
- Clade: Angiosperms
- Clade: Eudicots
- Clade: Rosids
- Order: Fabales
- Family: Fabaceae
- Subfamily: Faboideae
- Genus: Medicago
- Species: M. ciliaris

Binomial name
- Medicago ciliaris (L.) Krock.

= Medicago ciliaris =

Species of legume

Medicago ciliaris, the ciliate medick, is a plant species of the genus Medicago. It is found throughout the Mediterranean basin. It forms a symbiotic relationship with the bacterium Sinorhizobium medicae, which is capable of nitrogen fixation. It is considered by some to be a subspecies of Medicago intertexta.
