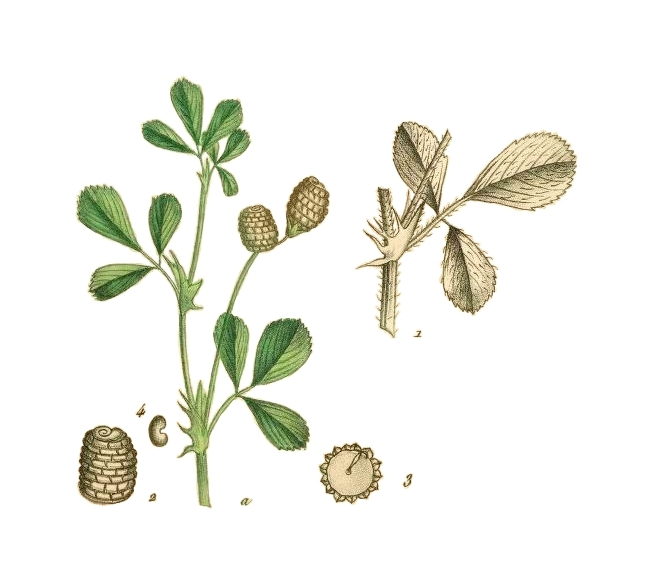

Conservation status
- Least Concern (IUCN 3.1)

Scientific classification
- Kingdom: Plantae
- Clade: Tracheophytes
- Clade: Angiosperms
- Clade: Eudicots
- Clade: Rosids
- Order: Fabales
- Family: Fabaceae
- Subfamily: Faboideae
- Genus: Medicago
- Species: M. turbinata

Binomial name
- Medicago turbinata (L.) All.

Synonyms
- Medicago polymorpha var. tuberculata Retz. Medicago polymorpha var. turbinata L. Medicago spinulosa DC; Medicago tuberculata (Retz.) Willd.

= Medicago turbinata =

Species of legume

Medicago turbinata, the Southern medick, is a plant species of the genus Medicago It is found throughout the Mediterranean basin. It forms a symbiotic relationship with the bacterium Sinorhizobium medicae, which is capable of nitrogen fixation. An unidentified lectin isolated from M. turbinata has shown limited usefulness as a phytohaemagglutinin. The seed weight is 4.66 pounds.

== Gallery ==
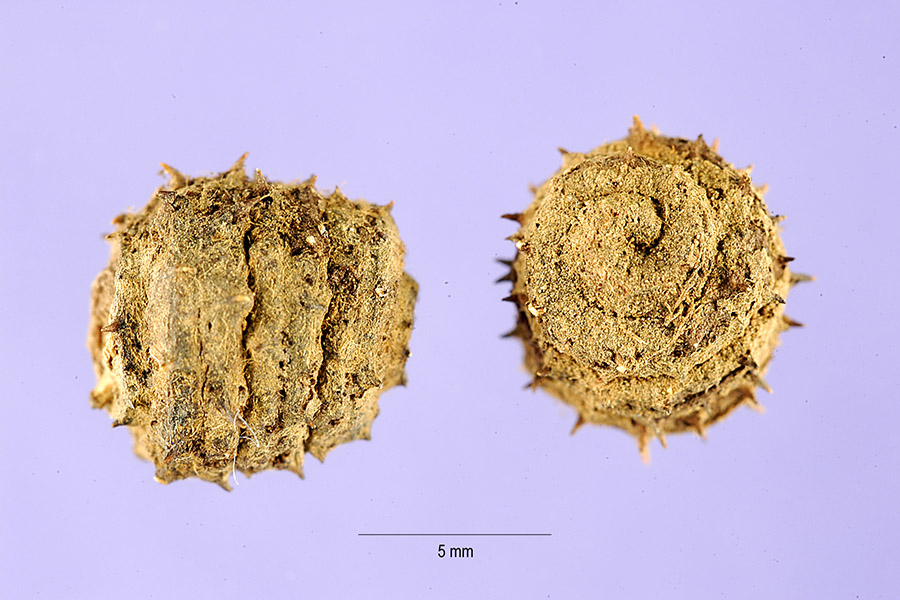
seed pods

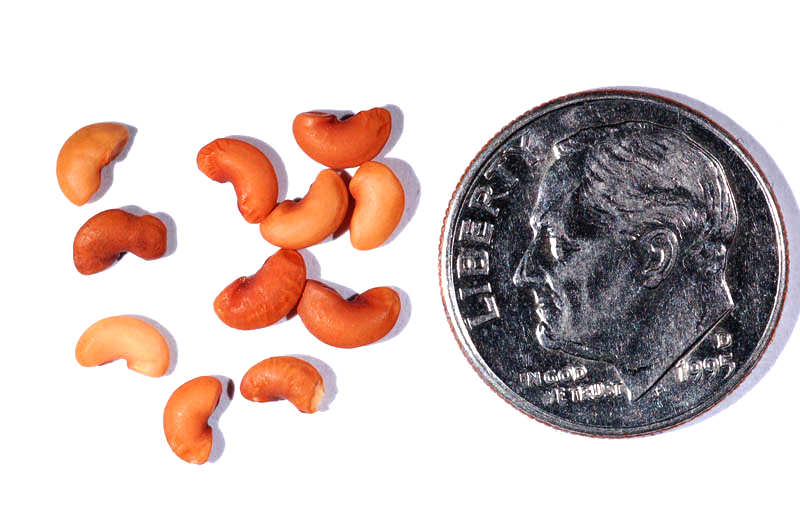
seeds
