= Coleophora hospitiella =

Scientific classification
- Kingdom: Animalia
- Phylum: Arthropoda
- Class: Insecta
- Order: Lepidoptera
- Family: Coleophoridae
- Genus: Coleophora
- Species: C. hospitiella

Binomial name
- Coleophora hospitiella Chrétien, 1915

Synonyms
- Coleophora fuscostraminella Toll, 1956; Coleophora richteri Toll, 1959

Species of moth

Coleophora hospitiella is a moth of the family Coleophoridae. It is found on the Canary Islands (Tenerife, La Gomera, Fuerteventura), North Africa (including Libya and Tunisia), Saudi Arabia, Iran, Afghanistan and Uzbekistan.

The larvae feed on Medicago laciniata.
