= Medicago murex =

Scientific classification
- Kingdom: Plantae
- Clade: Tracheophytes
- Clade: Angiosperms
- Clade: Eudicots
- Clade: Rosids
- Order: Fabales
- Family: Fabaceae
- Subfamily: Faboideae
- Genus: Medicago
- Species: M. murex

Binomial name
- Medicago murex Willd.

Synonyms
- Medicago lesinsii F. Small; Medicago murex subsp. sphaerocarpos (Bertol.) K. A. Lesins & I. Lesins; Medicago sicula Tod. Medicago sorrentinii Tod. Medicago sphaerocarpos Bertol.

Species of legume

Medicago murex, the spiny medick, is a plant species of the genus Medicago. It is found throughout the Mediterranean basin. It forms a symbiotic relationship with the bacterium Sinorhizobium medicae, which is capable of nitrogen fixation.
