= Cotes Grassland =

Protected area in Cotes, Leicestershire, England

Coordinates: 52.781°N 1.181°W

- Site of Special Scientific Interest
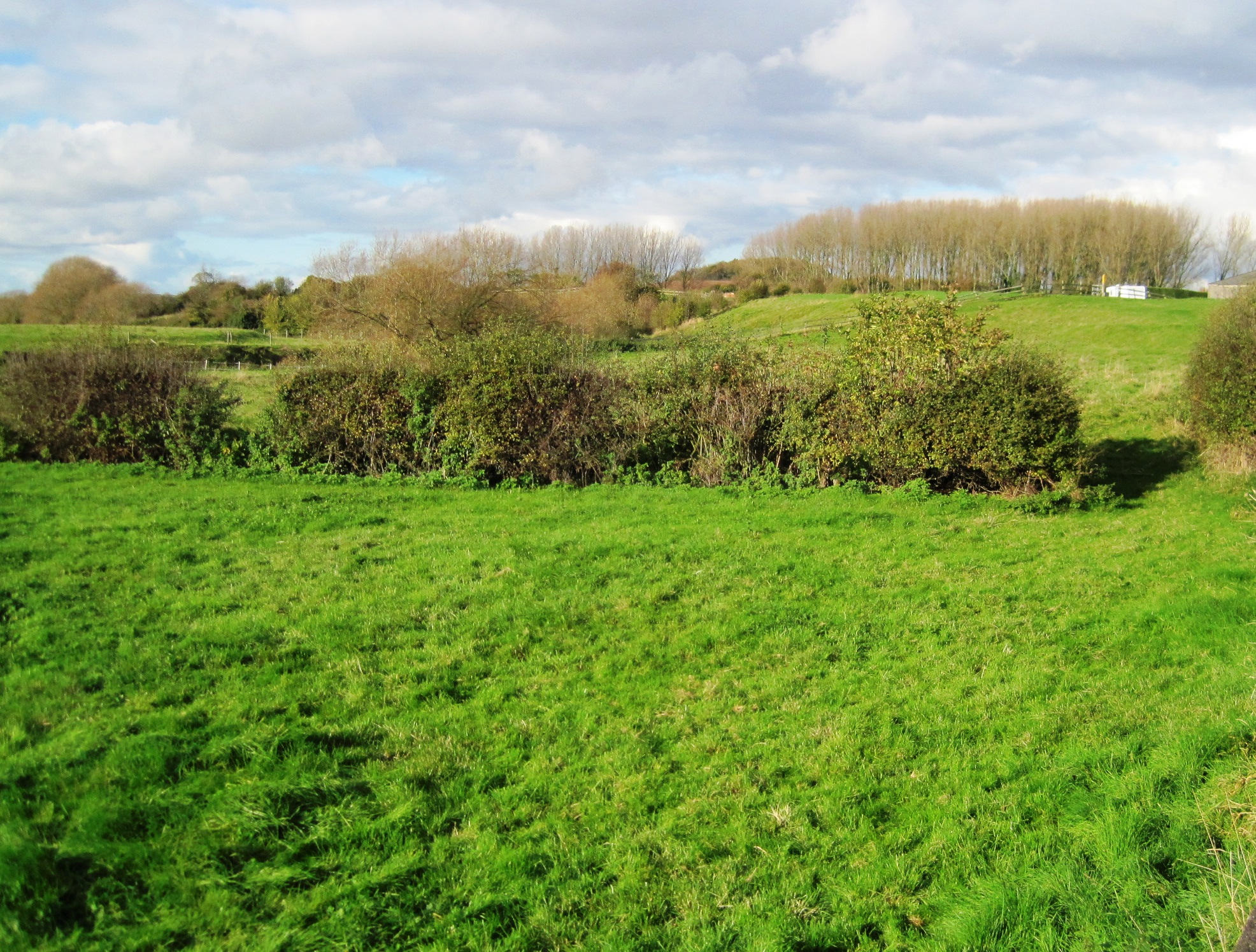
- Location of Cotes Grassland.
- Area of search: Leicestershire
- Grid reference: SK 553 208
- Interest: Biological
- Area: 3.3 hectares
- Notification date: 1983
- Location map: Magic Map

Cotes Grassland is a 3.3-hectare (8.2-acre) biological Site of Special Scientific Interest in Cotes in Leicestershire.

This meadow on the bank of the River Soar has a thin soil on alluvial river gravels. It has several plants which are uncommon in the Midlands, such as soft trefoil, spotted medick, knotted hedge-parsley, wild clary and subterranean trefoil.

There is access by a public footpath which crosses the site.
