= Medicago rotata =

Scientific classification
- Kingdom: Plantae
- Clade: Embryophytes
- Clade: Tracheophytes
- Clade: Spermatophytes
- Clade: Angiosperms
- Clade: Eudicots
- Clade: Rosids
- Order: Fabales
- Family: Fabaceae
- Subfamily: Faboideae
- Genus: Medicago
- Species: M. rotata

Binomial name
- Medicago rotata Boiss.

Synonyms
- Medicago rotata subsp. eliezeri (Eig) Ponert

Species of flowering plant

Medicago rotata is a species of flowering plant in the Fabaceae family. It is found throughout the eastern Mediterranean from Turkey to Israel. It forms a symbiotic relationship with the bacterium Sinorhizobium medicae, which is capable of nitrogen fixation.

== Gallery ==
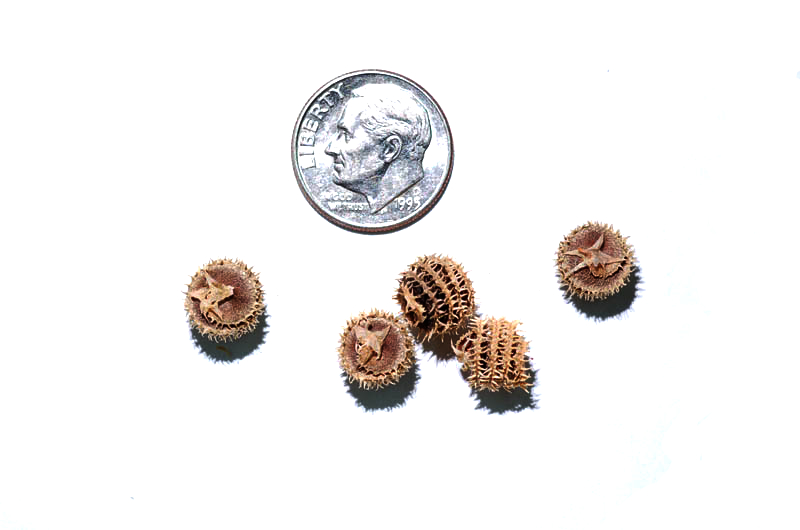
Pods

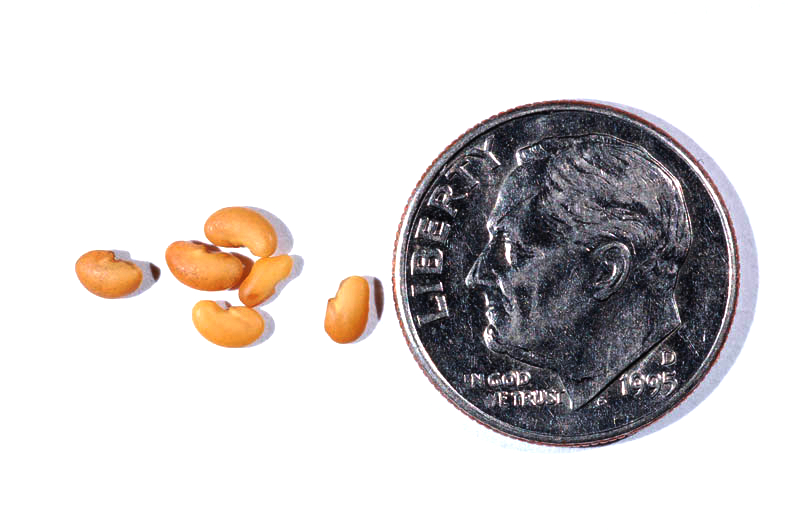
Seeds
