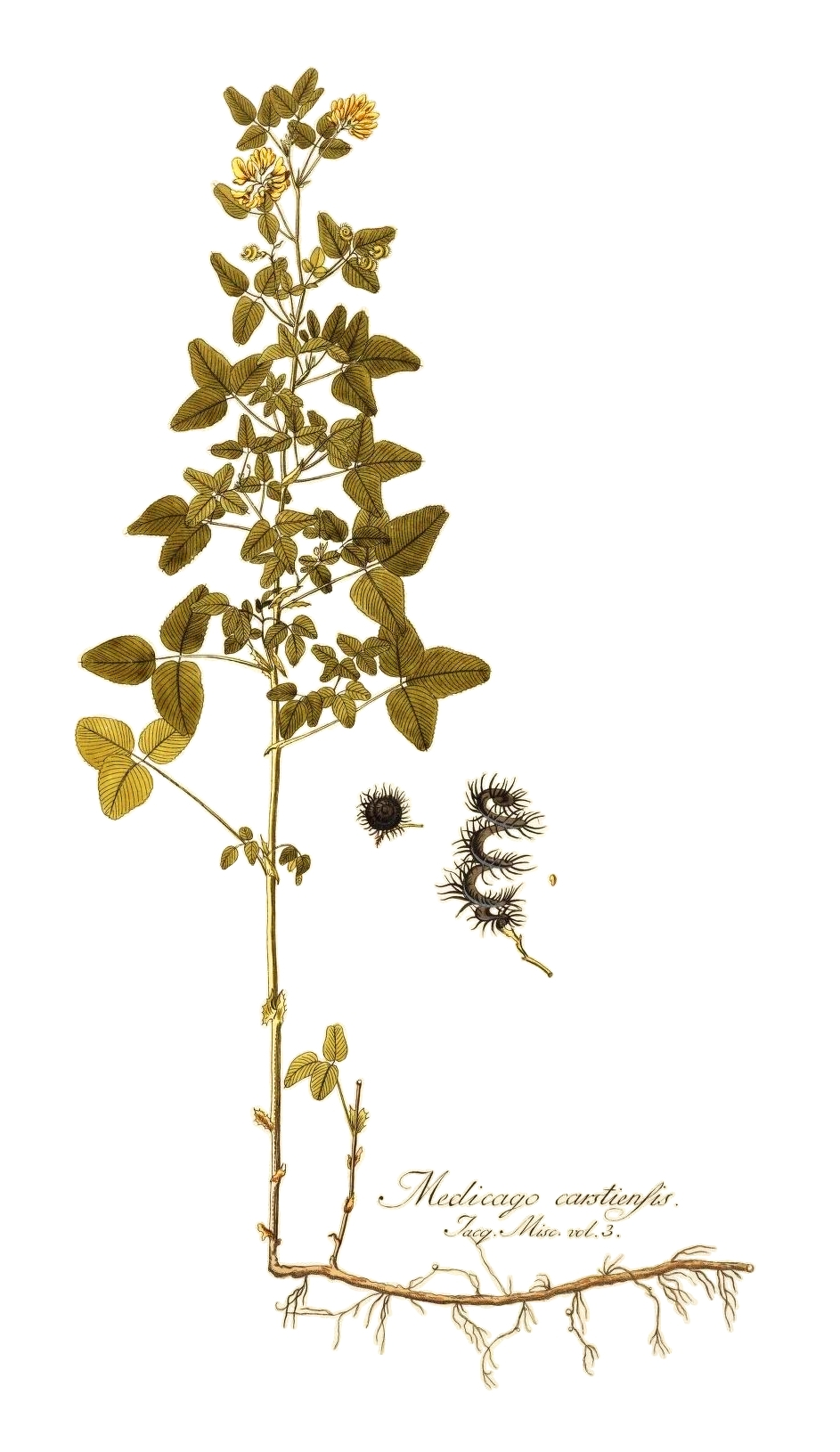

Scientific classification
- Kingdom: Plantae
- Clade: Embryophytes
- Clade: Tracheophytes
- Clade: Spermatophytes
- Clade: Angiosperms
- Clade: Eudicots
- Clade: Rosids
- Order: Fabales
- Family: Fabaceae
- Subfamily: Faboideae
- Genus: Medicago
- Species: M. carstiensis

Binomial name
- Medicago carstiensis Wulfen

= Medicago carstiensis =

Species of flowering plant

Medicago carstiensis is a plant species of the genus Medicago. It is found around the Adriatic Sea.
