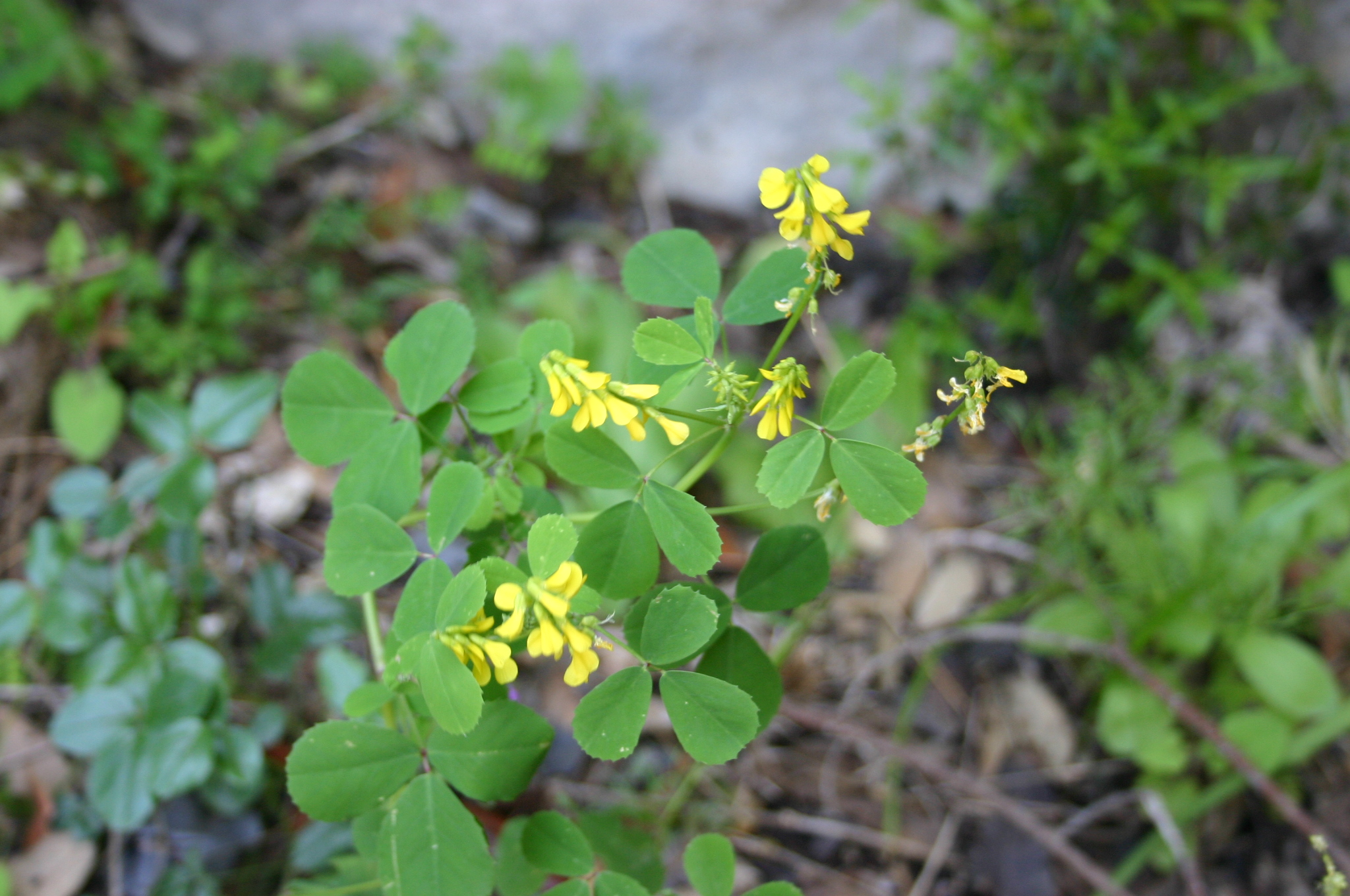
- Medicago suffruticosa

Scientific classification
- Kingdom: Plantae
- Clade: Tracheophytes
- Clade: Angiosperms
- Clade: Eudicots
- Clade: Rosids
- Order: Fabales
- Family: Fabaceae
- Subfamily: Faboideae
- Genus: Medicago
- Species: M. suffruticosa

Binomial name
- Medicago suffruticosa Ramond ex DC.

= Medicago suffruticosa =

Species of plant

Medicago suffruticosa is a species of plant from the family Fabaceae in the genus Medicago.

== Description ==
Small prostrated plant with light green leaves and yellow flowers. The seedpods grow in a spiral shape.

== Range ==
It is found in southern France, Spain and northern Morocco.

== Taxonomy ==
Medicago suffruticosa contains the following subspecies:

- Medicago suffruticosa subsp. leiocarpa
- Medicago suffruticosa subsp. suffruticosa
