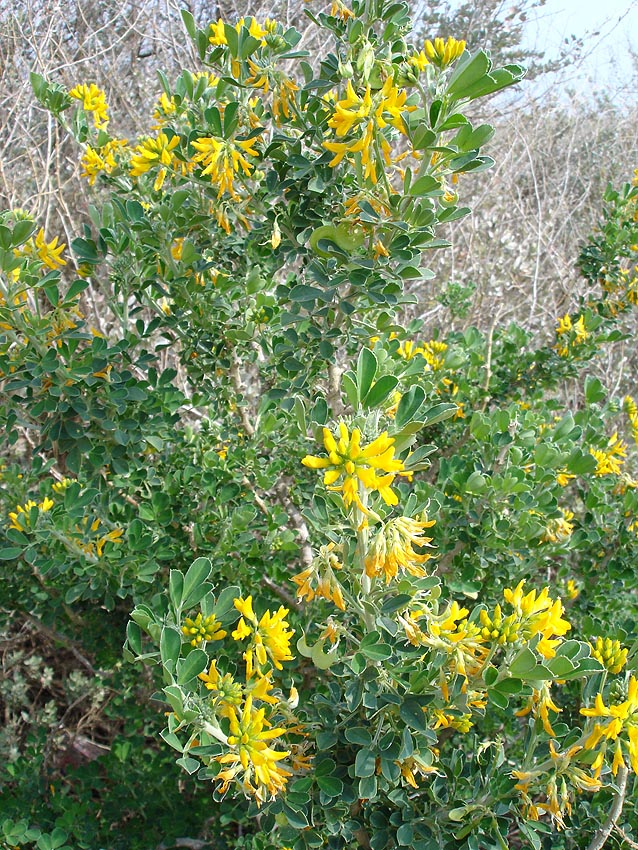

Scientific classification
- Kingdom: Plantae
- Clade: Tracheophytes
- Clade: Angiosperms
- Clade: Eudicots
- Clade: Rosids
- Order: Fabales
- Family: Fabaceae
- Subfamily: Faboideae
- Genus: Medicago
- Species: M. arborea

Binomial name
- Medicago arborea L. (1753)

Subspecies
- 3; see text

Synonyms
- Medica arborea (L.) Mill. (1768); Rhodusia arborea (L.) Vassilcz. (1972); Trigonella arborea (L.) Vassilcz. (1953)

= Medicago arborea =

Species of flowering plant in the legume family

Medicago arborea is a flowering plant species in the pea and bean family, Fabaceae. Common names include moon trefoil, shrub medick, alfalfa arborea, and tree medick.

== Description ==
The shrub is 1–4 metres (3–13 ft) high and wide and is pale yellow in colour. Its stems are erect and terete while its stipules are triangular and 5–8 millimetres (1/4–3/8 in) long. Its petioles are 2–4 centimetres (3/4–1 1/2 in) long with obovate to obcordate leaflets.

Flowers are scattered in 6–10 racemes and are 2–2.5 cm (3/4–1 in) long with axillar peduncles which are 3–5 cm (1 1/4–2 in). The corolla is of orange colour and is 12–15 mm (1/2–5/8 in). The bracts are 2 mm (1/8 in) long while its pedicels are 5 mm (1/4 in) long. Its legume is coiled in 0.5 to 1.5 spirals which are 12–15 mm (1/2–5/8 in) wide and are pubescent at the center. The seeds are 4 mm (1/8 in) long.

M. arborea is sometimes misidentified as Cytisus, which it resembles.

== Subspecies ==
Three subspecies are accepted.

- Medicago arborea subsp. arborea (synonyms Cytisus neapolitanus Cohen-Stuart and Medicago arborescens C.Presl) – Spain, Balearic Islands, Italy, Sardinia, Sicily, Greece, Crete, East Aegean Islands, and Turkey
- Medicago arborea subsp. citrina (Font Quer) O.Bolòs & Vigo (synonyms M. arborea var. citrina Font Quer and Medicago citrina (Font Quer) Greuter – eastern Spain and Balearic Islands
- Medicago arborea subsp. strasseri (Greuter, Matthäs & Risse) Sobr.-Vesp. & Ceresuela (synonym Medicago strasseri Greuter, Matthäs & Risse) – Crete

== Distribution and habitat ==
It is native to several Mediterranean Basin countries – Spain and the Balearic Islands, Italy including and Sardinia and Sicily, Greece including Crete and the East Aegean Islands, and Turkey. It primarily grows on rocky shores among shrubby vegetation.

== Ecology ==
It forms a symbiotic relationship with the bacterium Sinorhizobium meliloti, which is capable of nitrogen fixation.

== Uses ==
It is the only member of the genus Medicago which is used as an ornamental.
