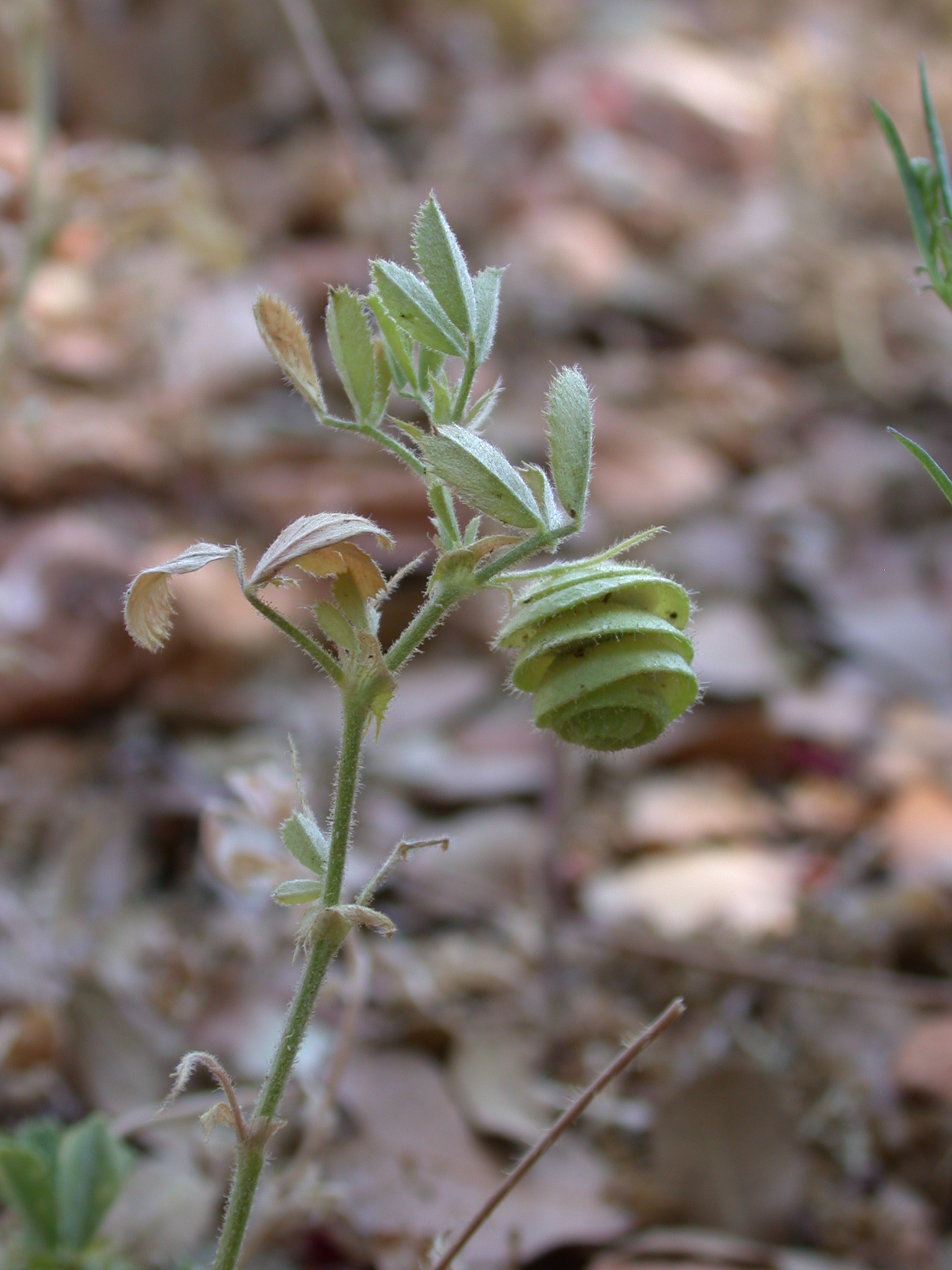

Scientific classification
- Kingdom: Plantae
- Clade: Tracheophytes
- Clade: Angiosperms
- Clade: Eudicots
- Clade: Rosids
- Order: Fabales
- Family: Fabaceae
- Subfamily: Faboideae
- Genus: Medicago
- Species: M. scutellata

Binomial name
- Medicago scutellata (L.) Mill.

Synonyms
- Medicago polymorpha var. scutellata L.

= Medicago scutellata =

Species of legume

Medicago scutellata is a plant species of the genus Medicago. It is found throughout the Mediterranean basin. It forms a symbiotic relationship with the bacterium Sinorhizobium meliloti, which is capable of nitrogen fixation. Common names include snail medick and shield medick.

== Gallery ==
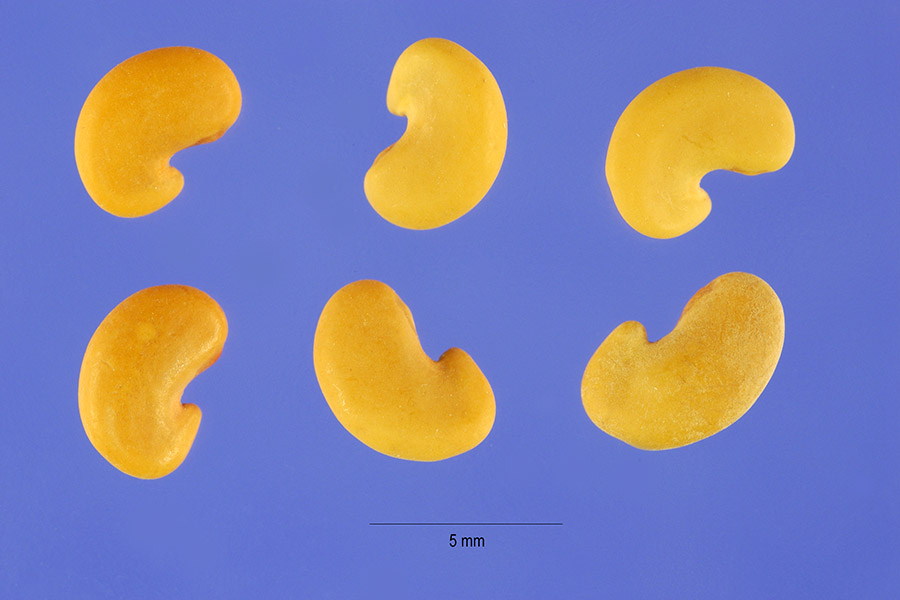
Seeds compared to a 5-mm imaginary line.

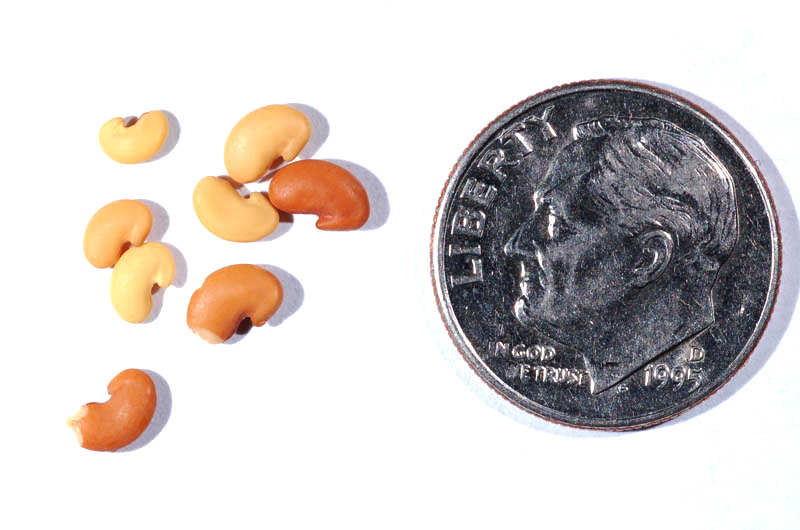
Seeds compared to a coin.
