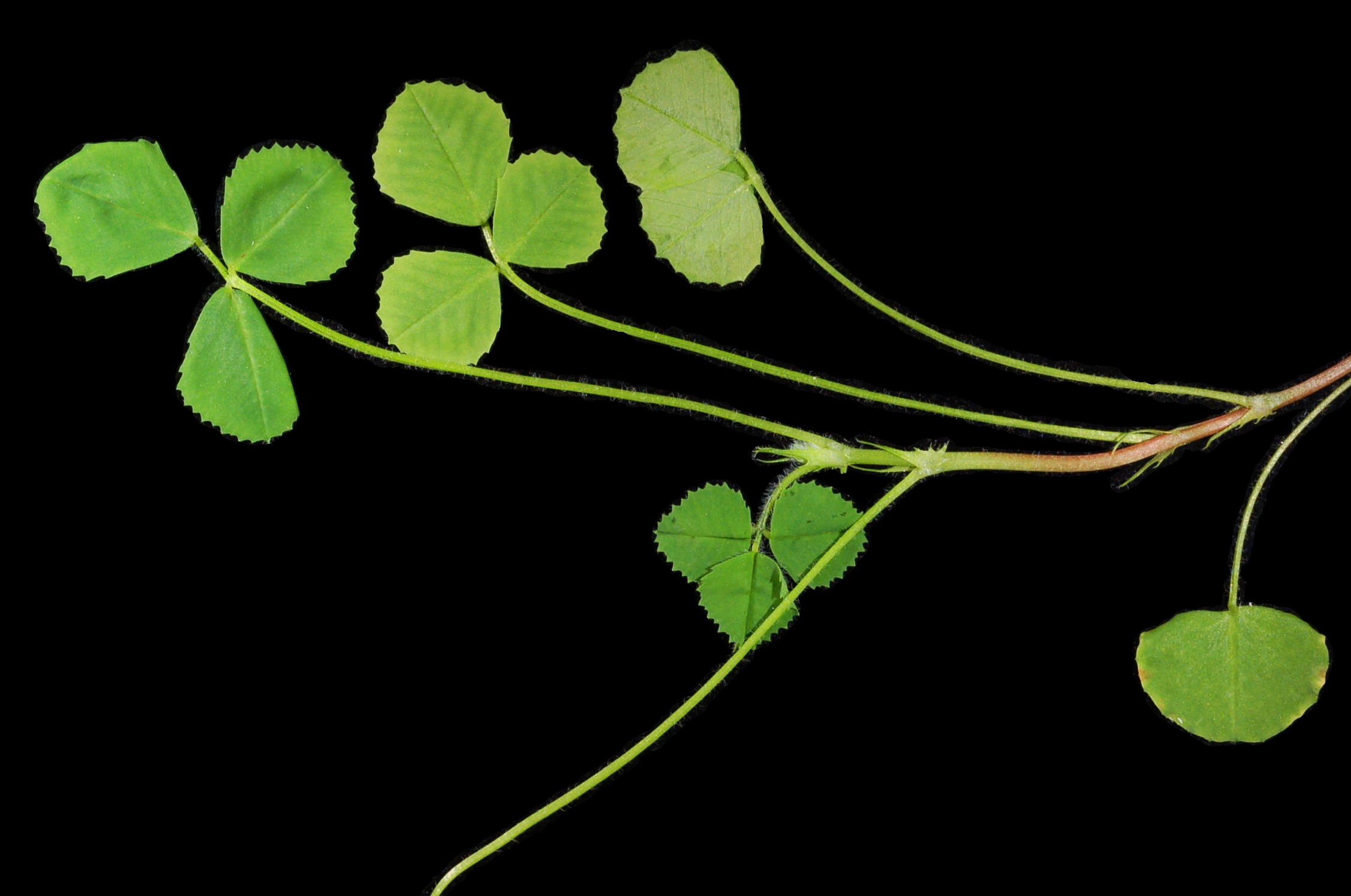

Scientific classification
- Kingdom: Plantae
- Clade: Tracheophytes
- Clade: Angiosperms
- Clade: Eudicots
- Clade: Rosids
- Order: Fabales
- Family: Fabaceae
- Subfamily: Faboideae
- Genus: Medicago
- Species: M. italica

Binomial name
- Medicago italica

Synonyms
- Medicago tornata

= Medicago italica =

Species of plant

Medicago italica is a species of in the family Fabaceae.

== Sources ==
This article incorporates text from a free content work. Licensed under CC0 (license statement/permission). Text taken from Medicago italica. Encyclopedia of Life.
