= Medicago radiata =

Scientific classification
- Kingdom: Plantae
- Clade: Embryophytes
- Clade: Tracheophytes
- Clade: Spermatophytes
- Clade: Angiosperms
- Clade: Eudicots
- Clade: Rosids
- Order: Fabales
- Family: Fabaceae
- Subfamily: Faboideae
- Genus: Medicago
- Species: M. radiata

Binomial name
- Medicago radiata L.

Synonyms
- Trigonella radiata (L.) Boiss.

Species of flowering plant

Medicago radiata, the ray-podded medick, is a plant species of the genus Medicago. It is found throughout the eastern Mediterranean and in Asia. It forms a symbiotic relationship with the bacterium Sinorhizobium meliloti, which is capable of nitrogen fixation.

== Gallery ==
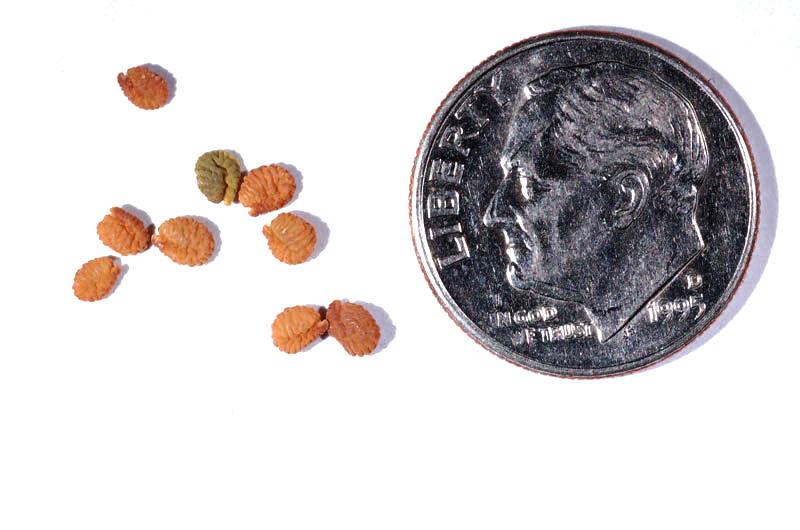
Seeds
