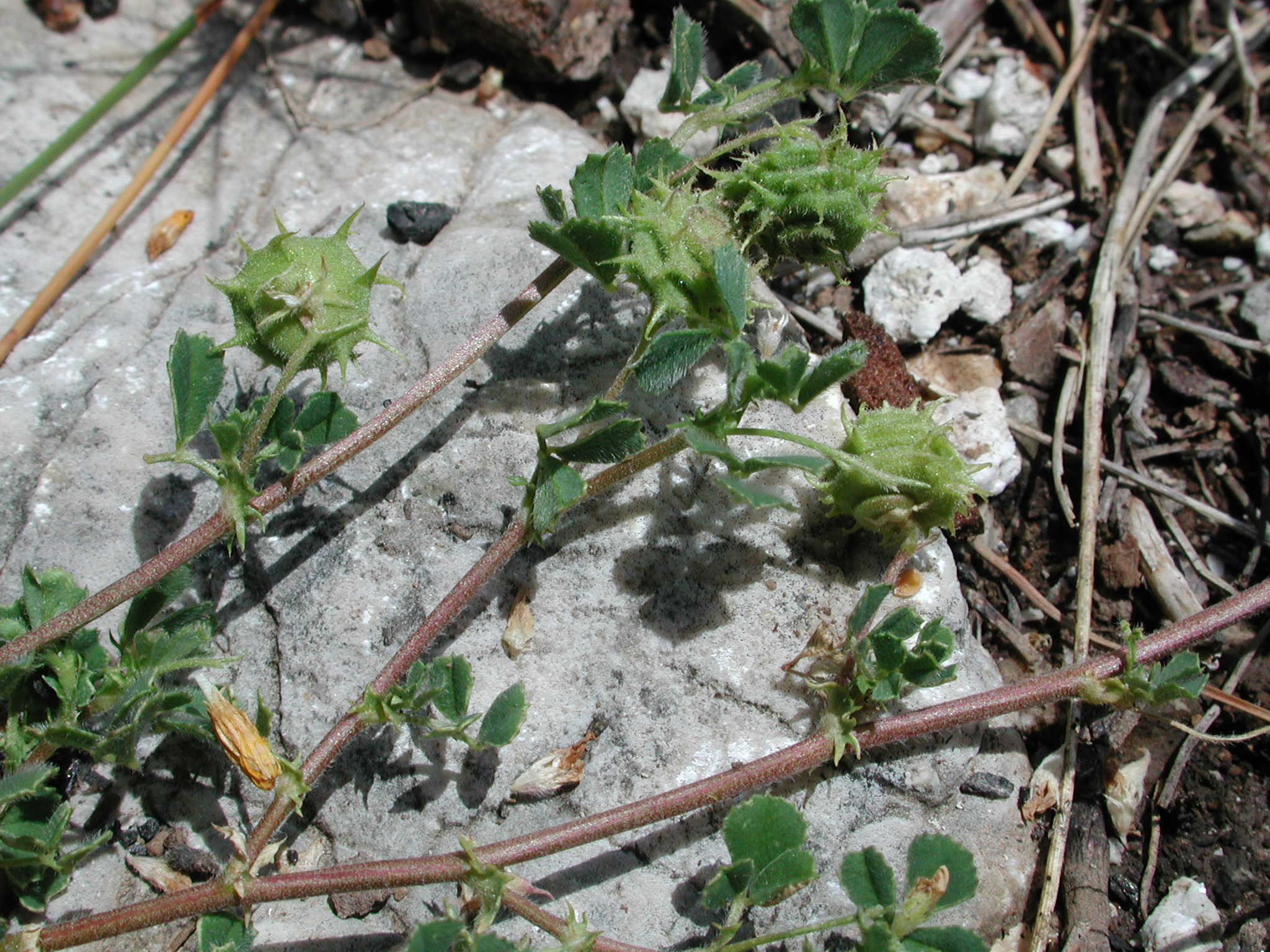

Conservation status
- Least Concern (IUCN 3.1)

Scientific classification
- Kingdom: Plantae
- Clade: Embryophytes
- Clade: Tracheophytes
- Clade: Spermatophytes
- Clade: Angiosperms
- Clade: Eudicots
- Clade: Rosids
- Order: Fabales
- Family: Fabaceae
- Subfamily: Faboideae
- Genus: Medicago
- Species: M. rigidula

Binomial name
- Medicago rigidula (L.) All.

= Medicago rigidula =

Species of plant

Medicago rigidula, the Tifton burclover, is a species of annual herb in the family Fabaceae.

== Description ==
Medicago rigidula is an annual plant with a self-supporting growth form that can grow to 0.5 metres (1 1/2 ft) tall. It has compound, broad leaves.

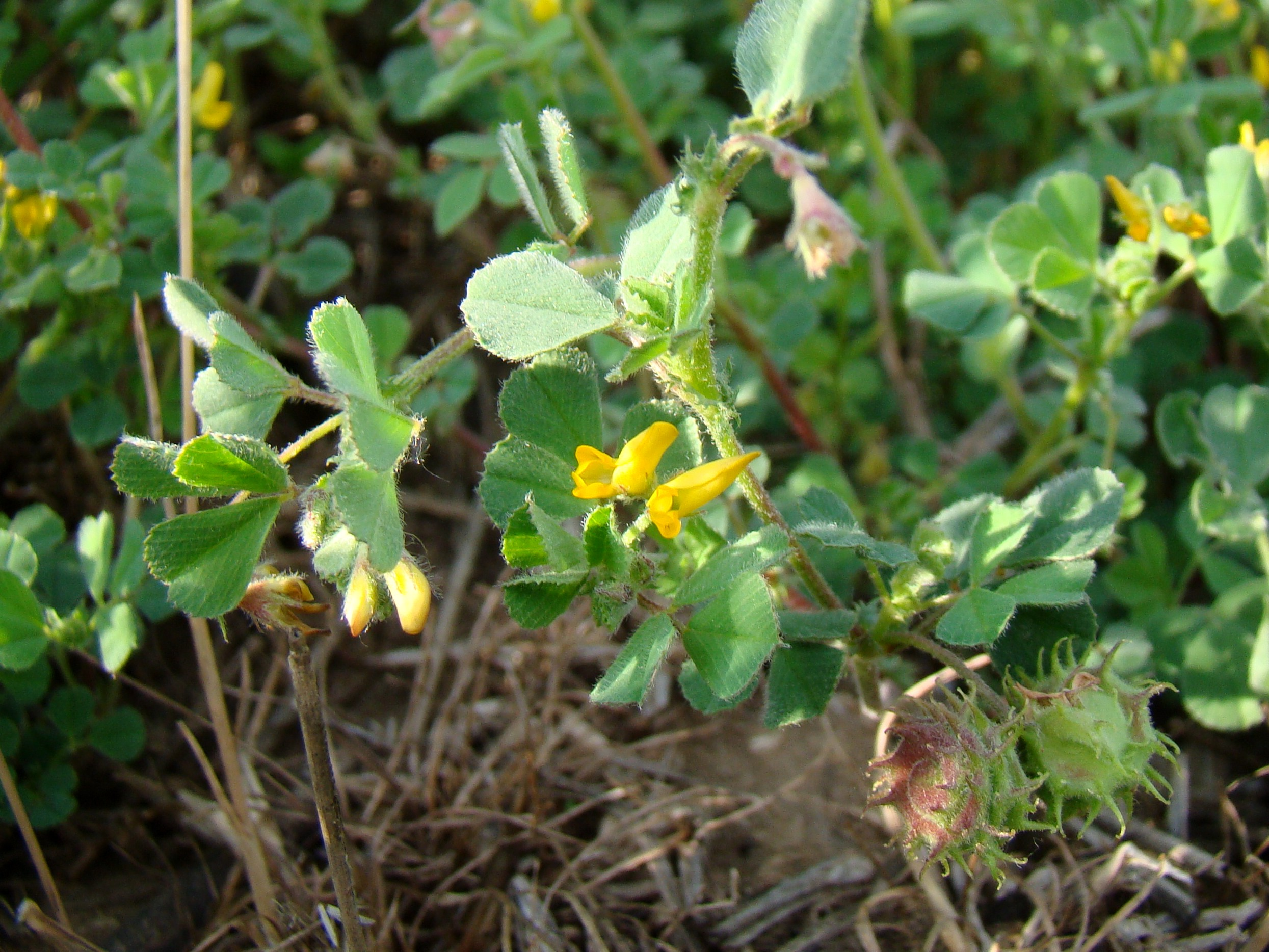
Flower and foliage

Blooming in March and April, the flower is yellow and bilaterally symmetrical. The flowers can consist of four petals, tepals, and sepals, or five petals, tepals, and sepals. The petals are often between 2 and 7 millimetres (1/16 and 1/4 in) in length. Within the flower, there is a superior ovary and a hypanthium. The hypanthium provides a cup-like enlargement of the flower and surrounds the fruits.

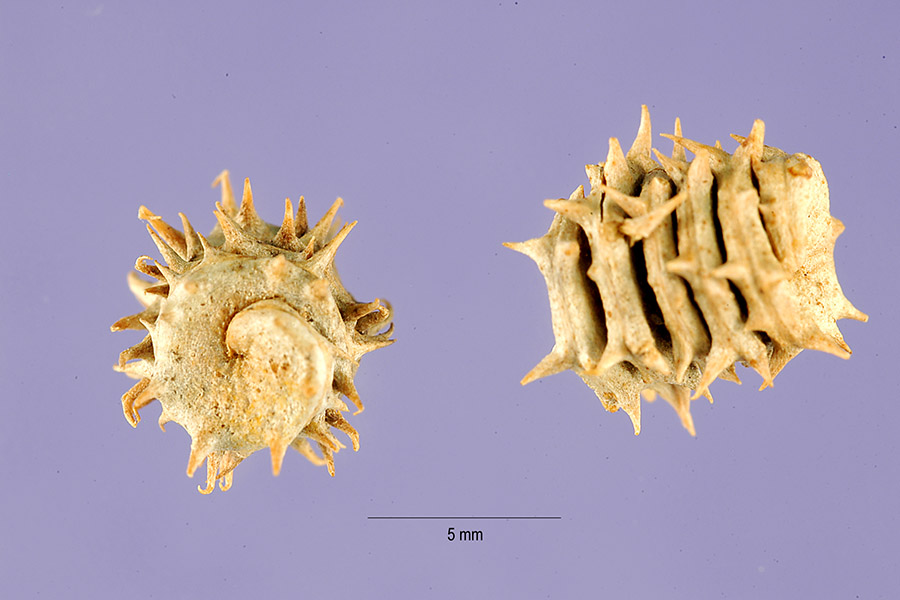
Fruit close-up

The fruit is a spiral coiled legume with a single carpel that dries but does not split open when ripe. The fruits have hairs on them and are protected with thornlike defense structures. The hairs on the fruits aid in seed dispersal by adhering to the fur and feathers of various animals.

== Taxonomy ==
It is a wild relative of cultivated M. truncatula (barrel clover) and M. sativa (alfalfa).

== Distribution and habitat ==
The species has a widespread range occurring at elevations between sea level and 1,800 m (5,900 ft) above sea level. It is native to Albania, Algeria, Baleares, Bulgaria, Corse, Egypt, France, Greece, Italy, Kriti, Krym, Lebanon-Syria, Libya, Morocco, Palestine, Portugal, Romania, Sardegna, Sicilia, South European Russi, Spain, Tunisia, Turkey, Turkmenistan, Ukraine, and Yugoslavia.

It has been introduced to Czechoslovakia, Great Britain, Hungary, and the US state of California.

The species is found in terrestrial ecosystems, in habitats such as temperate forests and grasslands, Mediterranean-type shrublands, and rocky areas (e.g., inland cliffs and mountain peaks). It can also be artificially found in pastures since it is sometimes cultivated as forage crops.

== Ecology ==
Thyme, a dominant aromatic shrub, affects the competitive status of M. rigidula. When M. rigidula is grown alone without a competitor, it tends to survive better in soil with thyme. M. rigidula grown on soil without thyme has a higher biomass.

In laboratory bioassays and field experiments investigating the allelopathic and autotoxic effects of burclover residue on burclover and winter wheat seedlings, the results showed that soils treated with burclover leachates resulted in increased PO_{4}–P, NH_{4}–N, electrical conductivity, total phenolic content, and decreased soil pH. The bioassay results also found that the full-strength leachate of burclover exhibited allelopathy effects on wheat, while growth inhibition of burclover seedlings in the field showed that burclover may have autotoxicity that could reduce productivity.

== Conservation ==
M. rigidula is currently on the IUCN Red List as LC or least concern. It has a stable current population trend, and there are neither any extreme population fluctuations nor any extreme subpopulation fluctuations. The population is not severely fragmented and the mature individuals are not on a continuous decline. It is abundant in Turkey and has a stable global population trend but is a protected species in Hungary.

== Uses ==
Saponins produced by Medicago species are being studied by pharmaceutical companies due to their effectiveness against fungal growth and tumorigenesis. They have also been found to be toxic to bacteria and certain viruses. M. rigidula plants were found to have higher concentrations of saponins when compared to other Medicago species.

Data has shown that M. rigidula can regenerate naturally and form productive pastures in rotation with wheat. Since it is able to tolerate the cold, it is a suitable annual legume that is adapted to the soils and climate of north Syria and the ley-farming system. The successful development of M. rigidula cultivars could aid livestock production in west Asia and north Africa.
