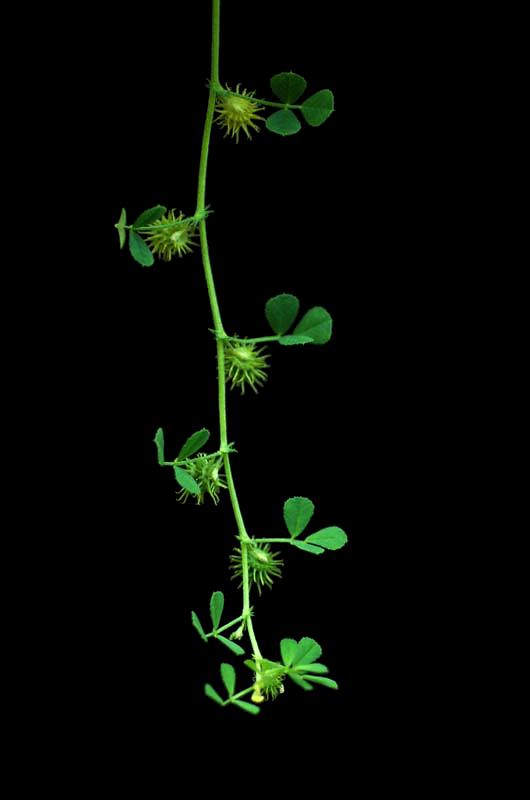

Scientific classification
- Kingdom: Plantae
- Clade: Tracheophytes
- Clade: Angiosperms
- Clade: Eudicots
- Clade: Rosids
- Order: Fabales
- Family: Fabaceae
- Subfamily: Faboideae
- Genus: Medicago
- Species: M. praecox

Binomial name
- Medicago praecox DC.

Synonyms
- Medicago pontificalis Gennari

= Medicago praecox =

Species of legume

Medicago praecox, the Mediterranean medick or early medick, is a plant species of the genus Medicago. It is found throughout the northern Mediterranean. It forms a symbiotic relationship with the bacterium Sinorhizobium meliloti, which is capable of nitrogen fixation.
