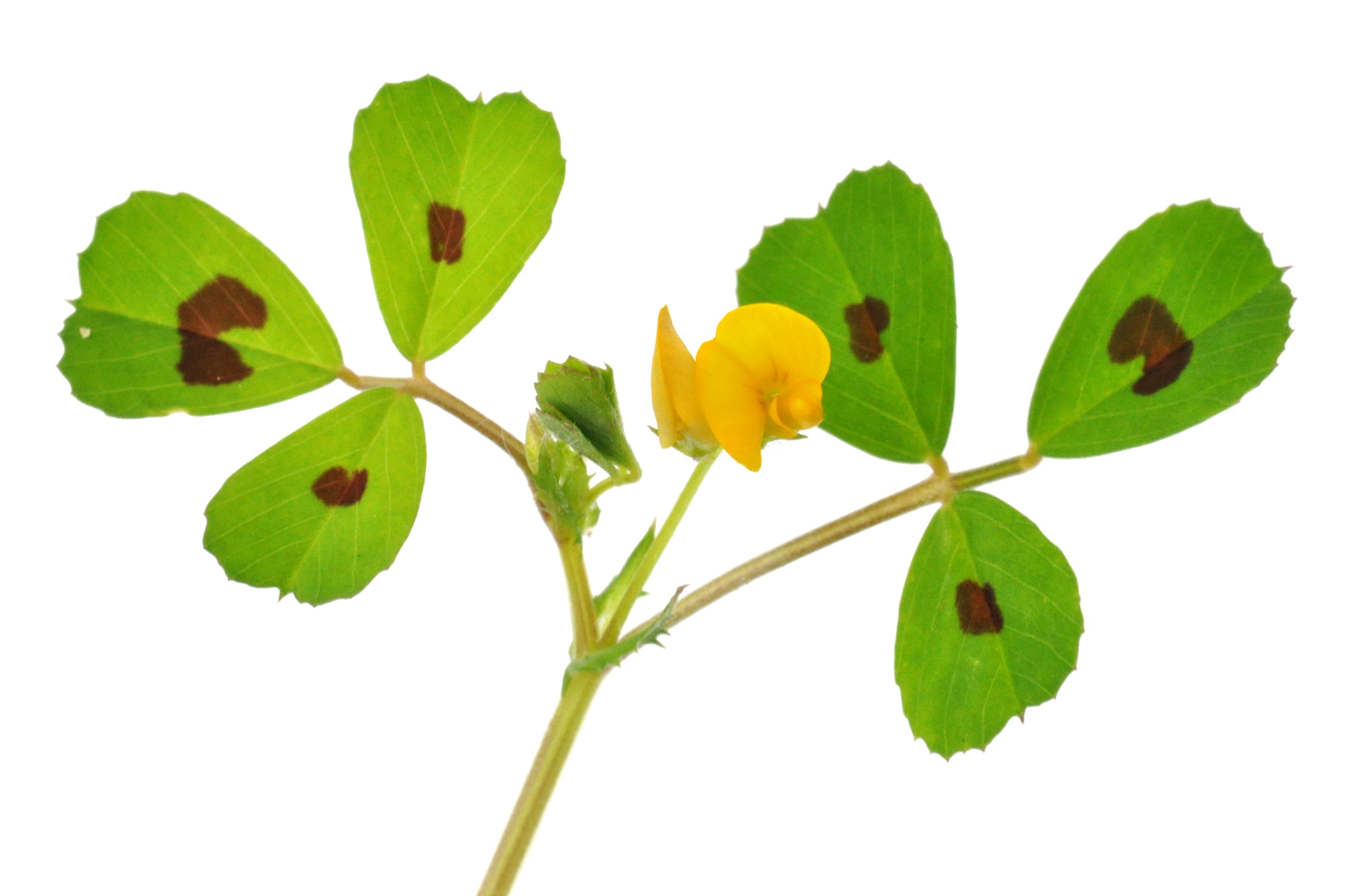

Scientific classification
- Kingdom: Plantae
- Clade: Tracheophytes
- Clade: Angiosperms
- Clade: Eudicots
- Clade: Rosids
- Order: Fabales
- Family: Fabaceae
- Subfamily: Faboideae
- Genus: Medicago
- Species: M. arabica

Binomial name
- Medicago arabica (L.) Huds.

Varieties
- M. a. var. heptacycla Urb. M. a. var. immaculata Schur; M. a. var. intermis Ricker; M. a. var. minor Loj. and Poj. M. a. var. vulgaris Rouy

Synonyms
- Medica arabica Med. Medicago cordata Desr. Medicago coronata Pall. Medicago immaculata Schur; Medicago maculata Sibth. Medicago maculata Willd. Medicago maculata var. immaculata Schur; Medicago oxaloides Schur; Medicago polymorpha var. arabica L. Medicago tinei Loj. & Poj.

= Medicago arabica =

Species of legume

Medicago arabica, the spotted medick, spotted burclover, heart clover, is a flowering plant in the pea and bean family Fabaceae.

== Description ==
It is a sprawling plant with a height of 20–60 centimetres (8–24 in). It usually has spotted trifoliate leaves, but the number of leaflets per leaf can sometimes be different. The flowers are pale yellow and appear spring and summer. The fruits are legumes, strangely coiled and sharply spiny.

== Distribution and habitat ==
It is native to the Mediterranean basin but is found throughout the world, usually on clifftop grasslands and grassy places. It forms a symbiotic relationship with the bacterium Sinorhizobium medicae, which is capable of nitrogen fixation.

== Uses ==
Due to its nitrogen fixation, it is sometimes considered a useful cover crop to restore soil nutrients by farmers in its native range, though it is also weedy and can thus be a nuisance. It is edible both for livestock and humans, and attracts pollinators. It also has been used in traditional medicine for possible diuretic, expectorant, and anti-inflammatory properties.
