= Medicago constricta =

Conservation status
- Least Concern (IUCN 3.1)

Scientific classification
- Kingdom: Plantae
- Clade: Tracheophytes
- Clade: Angiosperms
- Clade: Eudicots
- Clade: Rosids
- Order: Fabales
- Family: Fabaceae
- Subfamily: Faboideae
- Genus: Medicago
- Species: M. constricta

Binomial name
- Medicago constricta Durieu

Synonyms
- Medicago rigidula subsp. constricta (Durieu) Ponert

Species of legume

Medicago constricta is species of flowering plant in the family Fabaceae. It is an annual, non-climbing plant found in the Mediterranean basin from Greece to Israel. M. constricta is found primarily in sandy clay or dry soils. It forms a symbiotic relationship with the bacterium Sinorhizobium meliloti, which is capable of nitrogen fixation.

== Gallery ==
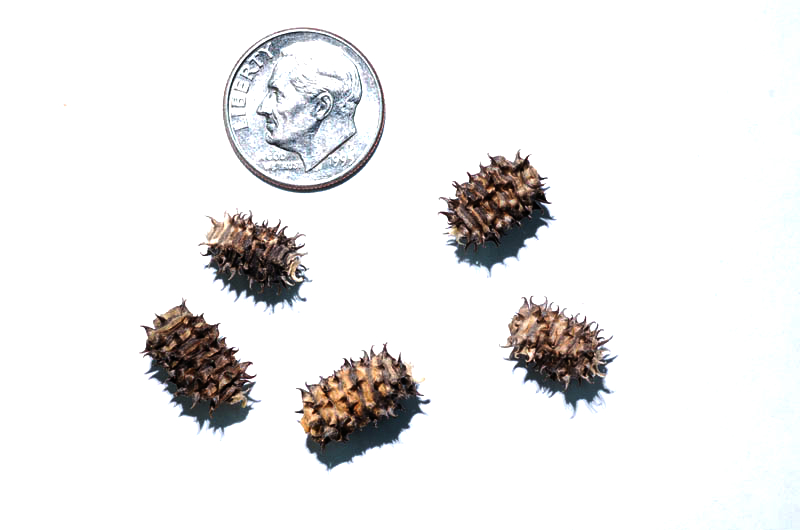
seed pods

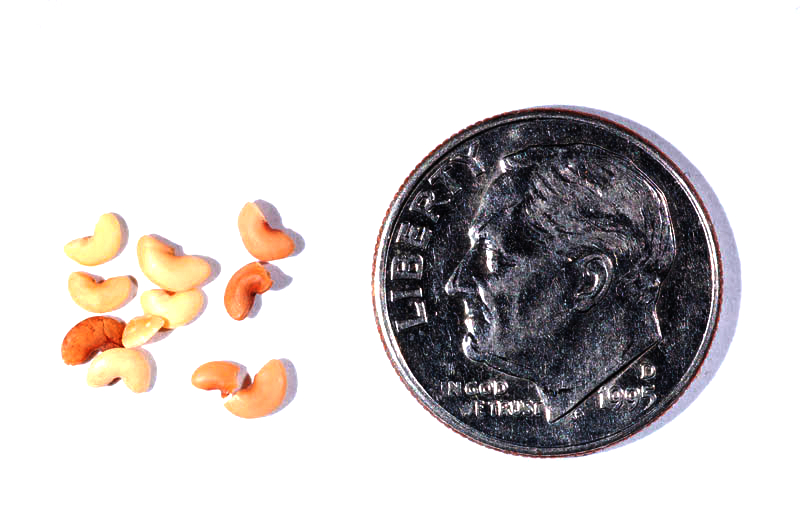
seeds
