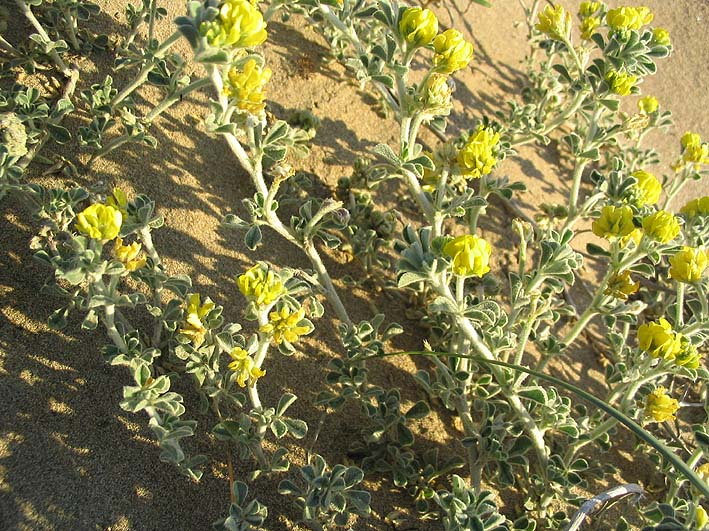

Scientific classification
- Kingdom: Plantae
- Clade: Tracheophytes
- Clade: Angiosperms
- Clade: Eudicots
- Clade: Rosids
- Order: Fabales
- Family: Fabaceae
- Subfamily: Faboideae
- Genus: Medicago
- Section: M. sect. Medicago
- Species: M. marina

Binomial name
- Medicago marina L.

= Medicago marina =

Species of legume

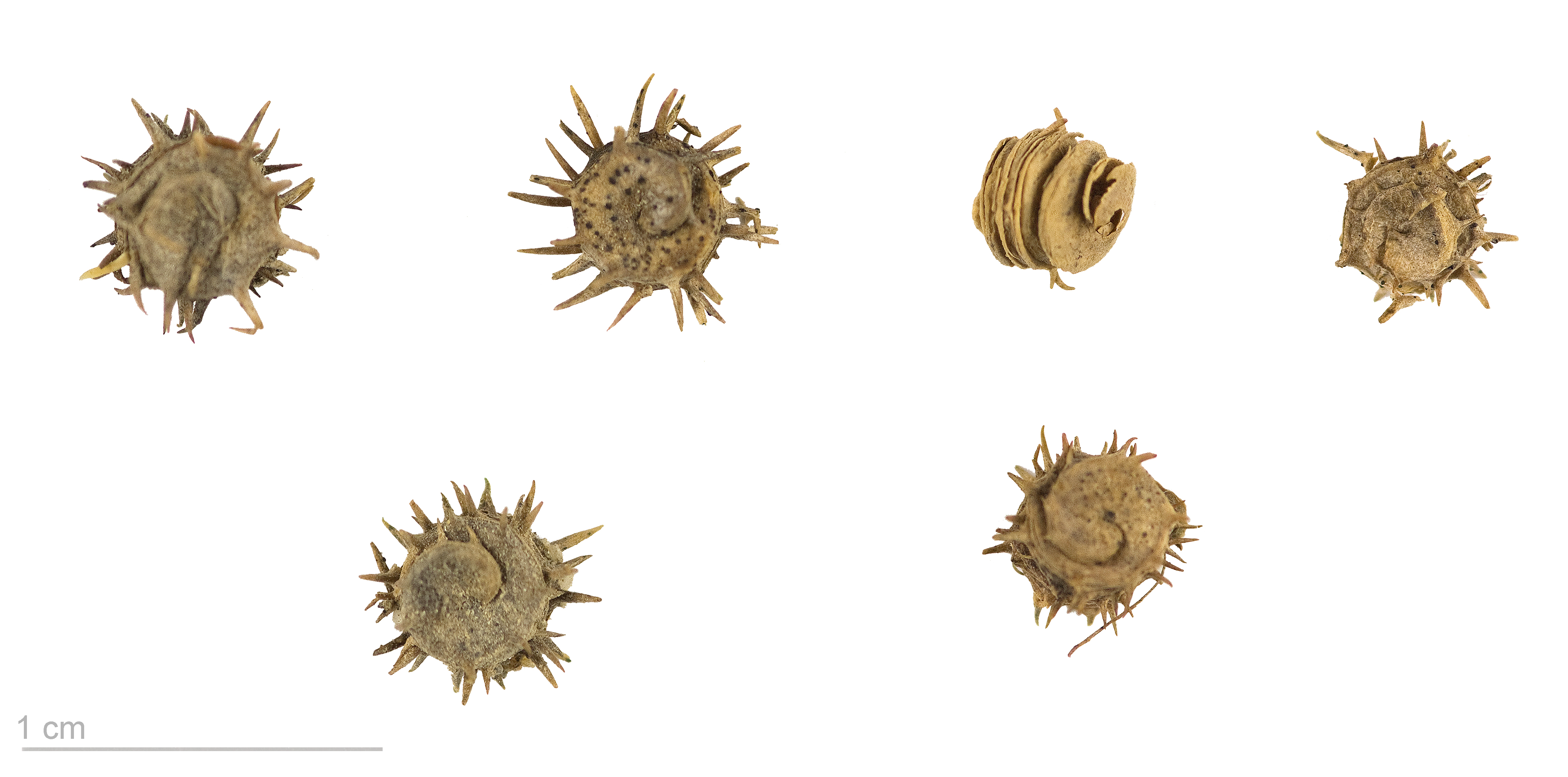
Medicago marina - MHNT

Medicago marina is a plant species of the genus Medicago. It is native to the Mediterranean basin but is found worldwide. It forms a symbiotic relationship with the bacterium Sinorhizobium meliloti, which is capable of nitrogen fixation. Common names include coastal medick and sea medick.
