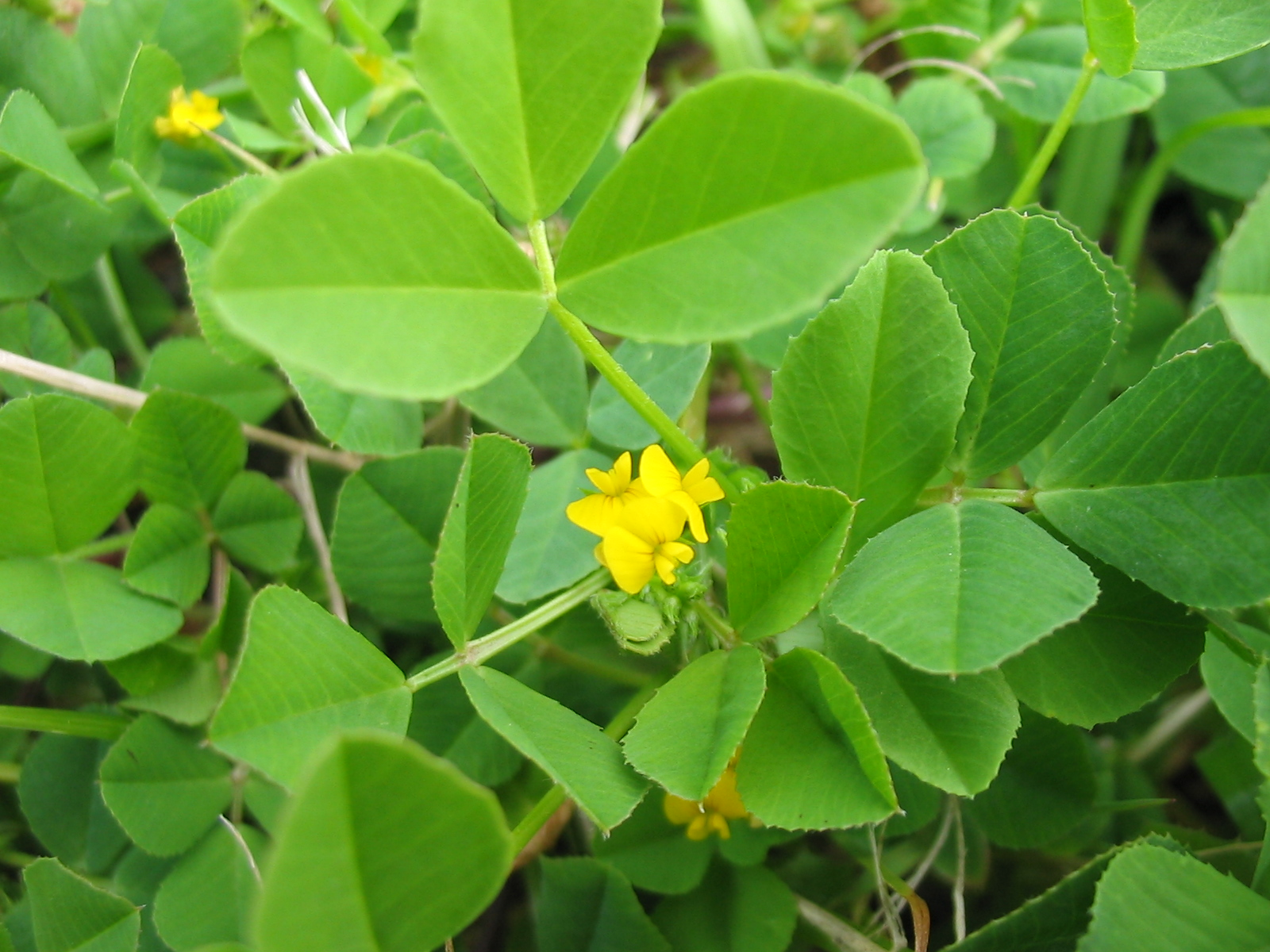

Scientific classification
- Kingdom: Plantae
- Clade: Tracheophytes
- Clade: Angiosperms
- Clade: Eudicots
- Clade: Rosids
- Order: Fabales
- Family: Fabaceae
- Subfamily: Faboideae
- Genus: Medicago
- Species: M. polymorpha

Binomial name
- Medicago polymorpha L.

Synonyms
- M. apiculata Willd. M. denticulata Willd. M. hispida Gaertn. M. lappacea Desr. M. loretii Albert; M. nigra (L.) Krocker; M. pentacycla DC. M. polycarpa Godron & Gren. M. polymorpha subsp. hispida (Gaertner) Ponert; M. polymorpha subsp. lappacea (Desr.) Bonafe; M. polymorpha subsp. polycarpa Romero Zarco; M. reticulata Benth. M. terebellum Willd.

= Medicago polymorpha =

Species of legume

Medicago polymorpha is a plant species of the genus Medicago. Common names include California burclover, toothed bur clover, toothed medick and burr medic.

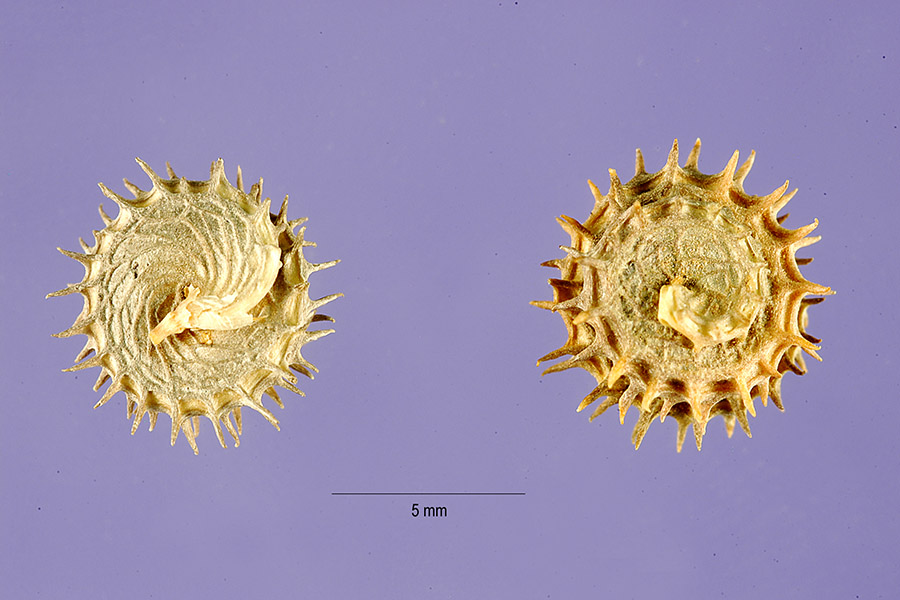
fruit

== Description ==
This weedy forb is an annual broadleaf plant. It inhabits agricultural land, roadsides and other disturbed areas. It is found in lawns as well, where its burrs are able to cling to the clothing or fur of any species that pass near it, thus facilitating geographic spread via these seed capsules. It makes a poor lawn in the late summer, when the leaves have yellowed and fruit sets into the 7 mm seed heads that are covered with hooked prickles.

New seedlings have seed leaves that are oblong. The first true leaf is rounded. Later leaves will be tripartite, with a characteristic clover-like shape, appearing alternately on the stems. Leaflets have slightly serrated edges. The tiny yellow flowers attract small butterflies and other pollinating insects.

Full grown plant stems are up to 60 centimetres (24 in) long, and usually sprawl along and/or under the ground. The stems often root at the nodes; adult plants, and even young plants that have been able to grow for a few weeks undisturbed can be very difficult to pull out, leaving behind tap roots and a network of plant pieces when pulled. Mechanically removing top growth from this plant will not usually eradicate it. If not properly managed, burclover may then become invasive and displace more desirable vegetation.

Being a member of the family Fabaceae, the flowers are clover-like, lipped and clustered. Bloom takes place from March to June in the plant's native territory. The flowers (3–6 mm long) are small, bright yellow, and cluster into flower heads of 2 to 10 flowers at the stem tips. The fruit is a pod that coils tightly 2 to 6 times and has rows of prickles on the outside edge of the pod. The fruits are about 6–7 mm across. They start out green and relatively soft, but quickly turn brown and hard. Inside the pod are several seeds—usually yellow or tan and kidney-shaped. The burred fruiting bodies can be quite difficult to remove from softer fabrics, such as fleeces and knitted socks.

== Distribution and ecology ==
It is native to the Mediterranean basin but is found throughout the world.

The species forms a symbiotic relationship with the bacterium Sinorhizobium medicae, which is capable of nitrogen fixation.

Burclover is a good forage for livestock, but the fruit is prickly. All classes of livestock, except horses and mules, can feed on its leaves.

== Culinary uses ==
The plant is edible and consumed as a vegetable in China, primarily in Jiangsu, Zhejiang and Shanghai. Its Chinese culinary names include 草頭 (Wu tsho-doe, Mandarin Pinyin cǎo tóu), 金花菜 (Wu cin-hau tse, Mandarin Pinyin jīn huā cài), 三叶菜 (sān yè cài) and 秧草 (yāng cǎo), while 南苜蓿 (nán mùxu) is its scientific name. It is also consumed in indigenous Otomanguean communities in Southern Mexico. In the Triqui language it is known as kkweej chakáj, meaning 'edible green (of the) pig.'

== See also ==
- List of vegetables
- Medicago lupulina, black medic, a similar plant
