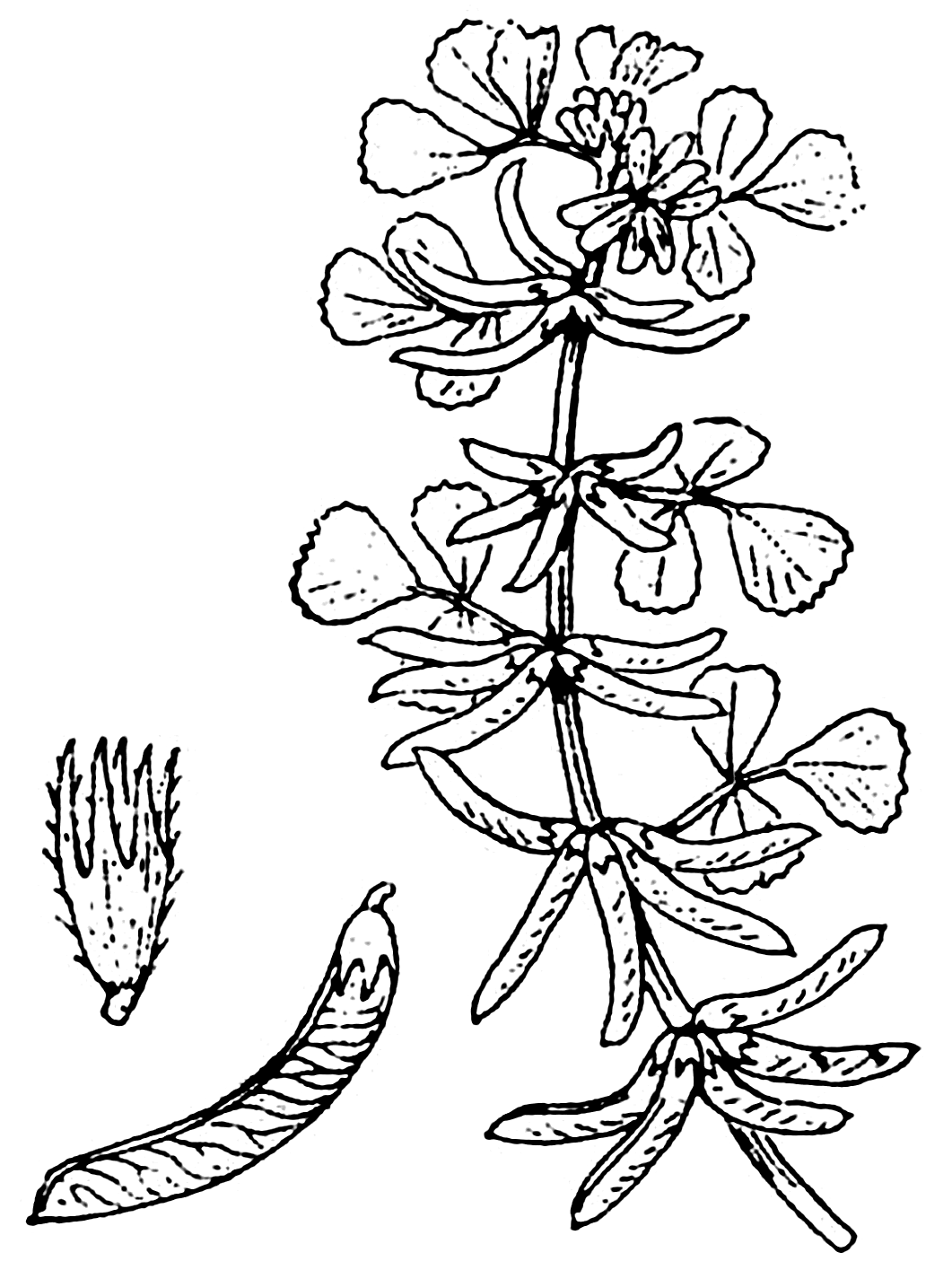

Scientific classification
- Kingdom: Plantae
- Clade: Tracheophytes
- Clade: Angiosperms
- Clade: Eudicots
- Clade: Rosids
- Order: Fabales
- Family: Fabaceae
- Subfamily: Faboideae
- Genus: Medicago
- Species: M. monspeliaca

Binomial name
- Medicago monspeliaca (L.) Trautv.

Synonyms
- Trigonella monspeliaca

= Medicago monspeliaca =

Species of plant

Medicago monspeliaca, the hairy medick, is a species of annual herb in the family Fabaceae. They have a self-supporting growth form and compound, broad leaves. Individuals can grow to 0.12 m.

== Sources ==
This article incorporates text from a free content work. Licensed under CC0 (license statement/permission). Text taken from Medicago monspeliaca. Encyclopedia of Life.
