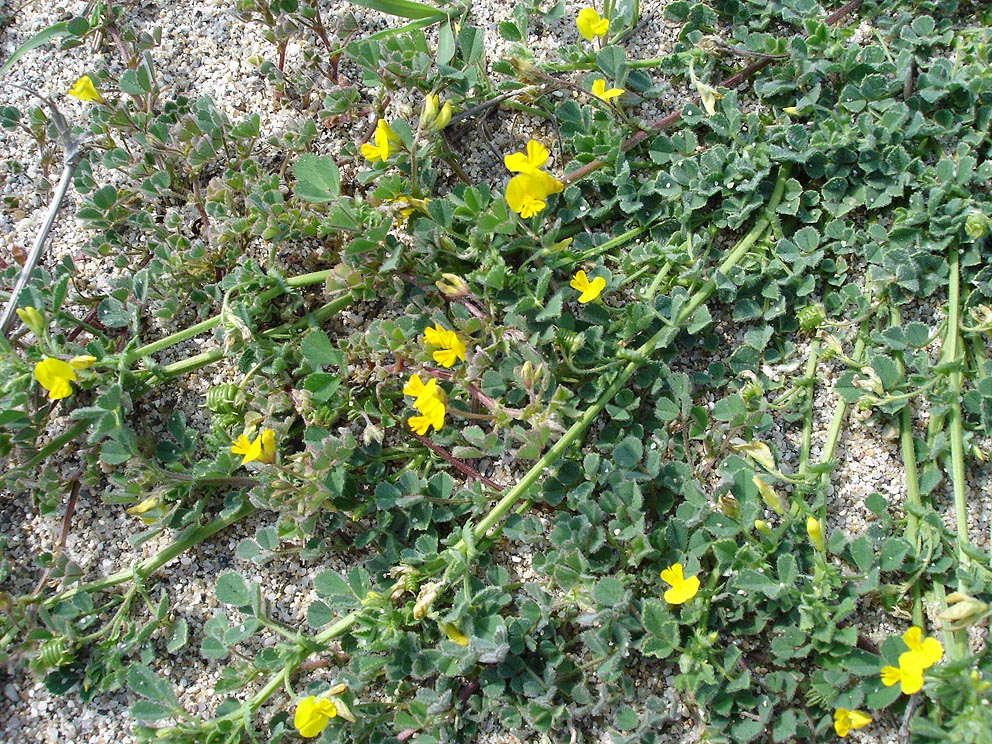

Scientific classification
- Kingdom: Plantae
- Clade: Embryophytes
- Clade: Tracheophytes
- Clade: Spermatophytes
- Clade: Angiosperms
- Clade: Eudicots
- Clade: Rosids
- Order: Fabales
- Family: Fabaceae
- Subfamily: Faboideae
- Genus: Medicago
- Species: M. littoralis

Binomial name
- Medicago littoralis Lois

Synonyms
- Medicago arenaria Ten.; Medicago cylindracea DC.; Medicago littoralis subsp. cylindracea (DC.) Nyman; Medicago littoralis subsp. tricycla (DC.) J. M. Lainz; Medicago striata sensu auct.ital.; Medicago subinermis Bertol.; Medicago tricycla DC.; Medicago truncatula subsp. littoralis (Lois.) Ponert

= Medicago littoralis =

Species of flowering plant

Medicago littoralis is an annual plant species of the genus Medicago. Its native range encompasses the Mediterranean Basin, from Macaronesia to the Caucasus; it has been introduced elsewhere. It is useful as a forage for livestock. As a leguminous plant, it is capable of adding nitrogen to soils, through its symbiotic relationship with the bacterium Sinorhizobium meliloti, which enables nitrogen fixation. Common names include shore medick, water medick, coastal medick, and strand medick.

== Description ==
Medicago littoralis is a prostrate or procumbent herb, occasionally with an ascending habit.

== Distribution and habitat ==
The species has been introduced to Belgium, the US states of Florida and New Jersey, Great Britain, the Netherlands, and to parts of Australia. It is naturalised in South Australia and considered "alien" but non-invasive in Western Australia.

== Agricultural uses ==
'Seraph', is a specially bred variety of M. littoralis, selected for its resistance to powdery mildew and tolerance of sulfonylurea herbicide residues.

== Gallery ==
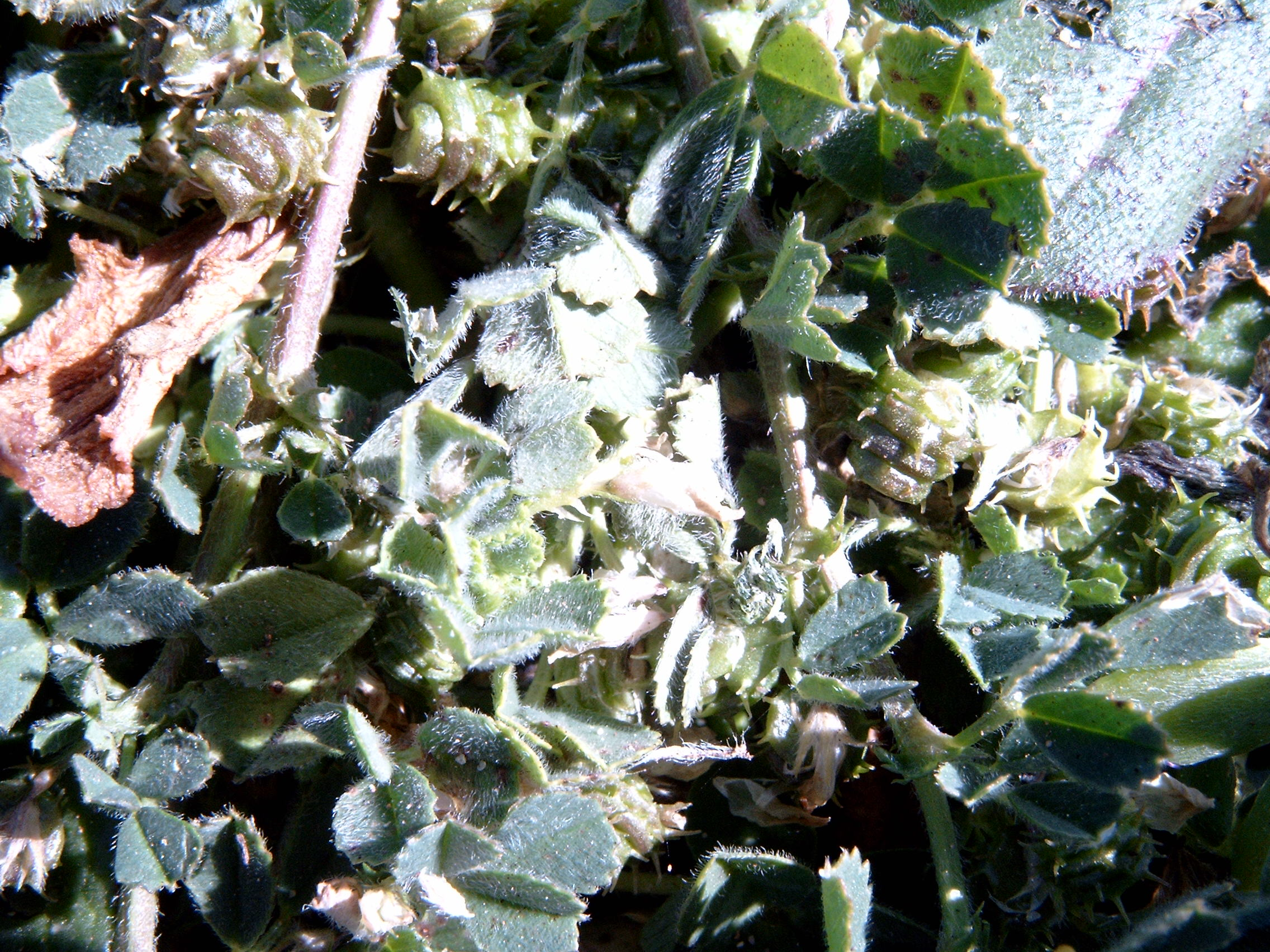

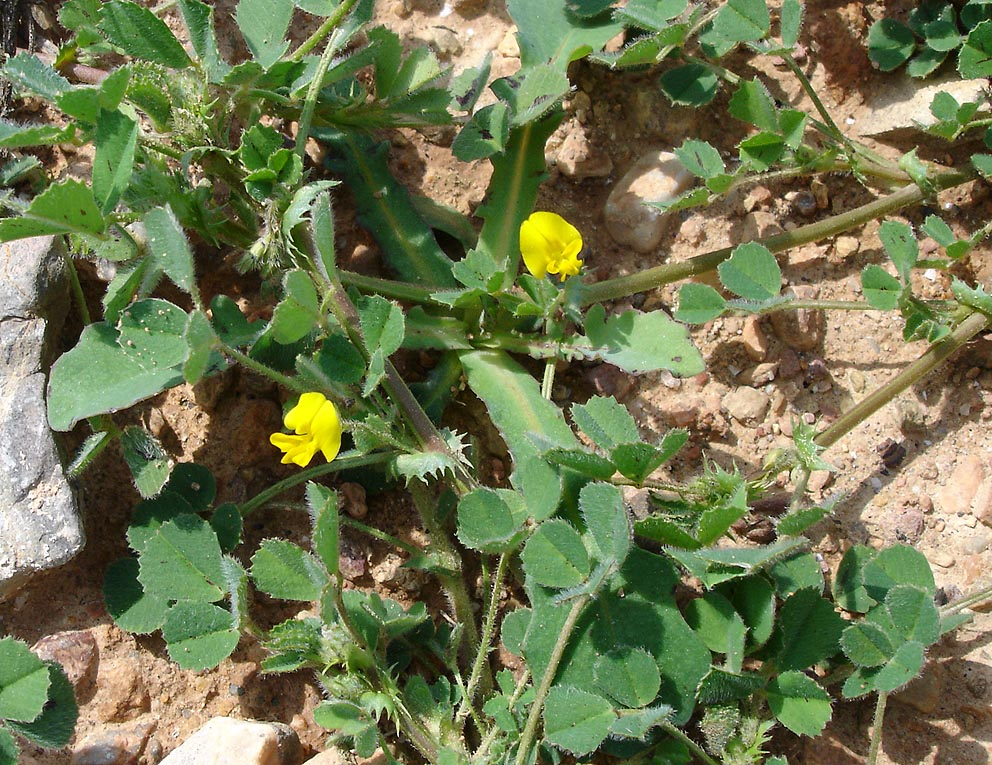

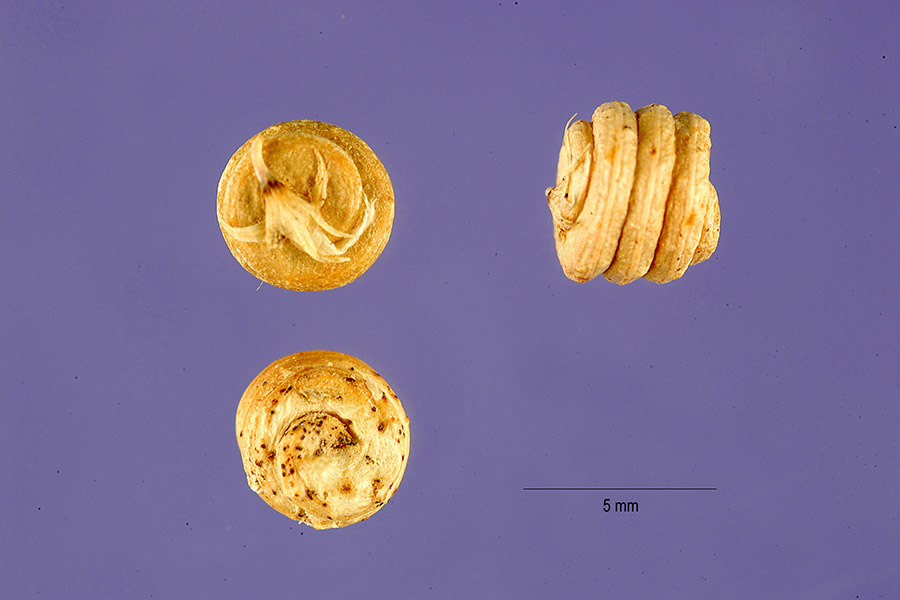
Seed pods
