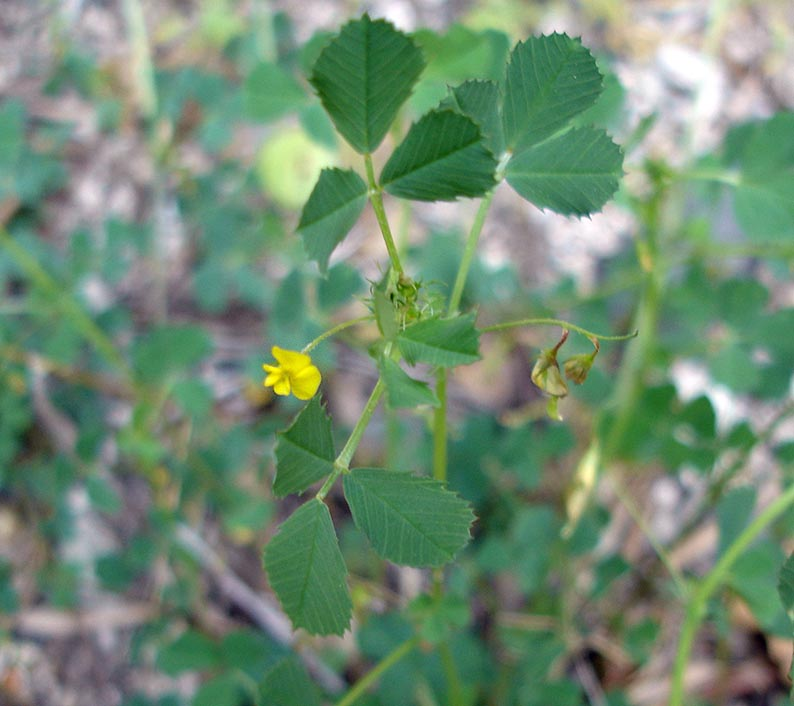

Scientific classification
- Kingdom: Plantae
- Clade: Tracheophytes
- Clade: Angiosperms
- Clade: Eudicots
- Clade: Rosids
- Order: Fabales
- Family: Fabaceae
- Subfamily: Faboideae
- Genus: Medicago
- Species: M. orbicularis

Binomial name
- Medicago orbicularis (L.) Bartal.

Synonyms
- Medicago applanata Hornem.; Medicago biancae (Urban) Pinto da Silva; Medicago cuneata J. Woods; Medicago marginata Willd.; Medicago orbicularis (L.) All.; Medicago polymorpha var. orbicularis L.

= Medicago orbicularis =

Species of legume

Medicago orbicularis is a plant species found throughout the Mediterranean basin and along the European Black Sea coast. It forms a symbiotic relationship with the bacterium Sinorhizobium medicae, which is capable of nitrogen fixation. Common names include blackdisk medick, button clover, button medick, and round-fruited medick.

== Uses ==
The seed pods are edible and are foraged between March and May in Israel (Palestine).

== Gallery ==
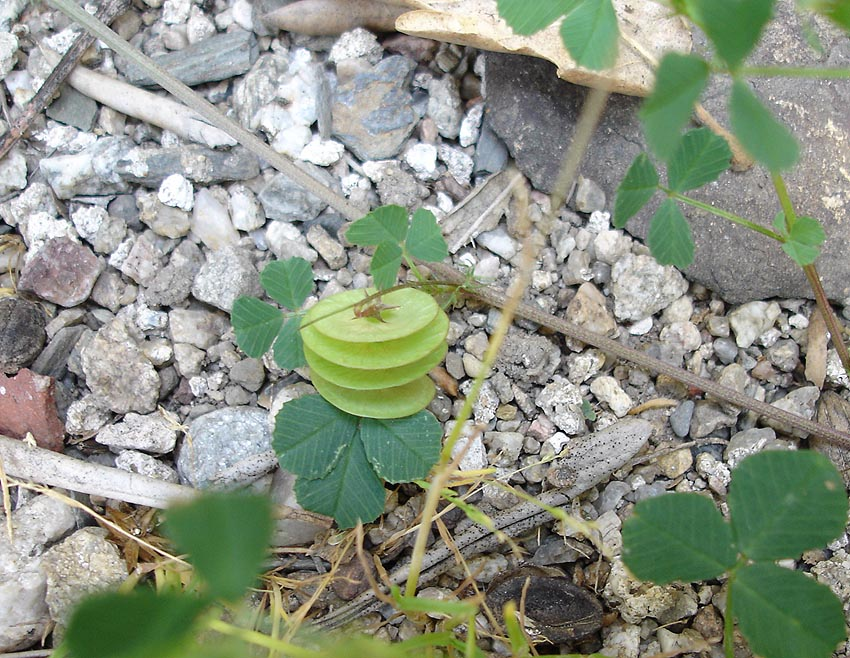
Seed pods

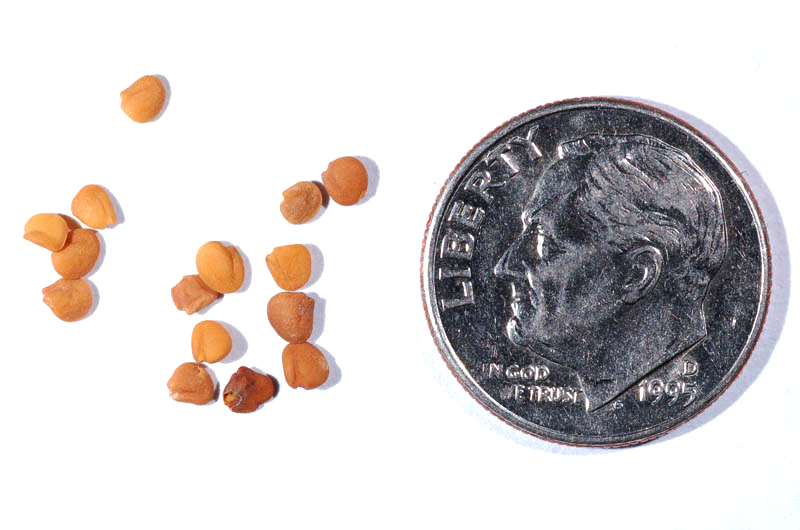
Seeds

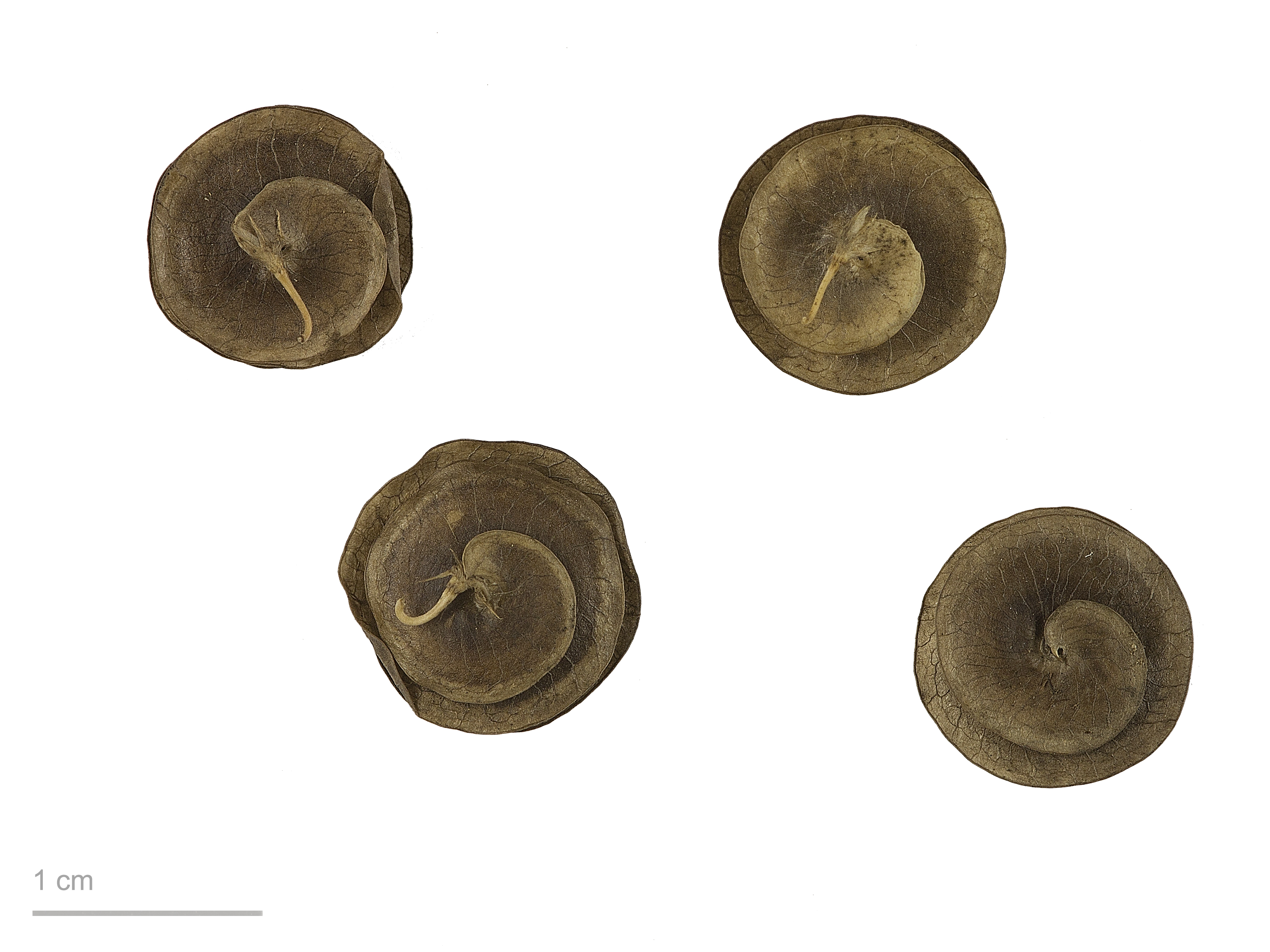
Medicago orbicularis - MHNT
