= Medicago intertexta =

Scientific classification
- Kingdom: Plantae
- Clade: Tracheophytes
- Clade: Angiosperms
- Clade: Eudicots
- Clade: Rosids
- Order: Fabales
- Family: Fabaceae
- Subfamily: Faboideae
- Genus: Medicago
- Species: M. intertexta

Binomial name
- Medicago intertexta (L.) Mill.

Species of legume

Medicago intertexta, the hedgehog medick, Calvary clover, or Calvary medick, is a flowering plant of the family Fabaceae. It is found primarily in the western Mediterranean basin. It forms a symbiotic relationship with the bacterium Sinorhizobium medicae, which is capable of nitrogen fixation.

A form with red-blotched leaves was formerly much grown as a garden plant.

== Gallery ==
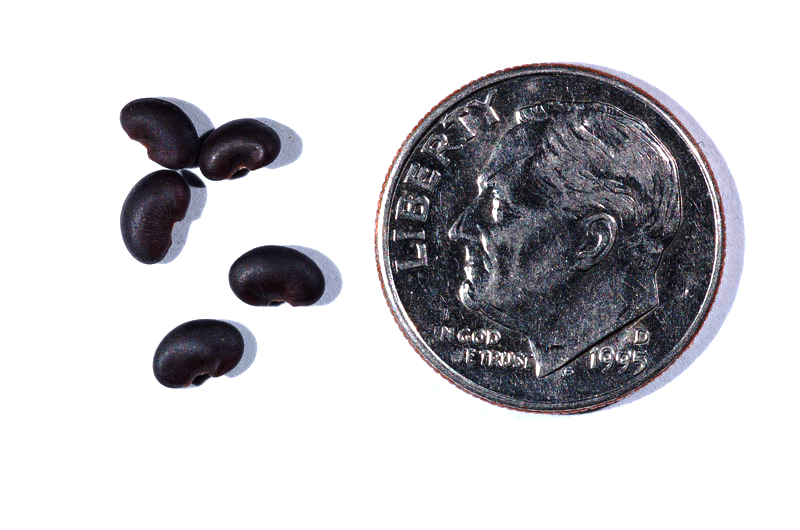
Seeds, with U.S. Quarter for size reference
