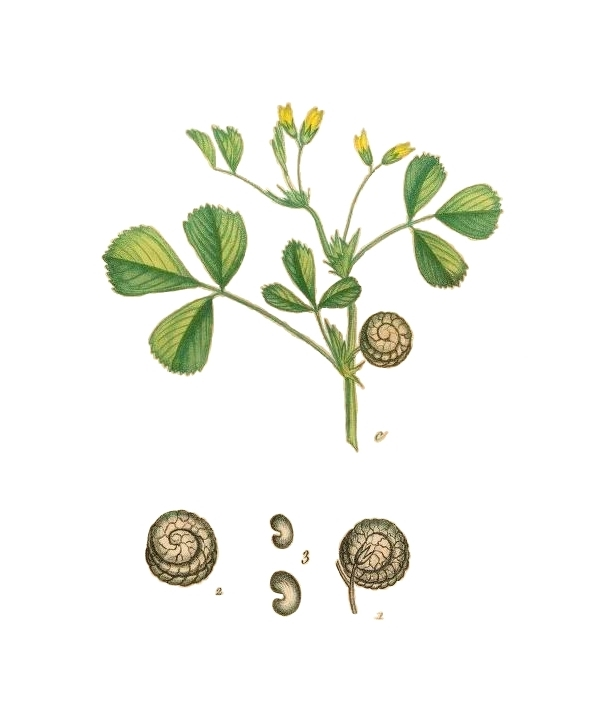

Scientific classification
- Kingdom: Plantae
- Clade: Tracheophytes
- Clade: Angiosperms
- Clade: Eudicots
- Clade: Rosids
- Order: Fabales
- Family: Fabaceae
- Subfamily: Faboideae
- Genus: Medicago
- Species: M. rugosa

Binomial name
- Medicago rugosa Desr.

Synonyms
- Medicago elegans

= Medicago rugosa =

Species of plant

Medicago rugosa, the wrinkled medick, is a species of annual herb in the family Fabaceae. They have a self-supporting growth form and compound, broad leaves. Individuals can grow to 0.2 m.

== Sources ==
This article incorporates text from a free content work. Licensed under CC0 (license statement/permission). Text taken from Medicago rugosa. Encyclopedia of Life.
