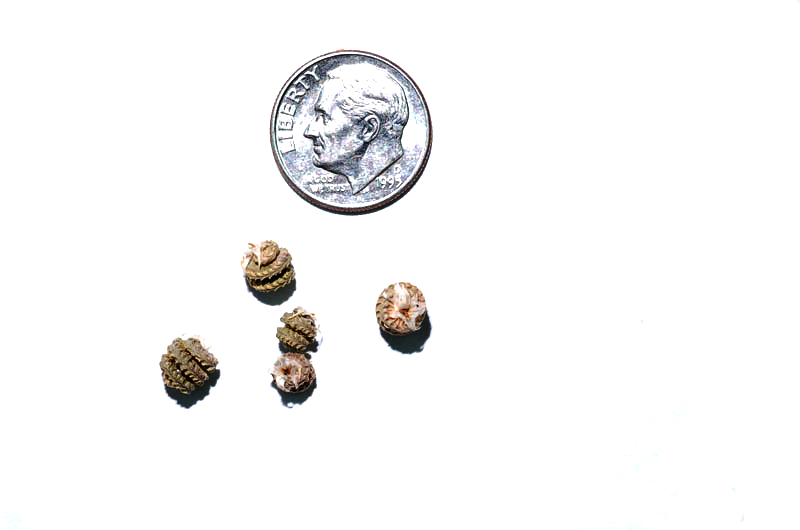
- Seed pods of Medicago noeana next to a U.S. dime for scale.

Scientific classification
- Kingdom: Plantae
- Clade: Tracheophytes
- Clade: Angiosperms
- Clade: Eudicots
- Clade: Rosids
- Order: Fabales
- Family: Fabaceae
- Subfamily: Faboideae
- Genus: Medicago
- Species: M. noeana

Binomial name
- Medicago noeana Boiss.

= Medicago noeana =

Species of flowering plant

Medicago noeana is a species of flowering plant in the Fabaceae family. It can be found throughout the Middle East. It forms a symbiotic relationship with the bacterium Sinorhizobium meliloti, which is capable of nitrogen fixation.
