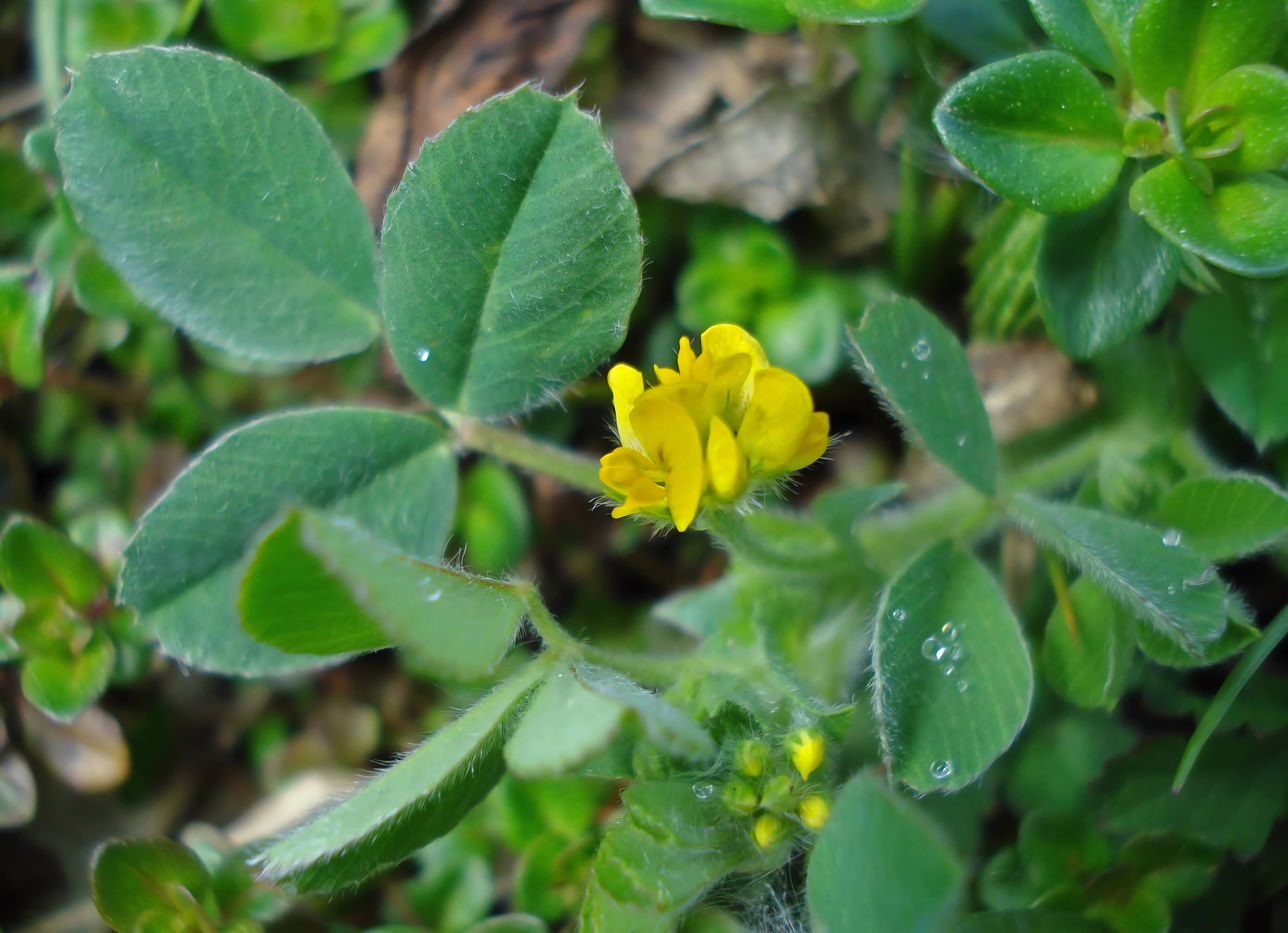

Scientific classification
- Kingdom: Plantae
- Clade: Tracheophytes
- Clade: Angiosperms
- Clade: Eudicots
- Clade: Rosids
- Order: Fabales
- Family: Fabaceae
- Subfamily: Faboideae
- Genus: Medicago
- Species: M. minima

Binomial name
- Medicago minima L.

Synonyms
- Medicago hirsuta (L.) All. Medicago minima (L.) Bartal. Medicago hirsuta subsp. brevispina (Benth.) Ponert; Medicago hirsuta subsp. ononidea Ruoy; Medicago mollissima Roth; Medicago ononidea (Ruoy) A. W. Hill; Medicago polymorpha var. minima L. Medicago pulchella Lowe; Medicago recta (Desf.) Willd.

= Medicago minima =

Species of legume

Medicago minima is a plant species of the genus Medicago. It is native to the Mediterranean basin but is found worldwide. It forms a symbiotic relationship with the bacterium Sinorhizobium meliloti, which is capable of nitrogen fixation. Common names include bur medick, little bur-clover, little bur medick, little medick, small medick, and woolly bur medick.
