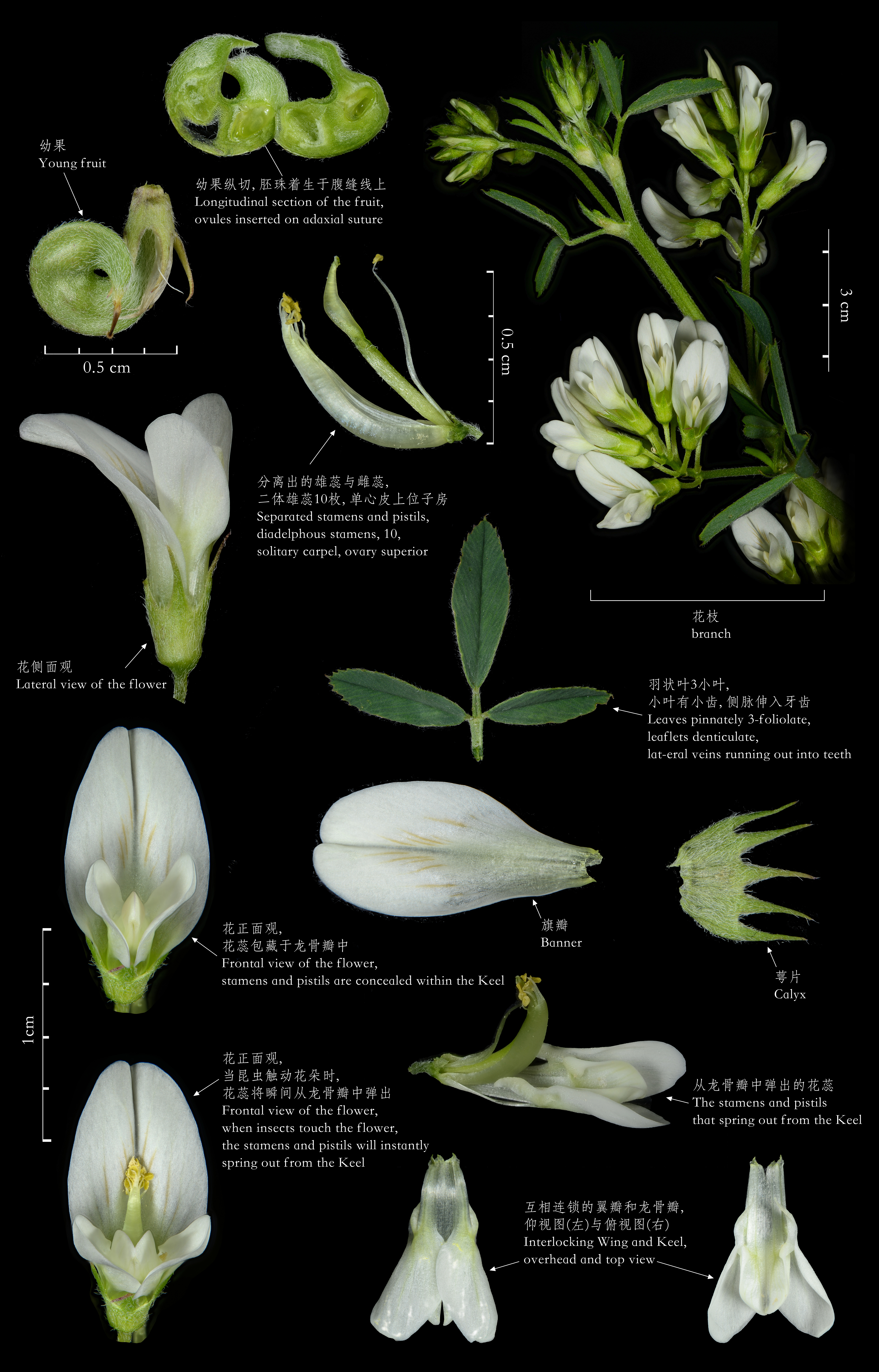
- Anatomical diagram of Medicago flowers

Scientific classification
- Kingdom: Plantae
- Clade: Tracheophytes
- Clade: Angiosperms
- Clade: Eudicots
- Clade: Rosids
- Order: Fabales
- Family: Fabaceae
- Subfamily: Faboideae
- Clade: Inverted repeat-lacking clade
- Tribe: Trifolieae
- Genus: Medicago; L. (1753)

Type species
- Medicago sativa

Species
- 87–105; see text.

Synonyms
- List: Cochleata Medik. (1787); Crimaea Vassilcz. (1979); Diploprion Viv. (1824); Factorovskya Eig (1927); Kamiella Vassilcz. (1979); Lupularia (Serg.) Opiz (1852), nom. superfl.; Lupulina Noulet (1837), nom. superfl.; Medica Mill. (1754); Medicula Medik. (1787); Nephromedia Kostel. (1844); Rhodusia Vassilcz. (1972); Spirocarpus Opiz (1852); Trifillum Medik. (1787); Turukhania Vassilcz. (1979)

= Medicago =

Genus of flowering plants in the bean family

Medicago is a genus of flowering plants, commonly known as medick or burclover, in the legume family (Fabaceae). It contains at least 87 species. The genus name is based on the Latin name for that plant, medica, from Greek: μηδική (πόα) Median (grass).

The genus is distributed mainly around the Mediterranean Basin, also extending across temperate Eurasia and sub-Saharan Africa. Its best-known member is alfalfa (M. sativa), an important forage crop.

== Description ==
Most members of the genus are low, creeping herbs, resembling clover, but with burs (hence the common name). However, alfalfa grows to a height of 1 metre (3 1/2 ft), and tree medick (M. arborea) is a shrub. Members of the genus are known to produce bioactive compounds such as medicarpin (a flavonoid) and medicagenic acid (a triterpenoid saponin). Chromosome numbers in Medicago range from 2n = 14 to 48.

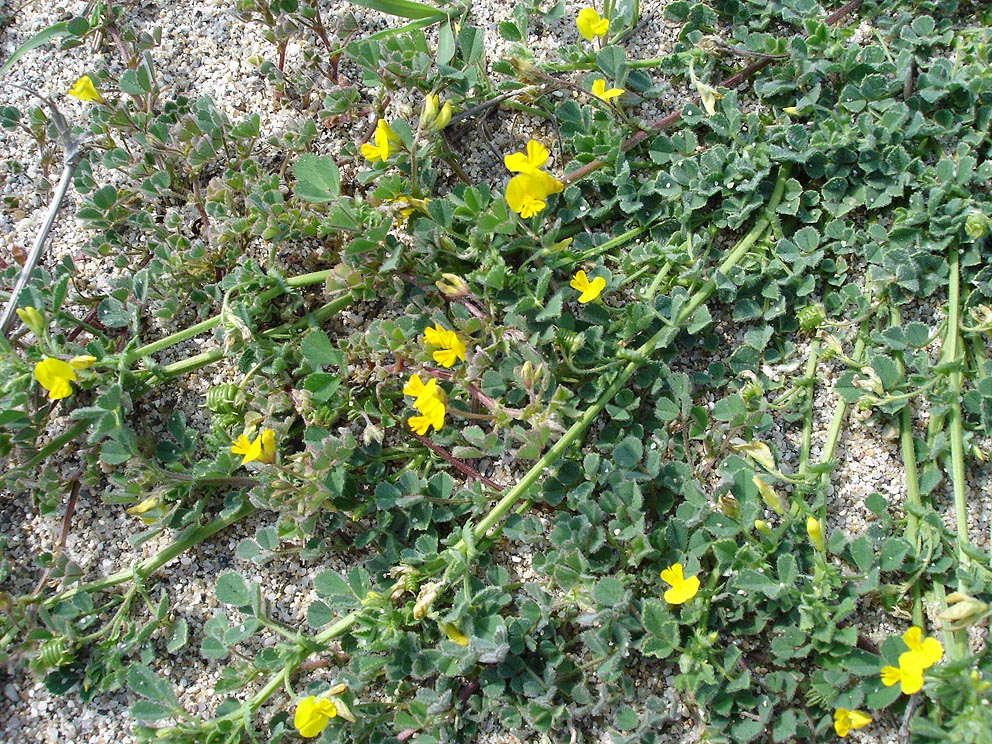
Medicago littoralis

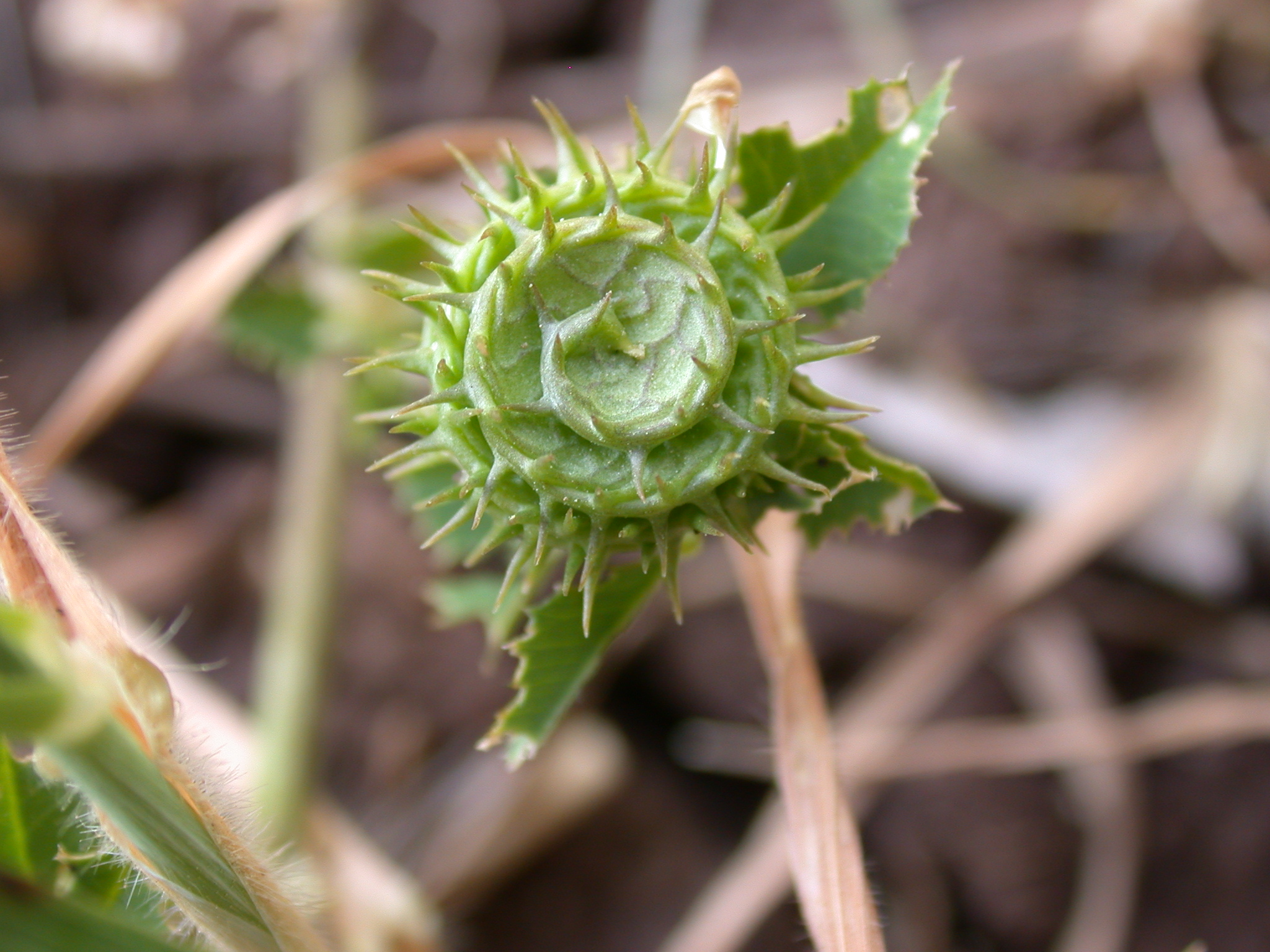
Medicago granadensis bur

== Taxonomy ==
The species Medicago truncatula is a model legume due to its relatively small stature, small genome (450–500 Mbp), short generation time (about 3 months), and ability to reproduce both by outcrossing and selfing.

Comprehensive descriptions of the genus are Lesinš and Lesinš 1979 and Small and Jomphe 1989. Major collections are SARDI (Australia), USDA-GRIN (United States), ICARDA (Syria), and INRA (France).

=== Species ===
The genus contains at least 87 species.

Recent molecular phylogenic analyses of Medicago indicate that the sections and subsections defined by Small & Jomphe, as outlined below, are generally polyphyletic. However, with minor revisions sections and subsections could be rendered monophyletic.

==== Section Buceras ====
===== Subsection Deflexae =====
- Medicago retrorsa (Boiss.) E. Small

===== Subsection Erectae =====
- Medicago arenicola (Huber-Mor.) E. Small
- Medicago astroites (Fisch. & Mey.) Trautv.
- Medicago carica (Huber-Mor.) E. Small
- Medicago crassipes (Boiss.) E. Small
- Medicago fischeriana (Ser.) Trautv.
- Medicago halophila (Boiss.) E. Small
- Medicago heldreichii (Boiss.) E. Small
- Medicago medicaginoides (Retz.) E. Small
- Medicago monantha (C. A. Meyer) Trautv.
- Medicago orthoceras (Kar. & Kir.) Trautv.
- Medicago pamphylica (Huber-Mor. & Sirjaev) E. Small
- Medicago persica (Boiss.) E. Small
- Medicago phrygia (Boiss. & Bal.) E. Small
- Medicago polyceratia (L.) Trautv.
- Medicago rigida (Boiss. & Bal.) E. Small

===== Subsection Isthmocarpae =====
- Medicago rhytidiocarpa (Boiss. & Bal.) E. Small
- Medicago isthmocarpa (Boiss. & Bal.) E. Small

===== Subsection Reflexae =====
- Medicago monspeliaca (L.) Trautv.

==== Section Carstiensae ====
- Medicago carstiensis Wulf.

==== Section Dendrotelis ====
- Medicago arborea L.
- Medicago citrina (Font Quer) Greuter (Note: Some sources treat Medicago citrina as a synonym of Medicago arborea.)
- Medicago strasseri Greuter, Matthas & Risse

==== Section Geocarpa ====
- Medicago hypogaea E. Small

==== Section Heynianae ====
- Medicago heyniana Greuter

==== Section Hymenocarpos ====
- Medicago radiata L.

==== Section Lunatae ====
- Medicago biflora (Griseb.) E. Small
- Medicago brachycarpa M. Bieb.
- Medicago huberi E. Small
- Medicago rostrata (Boiss. & Bal.) E. Small

==== Section Lupularia ====
- Medicago lupulina L.
- Medicago secundiflora Durieu

==== Section Medicago ====
- Medicago cancellata M. Bieb.
- Medicago daghestanica Rupr.
- Medicago hybrida (Pourr.) Trautv.
- Medicago marina L.
- Medicago papillosa Boiss.
  - M. p. macrocarpa
  - M. p. papillosa
- Medicago pironae Vis.
- Medicago prostrata Jacq.
  - M. p. prostrata
  - M. p. pseudorupestris
- Medicago rhodopea Velen.
- Medicago rupestris M. Bieb
- Medicago sativa L. (alfalfa)
  - M. s. caerulea
  - M. s. falcata (Medicago falcata)
    - M. s. f. var. falcata
    - M. s. f. var. viscosa
  - M. s. glomerata
  - M. s. sativa
- Medicago saxatilis M. Bieb
- Medicago suffruticosa Ramond ex DC.
  - M. s. leiocarpa
  - M. s. suffruticosa

==== Section Orbiculares ====
- Medicago orbicularis (L.) Bart.

==== Section Platycarpae ====
- Medicago archiducis-nicolai Sirjaev
- Medicago cretacea M. Bieb.
- Medicago edgeworthii Sirjaev
- Medicago ovalis (Boiss.) Sirjaev
- Medicago playtcarpa (L.) Trautv.
- Medicago plicata (Boiss.) Sirjaev
- Medicago popovii (E. Kor.) Sirjaev
- Medicago ruthenica (L.) Ledebour

===== Subsection Rotatae =====
- Medicago blancheana Boiss.
- Medicago noeana Boiss.
- Medicago rotata Boiss.
- Medicago rugosa Desr.
- Medicago scutellata (L.) Miller
- Medicago shepardii Post

==== Section Spirocarpos ====
===== Subsection Intertextae =====
- Medicago ciliaris (L.) Krocker
- Medicago granadensis Willd.
- Medicago intertexta (L.) Miller
- Medicago muricoleptis Tin.

===== Subsection Leptospireae =====
- Medicago arabica (L.) Huds.
- Medicago coronata (L.) Bart.
- Medicago disciformis DC.
- Medicago laciniata (L.) Miller
- Medicago lanigera Winkl. & Fedtsch.
- Medicago laxispira Heyn
- Medicago minima (L.) Bart.
- Medicago polymorpha L.
- Medicago praecox DC.
- Medicago sauvagei Nègre
- Medicago tenoreana Ser.

===== Subsection Pachyspireae =====
- Medicago constricta Durieu
- Medicago doliata Carmign.
- Medicago italica (Miller) Fiori
- Medicago lesinsii E. Small
- Medicago littoralis Rohde ex Lois.
- Medicago murex Willd.
- Medicago rigidula (L.) All.
- Medicago rigiduloides E. Small
- Medicago sinskiae Uljanova (Note: The validity of Medicago sinskiae has been questioned by Small and Jomphe, 1988.)
- Medicago soleirolii Duby
- Medicago sphaerocarpos Bertol.
- Medicago syriaca E. Small
- Medicago truncatula Gaertn.
- Medicago turbinata (L.) All.

==== Species names with uncertain taxonomic status ====
The status of the following species is unresolved:

- Medicago agropyretorum Vassilcz.
- Medicago alatavica Vassilcz.
- Medicago caucasica Vassilcz.
- Medicago cyrenaea Maire & Weiller
- Medicago difalcata Sinskaya
- Medicago grossheimii Vassilcz.
- Medicago gunibica Vassilcz.
- Medicago hemicoerulea Sinskaya
- Medicago karatschaica (A. Heller) A. Heller
- Medicago komarovii Vassilcz.
- Medicago meyeri Gruner
- Medicago polychroa Grossh.
- Medicago schischkinii Sumnev.
- Medicago talyschensis Latsch.
- Medicago transoxana Vassilcz.
- Medicago tunetana (Murb.) A.W. Hill
- Medicago vardanis Vassilcz.
- Medicago virescens Grossh.

=== Evolution ===
Medicago diverged from Glycine (soybean) about 53–55 million years ago (in the early Eocene), from Lotus (deervetch) 49–51 million years ago (also in the Eocene), and from Trigonella 10–22 million years ago (in the Miocene).

=== Etymology ===
The genus name is based on the Latin name for alfalfa, medica, from Greek: μηδική (πόα) Median (grass).

== Distribution and habitat ==
The genus is distributed mainly around the Mediterranean Basin, also extending across temperate Eurasia and sub-Saharan Africa.

== Ecology ==
=== Symbiosis with nitrogen-fixing rhizobia ===
Béna et al. (2005) constructed a molecular phylogeny of 23 Sinorhizobium strains and tested the symbiotic ability of six strains with 35 Medicago species. Comparison of these phylogenies indicates many transitions in the compatibility of the association over evolutionary time. Furthermore, they propose that the geographical distribution of strains limits the distribution of particular Medicago species.

=== Insect herbivores ===
Medicago species are used as food plants by the larvae of some Lepidoptera species including the common swift, flame, latticed heath, lime-speck pug, nutmeg, setaceous Hebrew character, and turnip moths and case-bearers of the genus Coleophora, including C. frischella (recorded on M. sativa) and C. fuscociliella (feeds exclusively on Medicago spp.).

== Agricultural uses ==
Agronomic research has been conducted on Medicago species. Other than its best-known member, alfalfa, several of the prostrate members of the family (such as M. lupulina and M. truncatula) have been used as forage crops. Select species in the Medicago genus naturally develop spiney pods during the reproductive phase of growth (such as M. intertexta and M. polymorpha). Despite having high levels of agronomic performance, these are typically viewed as undesirable in sheep based farming systems due to their ability to become lodged in wool, reducing fleece value. Breeding efforts in the 1990s have yielded spineless varieties of burr medic, providing valuable production amongst farming systems in low rainfall (<300mm annual), free draining, alkaline soils.
