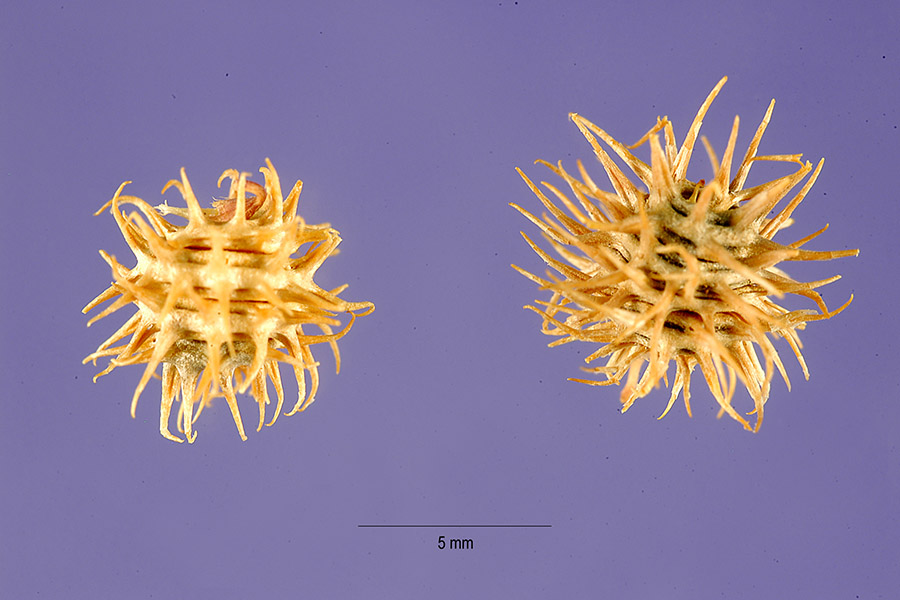
- Photograph of Medicago laciniata seed pods

Scientific classification
- Kingdom: Plantae
- Clade: Tracheophytes
- Clade: Angiosperms
- Clade: Eudicots
- Clade: Rosids
- Order: Fabales
- Family: Fabaceae
- Subfamily: Faboideae
- Genus: Medicago
- Species: M. laciniata

Binomial name
- Medicago laciniata (L.) Mill.

= Medicago laciniata =

Species of legume

Medicago laciniata is a plant species of the genus Medicago. It is found primarily in the southern Mediterranean basin. It forms a symbiotic relationship with the bacterium Sinorhizobium meliloti, which is capable of nitrogen fixation. Common names include cutleaf medick and tattered medick. Grows in Sinai, Egypt.

== Gallery ==
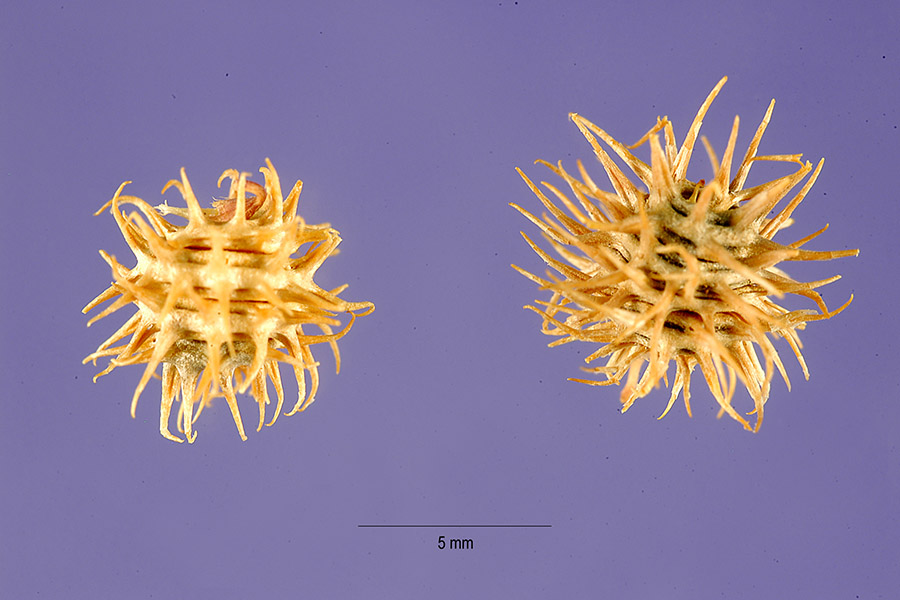
seed pods

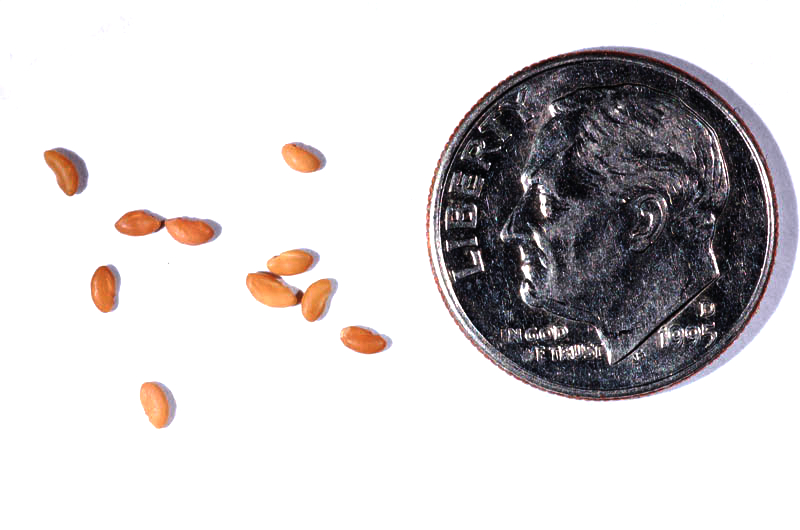
seeds
