= Ensifer medicae =

Scientific classification
- Domain: Bacteria
- Kingdom: Pseudomonadati
- Phylum: Pseudomonadota
- Class: Alphaproteobacteria
- Order: Hyphomicrobiales
- Family: Rhizobiaceae
- Genus: Ensifer
- Species: E. medicae

Binomial name
- Ensifer medicae Rome et al. 1996

Species of bacterium

Ensifer medicae (also known as Sinorhizobium medicae) is a species of gram-negative, nitrogen-fixing, rod-shaped bacteria. They can be free-living or symbionts of leguminous plants in root nodules. E.medicae was first isolated from root nodules on plants in the genus Medicago. Some strains of E.medicae, like WSM419, are aerobic. They are chemoorganotrophic mesophiles that prefer temperatures around 28 °C. In addition to their primary genome, these organisms also have three known plasmids, sized 1,570,951 bp, 1,245,408 bp and 219,313 bp.

Colonies of Ensifer medicae are mucoid and ring-shaped and can be viewed here.

== Phylogeny/Taxonomy ==
The genus is sometimes referred to as Sinorhizobium instead of Ensifer (see explanation at the genus article). Two major subgroups include E.medicae strain A321 and E. medicae strain WSM419. This phylogenetic tree shows relatedness to the rest of the Rhizobiaceae family based on 16s rRNA gene sequences.

== Ecological role and symbiosis with legumes ==
This bacterium is often involved in mutualistic relationships with legumes. It performs atmospheric nitrogen fixation for the plants and in exchange it receives organic carbon through the process of rhizodeposition. Free-living bacteria become housed inside specialized root cells in root nodules, which creates anaerobic microhabitat in which efficient N-fixation can occur. This mutualism has been observed with many plant species, including Medicago polymorpha and Medicago truncatula plants from around the world. The extent of the mutualism may be dependent upon soil pH, as it was thought that acidity can constrain Sinorhizobium medicae. Current thinking is that acid resistance, particularly in strain WSM419, can be transferred on plasmids.

== Agricultural Importance ==
Because E. medicae associates well with plants in the genus Medicago and increases plants growth, crop fields are commonly inoculated with the bacteria in addition to or in replacement of synthetic fertilizers.

Specialized strains are developed for challenging conditions. The SRDI554 strain is highly halotolerant, making it an ideal inoculum for the salt-tolerant pasture legume Melilotus siculus (messina). The WSM1115 is, on the other hand, acid-tolerant.
