= Astragalus adsurgens =

Astragalus adsurgens can refer to:

- Astragalus adsurgens Pall., a synonym of Astragalus laxmannii Jacq. subsp. laxmannii
- Astragalus adsurgens Torr., a synonym of Astragalus iodanthus S.Watson var. iodanthus
- Astragalus adsurgens Willd. ex Steud., a synonym of Astragalus varius S.G.Gmel. subsp. varius
