= Aerophila =

Aerophila may refer to:

- Caldilinea aerophila, species of bacteria
- Capillaria aerophila, species of parasite
- Microvirga aerophila, species of bacteria
- Roseomonas aerophila, species of bacteria
- Sphingomonas aerophila, species of bacteria
- Thiomicrospira aerophila, species of bacteria
- Zobellella aerophila, species of bacteria
