= 3-hydroxy-2-methylpyridine-4,5-dicarboxylate 4-decarboxylase =

Class of enzymes

Identifiers
- EC no.: 4.1.1.51
- CAS no.: 37289-49-9

Databases
- BRENDA: enzyme data
- ExPASy: NiceZyme view
- KEGG: enzyme entry
- MetaCyc: metabolic pathway
- Rhea: reactions
- PDB structures: RCSB PDB PDBe PDBsum
- Gene Ontology: AmiGO / QuickGO
Search
- PMC: articles
- PubMed: articles
- NCBI: proteins

The enzyme 3-hydroxy-2-methylpyridine-4,5-dicarboxylate 4-decarboxylase (EC 4.1.1.51) catalyzes the decarboxylation of 3-hydroxy-2-methylpyridine-4,5-dicarboxylic acid to 5-hydroxy-6-methylpyridine-3-carboxylic acid and carbon dioxide:

3-hydroxy-2-methylpyridine-4,5-dicarboxylic acid
CO_{2}
5-hydroxy-6-methylpyridine-3-carboxylic acid

The reaction is part of the breakdown pathway for vitamin B_{6} in bacteria such as Mesorhizobium loti.

This enzyme is a lyase, specifically a carboxy-lyase, which cleave carbon-carbon bonds. The systematic name of this enzyme class is 3-hydroxy-2-methylpyridine-4,5-dicarboxylate 4-carboxy-lyase (3-hydroxy-2-methylpyridine-5-carboxylate-forming). This enzyme is also called 3-hydroxy-2-methylpyridine-4,5-dicarboxylate 4-carboxy-lyase.
