= Metallidurans =

Metallidurans may refer to:

- Cupriavidus metallidurans, species of bacteria
- Mesorhizobium metallidurans, species of bacteria
