= 4-pyridoxolactonase =

Class of enzymes

Identifiers
- EC no.: 3.1.1.27
- CAS no.: 37278-41-4

Databases
- BRENDA: enzyme data
- ExPASy: NiceZyme view
- KEGG: enzyme entry
- MetaCyc: metabolic pathway
- Rhea: reactions
- PDB structures: RCSB PDB PDBe PDBsum
- Gene Ontology: AmiGO / QuickGO
Search
- PMC: articles
- PubMed: articles
- NCBI: proteins

4-pyridoxolactonase (EC 3.1.1.27) is an enzyme that catalyzes the reaction

4-pyridoxolactone
H_{2}O
4-pyridoxic acid

The enzyme characterised from Pseudomonas species and Mesorhizobium loti hydrolyses 4-pyridoxolactone to 4-pyridoxic acid. Its structure has been determined by X-ray crystallography. The reaction is part of the breakdown of vitamin B_{6} and pyridoxine.

This enzyme is a hydrolase, specifically one acting on carboxylic ester bonds. The systematic name is 4-pyridoxolactone lactonohydrolase.
