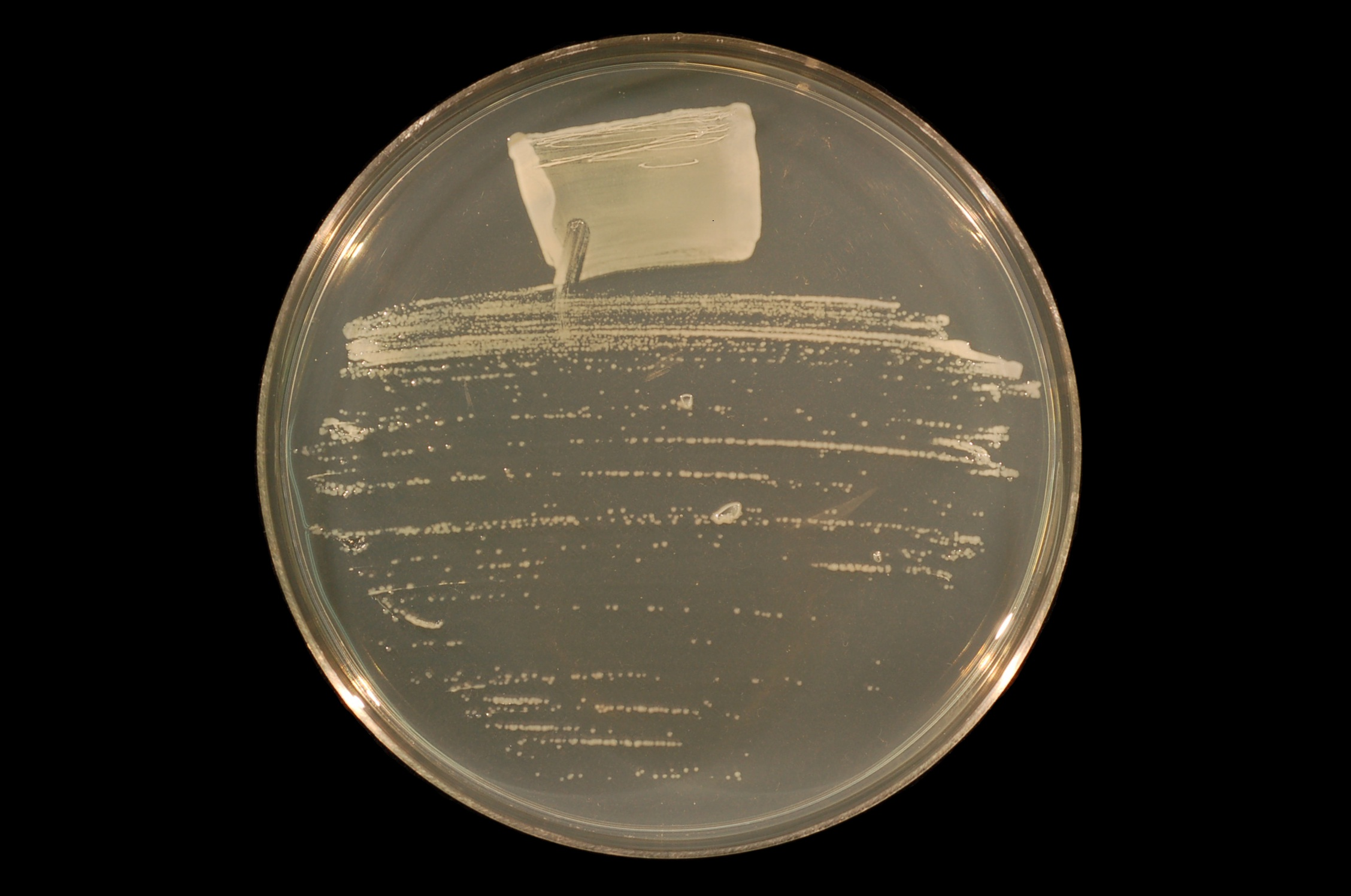
- Ensifer fredii USDA257 on an agar plate of typtone-yeast extract agar.

Scientific classification
- Domain: Bacteria
- Kingdom: Pseudomonadati
- Phylum: Pseudomonadota
- Class: Alphaproteobacteria
- Order: Hyphomicrobiales
- Family: Rhizobiaceae
- Genus: Ensifer; Casida, 1982

Type species
- Ensifer adhaerens Casida, 1982

Species
- "Sinorhizobium abri" Ogasawara et al. 2003; Ensifer adhaerens Casida 1982; Ensifer alkalisoli Li et al. 2016; Ensifer americanus corrig. (Toledo et al. 2004) Wang et al. 2015; Ensifer arboris (Nick et al. 1999) Young 2003; "Ensifer aridi" Le Quéré et al. 2017; "Ensifer aridi" Rocha et al. 2020; "Sinorhizobium chiapanecum" Rincón-Rosales et al. 2009; "Ensifer collicola" Jang et al. 2017; Ensifer fredii (Scholla and Elkan 1984) Young 2003; Ensifer garamanticus Merabet et al. 2010; Ensifer glycinis Yan et al. 2016; "Sinorhizobium indiaense" Ogasawara et al. 2003; Ensifer kostiensis (Nick et al. 1999) Young 2003; Ensifer kummerowiae (Wei et al. 2002) Young 2003; Ensifer medicae (Rome et al. 1996) Young 2003; Ensifer meliloti (Dangeard 1926) Young 2003; Ensifer mexicanus Lloret et al. 2007; Ensifer morelensis corrig. (Wang et al. 2002) Wang et al. 2015; Ensifer numidicus Merabet et al. 2010; Ensifer psoraleae Wang et al. 2013; Ensifer saheli (De Lajudie et al. 1994) Young 2003; symbiovar acaciae; symbiovar sesbaniae; Ensifer sesbaniae Wang et al. 2015; Ensifer shofinae Chen et al. 2017; Ensifer sojae Li et al. 2011; Ensifer terangae (De Lajudie et al. 1994) Young 2003; symbiovar acaciae; symbiovar sesbaniae

Synonyms
- Sinorhizobium Chen et al. 1988

= Ensifer (bacterium) =

Genus of bacteria

Ensifer (often referred to in literature by its synonym Sinorhizobium) is a genus of nitrogen-fixing bacteria (rhizobia), three of which (Ensifer meliloti, Ensifer medicae and Ensifer fredii) have been sequenced.

== Etymology ==
The generic epithet Ensifer derives from the Latin noun ensifer, "sword-bearer". The synonym Sinorhizobium is a combination of Medieval Latin noun sino ("China"), the Classical Greek noun rhiza ("root"), and the Classical Greek noun bios ("life"). Thus, the Neo-Latin generic epithet of the synonym Sinorhizobium means "a Rhizobium isolated from China", in turn referring to the related genus Rhizobium ("root-associated life form").

== Proper name ==
The name Ensifer was published in 1982 and the name Sinorhizobium was published in 1988 thus the latter is regarded as a later synonym and by the rules of the Bacteriological Code (1990 Revision) of the International Committee on Systematics of Prokaryotes (ICSP), the older name (Ensifer) takes priority. In response to a request that the single extant species of Ensifer (Ensifer adhaerens) be moved to Sinorhizobium, a special ICSP subcommittee was formed to evaluate the request. It was ultimately ruled that Ensifer retained priority and that all Sinorhizobium species be transferred to the genus Ensifer. However, both terms continue to be used in published scientific literature, with Sinorhizobium being the more common.

== Deprecated species ==
Two species have been described which have since been reclassified into existing species: Sinorhizobium morelense (now Ensifer adhaerens) and Sinorhizobium xinjiangense (now Ensifer fredii—though some dissent exists).

== Phylogeny ==
The currently accepted taxonomy is based on the List of Prokaryotic names with Standing in Nomenclature (LPSN). The following phylogeny is based on whole-genome analysis.

- - Ensifer
    - Ensifer adhaerens
    - - Ensifer arboris
      - - - Ensifer alkalisoli
          - Ensifer sojae
        - - Ensifer saheli
          - - Ensifer americanus
            - - Ensifer glycinis
              - - Ensifer shofinae
                - Ensifer fredii
  - outgroup
    Pararhizobium

This phylogeny is based on a constrained analysis of the 16S ribosomal RNA.

- - Ensifer
    - - - - - - - - - Ensifer glycinis
                    - Ensifer shofinae
                  - - Ensifer saheli
                    - - Ensifer alkalisoli
                      - Ensifer sojae
                - - Ensifer americanus
                  - - Ensifer fredii
                    - - Ensifer kummerowiae
                      - Ensifer xinjiangensis
              - - Ensifer arboris
                - - - Ensifer psoraleae
                    - Ensifer medicae
                  - - Ensifer numidicus
                    - Ensifer meliloti
            - Ensifer kostiensis
          - - - Ensifer garamanticus
              - Ensifer terangae
            - Ensifer mexicanus
        - Ensifer morelensis
      - Ensifer sesbaniae
    - Ensifer adhaerens
  - outgroup
    Pararhizobium
