= Phyllobacterium leguminum =

Scientific classification
- Domain: Bacteria
- Kingdom: Pseudomonadati
- Phylum: Pseudomonadota
- Class: Alphaproteobacteria
- Order: Hyphomicrobiales
- Family: Phyllobacteriaceae
- Genus: Phyllobacterium
- Species: P. leguminum

Binomial name
- Phyllobacterium leguminum Mantelin et al. 2006

Type strain
- CFBP 6745, LMG 22833, ORS 1419

Species of bacterium

Phyllobacterium leguminum is a Gram-negative bacteria from the genus of Phyllobacterium which was isolated from root nodules from the plants Argyrolobium uniflorum and Astragalus algerianus.
