= Mesorhizobium sediminum =

Scientific classification
- Domain: Bacteria
- Kingdom: Pseudomonadati
- Phylum: Pseudomonadota
- Class: Alphaproteobacteria
- Order: Hyphomicrobiales
- Family: Phyllobacteriaceae
- Genus: Mesorhizobium
- Species: M. sediminum

Binomial name
- Mesorhizobium sediminum Yuan et al. 2016

Type strain
- CCTCC AB 2014219, KCTC 42205, YIM 12096

Species of bacterium

Mesorhizobium sediminum is a Gram-negative, non-spore-forming, aerobic and non-motile bacterium from the genus of Mesorhizobium which has been isolated from deep-sea sediments from the Indian Ocean.
