= Mesorhizobium thiogangeticum =

Scientific classification
- Domain: Bacteria
- Kingdom: Pseudomonadati
- Phylum: Pseudomonadota
- Class: Alphaproteobacteria
- Order: Hyphomicrobiales
- Family: Phyllobacteriaceae
- Genus: Mesorhizobium
- Species: M. thiogangeticum

Binomial name
- Mesorhizobium thiogangeticum Ghosh and Roy 2006

Type strain
- DSM 17097, LMG 22697, MTCC 7001, Roy SJT

Species of bacterium

Mesorhizobium thiogangeticum is a gram-negative, catalase-positive, oxidase-negative, aerobic, non-spore-forming rod-shaped bacteria from the genus Mesorhizobium which was isolated from soil near the roots of Clitoria ternatea from a Gangetic plains in India.
