= Phyllobacterium ifriqiyense =

Scientific classification
- Domain: Bacteria
- Kingdom: Pseudomonadati
- Phylum: Pseudomonadota
- Class: Alphaproteobacteria
- Order: Hyphomicrobiales
- Family: Phyllobacteriaceae
- Genus: Phyllobacterium
- Species: P. ifriqiyense

Binomial name
- Phyllobacterium ifriqiyense Mantelin et al. 2006

Type strain
- CFBP 6742, LMG 22831, STM 370

Species of bacterium

Phyllobacterium ifriqiyense is a Gram-negative bacteria from the genus of Phyllobacterium which was isolated from root nodules from the plants Astragalus algerianus and Lathyrus numidicus.
