= Pararhizobium capsulatum =

Scientific classification
- Domain: Bacteria
- Kingdom: Pseudomonadati
- Phylum: Pseudomonadota
- Class: Alphaproteobacteria
- Order: Hyphomicrobiales
- Family: Rhizobiaceae
- Genus: Pararhizobium
- Species: P. capsulatum

Binomial name
- Pararhizobium capsulatum (Hirsch and Müller 1986) Mousavi et al. 2015

Type strain
- ATCC 43294 DSM 1112; IFAM 1004; M&#252; Müller 216; NCIMB 12291; VKM B-2063

Synonyms
- Blastobacter capsulatus Hirsch and Müller 1986

Species of bacterium

Pararhizobium capsulatum is a bacterium from the genus Pararhizobium which was isolated from eutrophic forest pond in Germany.
