= Mesorhizobium silamurunense =

Scientific classification
- Domain: Bacteria
- Kingdom: Pseudomonadati
- Phylum: Pseudomonadota
- Class: Alphaproteobacteria
- Order: Hyphomicrobiales
- Family: Phyllobacteriaceae
- Genus: Mesorhizobium
- Species: M. silamurunense

Binomial name
- Mesorhizobium silamurunense Zhao et al. 2012

Type strain
- CCBAU 01550, HAMBI 3029, LMG 24822

Species of bacterium

Mesorhizobium silamurunense is a bacterium from the genus Mesorhizobium which was isolated in China.
