= Phyllobacterium brassicacearum =

Scientific classification
- Domain: Bacteria
- Kingdom: Pseudomonadati
- Phylum: Pseudomonadota
- Class: Alphaproteobacteria
- Order: Hyphomicrobiales
- Family: Phyllobacteriaceae
- Genus: Phyllobacterium
- Species: P. brassicacearum

Binomial name
- Phyllobacterium brassicacearum Mantelin et al. 2006

Type strain
- Bertrand 29-15, CFBP 5551, LMG 22836, STM 196

Species of bacterium

Phyllobacterium brassicacearum is a Gram-negative, motile bacteria from the genus of Phyllobacterium which was isolated from rhizoplane of the plant Brassica napus.
