= Microvirga flocculans =

Scientific classification
- Domain: Bacteria
- Kingdom: Pseudomonadati
- Phylum: Pseudomonadota
- Class: Alphaproteobacteria
- Order: Hyphomicrobiales
- Family: Methylobacteriaceae
- Genus: Microvirga
- Species: M. flocculans

Binomial name
- Microvirga flocculans Weon et al. 2010

Type strain
- ATCC BAA-817, CIP 108443, IAM 15034, JCM 11936, KCTC 12101, LMG 25472, TFB

Synonyms
- Balneimonas flocculans Balneomonas flocculans

Species of bacterium

Microvirga flocculans is a bacterium from the genus Microvirga which has been isolated from water from a hot spring in the Gunma Prefecture in Japan.
