= Mesorhizobium acaciae =

Scientific classification
- Domain: Bacteria
- Kingdom: Pseudomonadati
- Phylum: Pseudomonadota
- Class: Alphaproteobacteria
- Order: Hyphomicrobiales
- Family: Phyllobacteriaceae
- Genus: Mesorhizobium
- Species: M. acaciae

Binomial name
- Mesorhizobium acaciae Zhu et al. 2015

Type strain
- CCBAU 101090, JCM 30534, RITF 1220, RITF 741, RITF 909

Species of bacterium

Mesorhizobium acaciae is a bacterium from the genus of Mesorhizobium which has been isolated from the nodules of the tree Acacia melanoxylon in Guangdong in China.
