= Microvirga arabica =

Scientific classification
- Domain: Bacteria
- Kingdom: Pseudomonadati
- Phylum: Pseudomonadota
- Class: Alphaproteobacteria
- Order: Hyphomicrobiales
- Family: Methylobacteriaceae
- Genus: Microvirga
- Species: M. arabica

Binomial name
- Microvirga arabica Veyisoglu et al. 2017

Type strain
- DSM 25393, KCTC 23864, NRRL-B 24874, SV2184P

Species of bacterium

Microvirga arabica is a Gram-negative bacterium from the genus Microvirga which has been isolated from arid soil from the Hira Cave in Saudi Arabia.
