= Mesorhizobium calcicola =

Scientific classification
- Domain: Bacteria
- Kingdom: Pseudomonadati
- Phylum: Pseudomonadota
- Class: Alphaproteobacteria
- Order: Hyphomicrobiales
- Family: Phyllobacteriaceae
- Genus: Mesorhizobium
- Species: M. calcicola

Binomial name
- Mesorhizobium calcicola De Meyer et al. 2016

Type strain
- HAMBI 3609, LMG 28224, ICMP 19559, ICMP 19560, ICMP 19561, ICMP 19562, ICMP 19563

Species of bacterium

Mesorhizobium calcicola is a Gram-negative and rod-shaped bacterium from the genus of Mesorhizobium which has been isolated from the root nodules of the tree Sophora in New Zealand.
