= Phyllobacterium endophyticum =

Scientific classification
- Domain: Bacteria
- Kingdom: Pseudomonadati
- Phylum: Pseudomonadota
- Class: Alphaproteobacteria
- Order: Hyphomicrobiales
- Family: Phyllobacteriaceae
- Genus: Phyllobacterium
- Species: P. endophyticum

Binomial name
- Phyllobacterium endophyticum Flores-Félix et al. 2013

Type strain
- CECT 7949, LMG 26470, PEPV15

Species of bacterium

Phyllobacterium endophyticum is a bacterium from the genus of Phyllobacterium which was isolated from a nodule of the plant Phaseolus vulgaris in Northern Spain.
