= Phyllobacterium myrsinacearum =

Scientific classification
- Domain: Bacteria
- Kingdom: Pseudomonadati
- Phylum: Pseudomonadota
- Class: Alphaproteobacteria
- Order: Hyphomicrobiales
- Family: Phyllobacteriaceae
- Genus: Phyllobacterium
- Species: P. myrsinacearum

Binomial name
- Phyllobacterium myrsinacearum (ex Knösel 1962) Knösel 1984 emend. Mergaert et al. 2002

Type strain
- ATCC 43590, CCUG 34961, CCUG 34962, CECT 4451, CFBP 5554, CIP 108241, DSM 5892, IAM 13583, IAM 13584, JCM 20931, JCM 20932, LMG 6738, NBRC 100019, NCIB 12127, STM 948

Synonyms
- Mycobacterium rubiacearum (ex von Faber 1912) Knösel 1984

Species of bacterium

Phyllobacterium myrsinacearum is a Gram-negative bacteria from the genus of Phyllobacterium which was isolated from sugar-beet roots. Phyllobacterium rubiacearum differs from Phyllobacterium myrsinacearum in only two nucleotides. Further analysis indicate that Phyllobacterium myrsinacearum and Phyllobacterium rubiacearum should be classified as only one species.
