= Microvirga subterranea =

Scientific classification
- Domain: Bacteria
- Kingdom: Pseudomonadati
- Phylum: Pseudomonadota
- Class: Alphaproteobacteria
- Order: Hyphomicrobiales
- Family: Methylobacteriaceae
- Genus: Microvirga
- Species: M. subterranea

Binomial name
- Microvirga subterranea Kanso and Patel 2003

Type strain
- ATCC BAA-295, DSM 14364, FaiI4

Synonyms
- Corbulabacter subterraneus

Species of bacterium

Microvirga subterranea is a Gram-negative, moderate thermophile, rod-shaped and aerobic bacteria with a single polar flagellum from the genus Microvirga which has been isolated from the Great Artesian Basin in Queensland in Australia.
