= Microvirga massiliensis =

Scientific classification
- Domain: Bacteria
- Kingdom: Pseudomonadati
- Phylum: Pseudomonadota
- Class: Alphaproteobacteria
- Order: Hyphomicrobiales
- Family: Methylobacteriaceae
- Genus: Microvirga
- Species: M. massiliensis

Binomial name
- Microvirga massiliensis Caputo et al. 2016

Type strain
- CSUR P153, DSM 26813, JC119

Synonyms
- Microvirga senegalensis

Species of bacterium

Microvirga massiliensis is a bacterium from the genus Microvirga which has been isolated from human feces in Dielmo in Senegal.
