= Phyllobacterium loti =

Scientific classification
- Domain: Bacteria
- Kingdom: Pseudomonadati
- Phylum: Pseudomonadota
- Class: Alphaproteobacteria
- Order: Hyphomicrobiales
- Family: Phyllobacteriaceae
- Genus: Phyllobacterium
- Species: P. loti

Binomial name
- Phyllobacterium loti Sánchez et al. 2014

Type strain
- CECT 8230, LMG 27289, S658T

Species of bacterium

Phyllobacterium loti is a bacterium from the genus of Phyllobacterium which was isolated from nodules from the plants Lotus corniculatus in Uruguay.
