= Microvirga guangxiensis =

Scientific classification
- Domain: Bacteria
- Kingdom: Pseudomonadati
- Phylum: Pseudomonadota
- Class: Alphaproteobacteria
- Order: Hyphomicrobiales
- Family: Methylobacteriaceae
- Genus: Microvirga
- Species: M. guangxiensis

Binomial name
- Microvirga guangxiensis Zhang et al. 2009

Type strain
- CGMCC 1.7666, JCM 15710, 25B

Species of bacterium

Microvirga guangxiensis is a Gram-negative, rod-shaped, strictly aerobic, non-spore-forming and non-motile bacteria from the genus Microvirga which has been isolated from soil from a rice field in the Guangxi Province in China.
