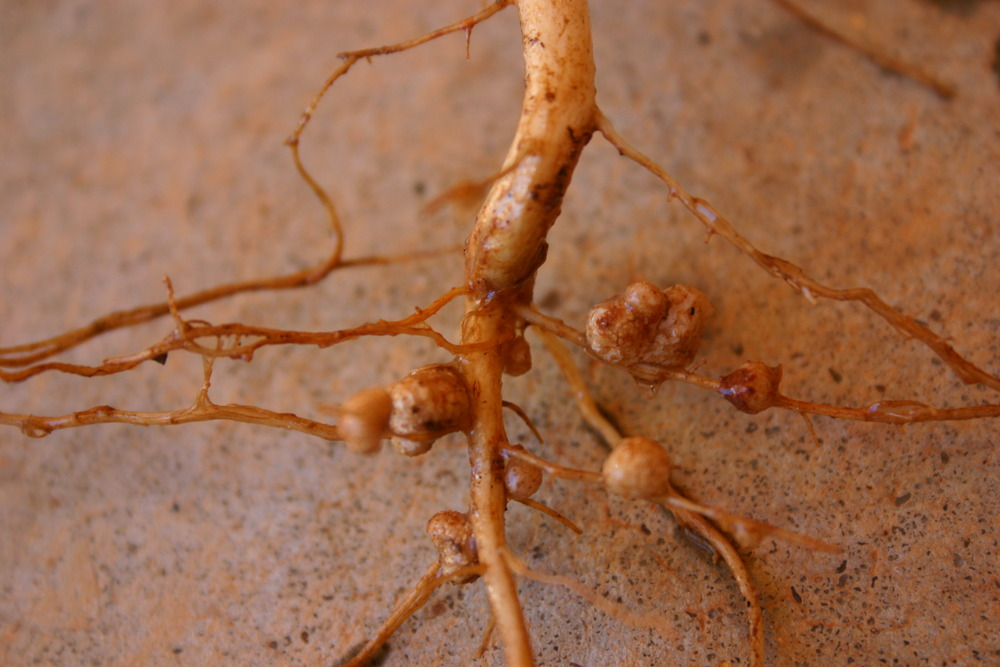
- Rhizobia nodules attached to roots of Vigna unguiculata

Scientific classification
- Domain: Bacteria
- Kingdom: Pseudomonadati
- Phylum: Pseudomonadota
- Class: Alphaproteobacteria
- Order: Hyphomicrobiales
- Family: Rhizobiaceae
- Genus: Ensifer
- Species: E. numidicus

Binomial name
- Ensifer numidicus Merabet et al. 2010

Type strain
- ORS 1444, ORS1410, ORS 1407, LMG 24690, CIP 109850, PN14, LBi2

= Ensifer numidicus =

Species of bacterium

Ensifer numidicus is a nitrogen fixing symbiont of Fabaceae. gram-negative, aerobic, non-spore forming, rod-shaped bacterium of the family Rhizobiaceae. First described in 2010; more biovars have since been isolated and described with ORS 1407 considered the representative organism. Most examples have been found in arid and infra-arid regions of Tunisia.

== Host plants ==
Biovars has been shown to induce nodule formation in a wide variety of symbiosis competent plant species including Medicago Sativa(cultivated alfalfa), Lotus creticus, Syrian mesquite(Prosopis farcta), Lens culinaris Medikus ssp(lentils) as well as Cicer arietinum(chickpea) and Argyrolobium uniflorum.

== Associated Biovars ==
Argyrolobium uniflorum: ORS 1407

cultivated alfalfa (Medicago sativa) :ORS 1407

Lotus creticus: PT26, ORS 1410

Cultivated lentils(Lens culinaris): ORS 1444

Cicer arietinum(chickpea):LBi_{2}

Syrian mesquite(Prosopis farcta):PN14

Known relationships between cultivars

- numidicus
  - ORS 1407
  - - ORS 1444
    - - - ORS 1410

This phylogeny is based on a constrained analysis of the 16S ribosomal RNA

== Genome ==
16s RNA analysis has found Ensifer numidicus to be closely related to Ensifer medicae and Ensifer garamanticus. Analogous genes between closely related species suggests high levels of horizontal gene transfer between closely related species. Laboratory inoculation has shown Ensifer numidicus engages in indeterminate nodulation with host plants in at least some circumstances.

== Growth conditions ==
E. numidicus has been found to grow on yeast-mannitol medium at 28C with an upper limit of 40C. Laboratory cultivated strains have found metabolism of at least 13 substrates including dulcitol, D-lyxose, 1-O-methyl a-D-glucopyranoside, 3-O-methyl-D-glucopyranose, D-gluconate, L-histidine, succinate, fumarate, ethanolamine, DL-b-hydroxybutyrate, L-aspartate, L-alanine and propionate. Sensitivity has been found to salt concentrations greater than 4%. Due to similarities to other Ensifer species, it cannot be described by growth conditions alone and must be differentiated by genetic components.
