= Mesorhizobium mediterraneum =

Scientific classification
- Domain: Bacteria
- Kingdom: Pseudomonadati
- Phylum: Pseudomonadota
- Class: Alphaproteobacteria
- Order: Hyphomicrobiales
- Family: Phyllobacteriaceae
- Genus: Mesorhizobium
- Species: M. mediterraneum

Binomial name
- Mesorhizobium mediterraneum Jarvis et al. 1997

Type strain
- ATCC 51670, ATCC 700745, BCRC 15796, CCRC 15796CECT 4847, CFBP 6716, CIP 107327, DSM 11555, DSMZ 11555, HAMBI 2096, IAM 15104, ICMP 13644, JCM 21565, KACC 10664, KCTC 12158, LMG 14994, LMG 17148, NBRC 102497, Nour UPM-Ca36, ORS 2739, strain Ca-7, UPM-Ca36, USDA 3392

Synonyms
- Rhizobium mediterraneum

Species of bacterium

Mesorhizobium mediterraneum is a bacterium from the genus Mesorhizobium, which was isolated from root nodule of the Chickpea (Cicer arietinum) in Spain. The species Rhizobium mediterraneum was subsequently transferred to Mesorhizobium mediterraneum. This species, along with many other closely related taxa, have been found to promote production of chickpea and other crops worldwide by forming symbiotic relationships.

== Symbiosis with Chickpea ==
As a typical species nodulating the chickpea root, M. mediterraneum forms a mutualistic symbiosis with the legume crop. The associations between M. mediterraneum and its legume hosts have been reported to be mediated by type IV secretion system (T4SS) genes such as traG and improved by the addition of the clpB chaperone gene. The invasion of legume by Mesorhizobium mediterraneum was also documented to involve production of hydrolytic enzymes such as xyloglucanase.

Several isolates of M. mediterraneum enhanced the growth of chickpea by efficiently mobilizing phosphorus from insoluble phosphates. The species could help chickpea increase production and protein content even under a moderate water deficit. However, it has also been reported that nodulation by the species on chickpea was reduced by water deficiency. Dual-inoculation of Glomus mosseae and M. mediterraneum helped Lathyrus sativus resist sulfate salinity stress, while the growth of M.mediterraneum was also found to be intolerant of salt stress of 200 mM NaCl. M. mediterraneum helped chickpea resist osmotic stress by enhancing nodular peroxidase and ascorbate peroxidase activities.

Besides chickpea, Mesorhizobium mediterraneum and/or closely related taxa have also been found to form symbiotic relationships with many other crops and plants, including wild liquorice (Astragalus glycyphyllos), lentil (Lens culinaris Medik), the South African legume species of the genus Lessertia, black locust (Robinia pseudoacacia), Lotus tenuis, Caragana, and Astragalus cicer.

Mesorhizobium mediterraneum, along with many other species, contributed to diverse rhizobia nodulating chickpea worldwide, such as Northeast China, India, the North-West Indo Gangetic Plains, Ethiopia, Iran, and Portugal. These findings contribute to valuable pools of isolates that hold promises for increasing chickpea production in these soil types.
