= Microvirga vignae =

Scientific classification
- Domain: Bacteria
- Kingdom: Pseudomonadati
- Phylum: Pseudomonadota
- Class: Alphaproteobacteria
- Order: Hyphomicrobiales
- Family: Methylobacteriaceae
- Genus: Microvirga
- Species: M. vignae

Binomial name
- Microvirga vignae Radl et al. 2014

Type strain
- HAMBI 3457, BR10192, BR10193, BR10194, BR10195

Species of bacterium

Microvirga vignae is a nitrogen-fixing bacteria from the genus Microvirga which has been isolated from the Brazilian Semiarid region.
