= Mesorhizobium septentrionale =

Scientific classification
- Domain: Bacteria
- Kingdom: Pseudomonadati
- Phylum: Pseudomonadota
- Class: Alphaproteobacteria
- Order: Hyphomicrobiales
- Family: Phyllobacteriaceae
- Genus: Mesorhizobium
- Species: M. septentrionale

Binomial name
- Mesorhizobium septentrionale Gao et al. 2004

Type strain
- CCBAU 11014, HAMBI 2582, LMG 23930, SDW014, strain SDW014

Species of bacterium

Mesorhizobium septentrionale is a gram-negative, aerobic, non-spore-forming bacteria from the genus Mesorhizobium which was isolated from Astragalus adsurgens in China.
