= Mesorhizobium temperatum =

Scientific classification
- Domain: Bacteria
- Kingdom: Pseudomonadati
- Phylum: Pseudomonadota
- Class: Alphaproteobacteria
- Order: Hyphomicrobiales
- Family: Phyllobacteriaceae
- Genus: Mesorhizobium
- Species: M. temperatum

Binomial name
- Mesorhizobium temperatum Gao et al. 2004

Type strain
- CCBAU 11018, HAMBI 2583, IAM 15333, JCM 21781, LMG 23931, SDW018

Species of bacterium

Mesorhizobium temperatum is a gram-negative, aerobic, non-spore-forming bacterium from the genus Mesorhizobium which was isolated from Astragalus adsurgens which were found in northern regions of China.
