= Microvirga indica =

Scientific classification
- Domain: Bacteria
- Kingdom: Pseudomonadati
- Phylum: Pseudomonadota
- Class: Alphaproteobacteria
- Order: Hyphomicrobiales
- Family: Methylobacteriaceae
- Genus: Microvirga
- Species: M. indica

Binomial name
- Microvirga indica Tapase et al. 2017

Type strain
- BCRC 80972, KACC 18792, NCIM-5595, strain S-MI1b

Synonyms
- Microvirga indicus

Species of bacterium

Microvirga indica is a Gram-negative, non-spore-forming and arsenite-oxidizing bacterium from the genus Microvirga which has been isolated from metal industry waste soil from Pirangut in India.
