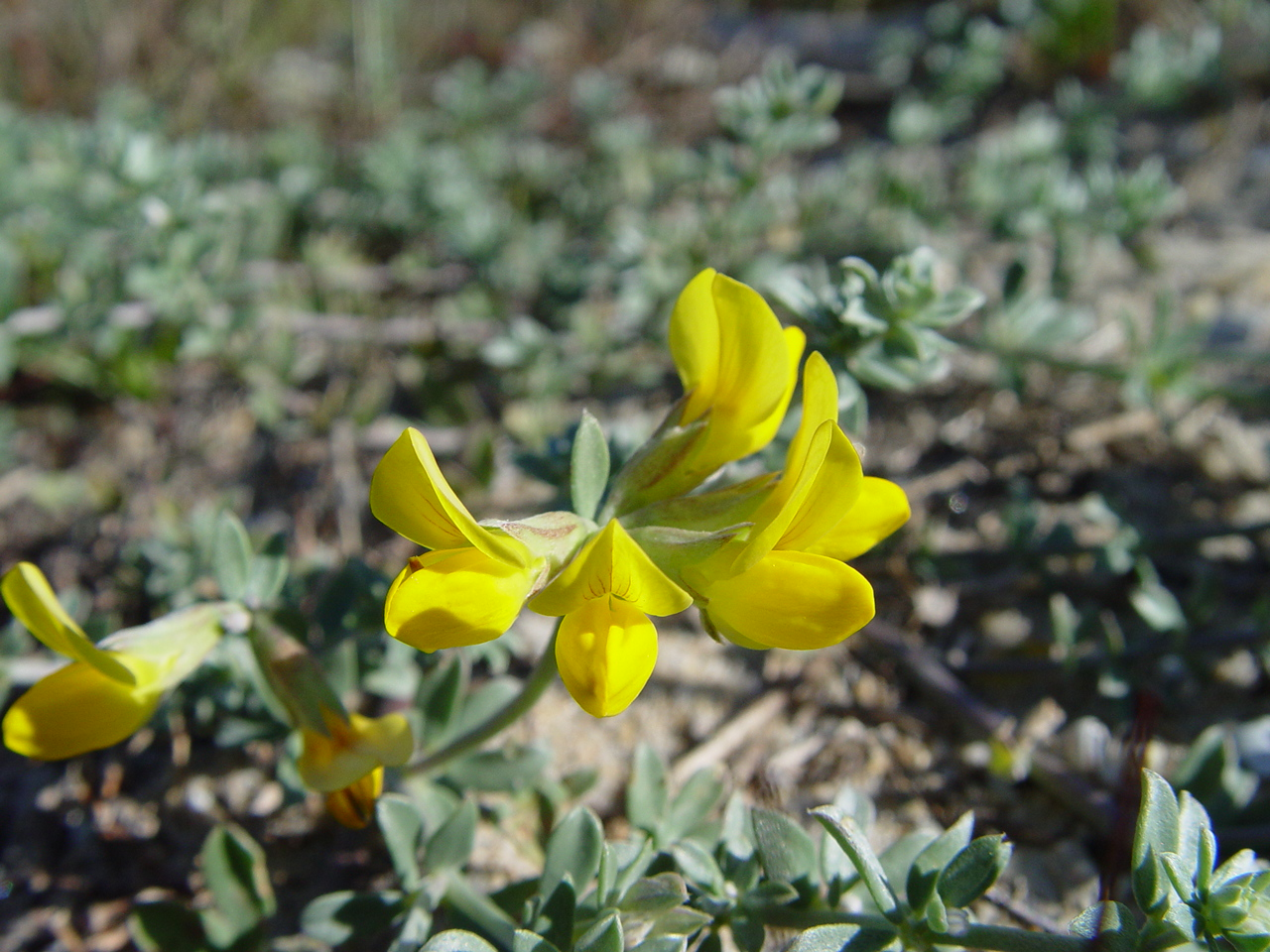

Scientific classification
- Kingdom: Plantae
- Clade: Tracheophytes
- Clade: Angiosperms
- Clade: Eudicots
- Clade: Rosids
- Order: Fabales
- Family: Fabaceae
- Subfamily: Faboideae
- Genus: Lotus
- Species: L. creticus

Binomial name
- Lotus creticus L.

= Lotus creticus =

Species of herb

Lotus creticus is a species of perennial herb of the family Fabaceae found in tropical Africa. It is symbiosis-competent and engages in nitrogen-fixing symbiotic interactions with species of the Ensifer genus[3][3]. It comprises three varieties found in the Mediterranean. There is some controversy as to whether each subgroup could be considered the same species but are classically described as being subgroups. Varieties consist of the most commonly cited silky-hairy var. creticus, which is widely distributed in its western part of the coast; the non-silky var. glabrescens, which has a western Mediterranean distribution; and the eastern Mediterranean var. collinus, which is also not silky and can be described by long petioles and peduncles.

== Morphology ==
Lotus creticus has been described as a perennial herb of 1–2F with diffuse copiously-branched densely grey-silky Appearance. Leaflets are fleshy and oblanceolate-cuneate. Flowers are in umbels with 4–8 on axillary peduncles. Pedicels are described as short and bracts as a compound, equalling or shorter than the calyx. Flowers are corolla yellow and twice the calyx with linear pods linear of 12–18 lines long, turgid with 9–15-seeds per pod.

== Symbiosis ==
Lotus creticus has been found to engage in nitrogen-fixing symbiosis with Ensifer numidicus.

== Distribution ==
Lotus creticus is native to the Spanish Mediterranean coast. It can be found in a wide range of habitats ranging from sandy to heavy saline soils and from sea level to high altitudes.

== Importance ==
Lotus creticus is used in agriculture as an alternative to traditional covering plants as they experience rapid growth, have higher yields than traditional alternatives, and are considered drought-resistant. L. creticus is also considered an important candidate for revegetation programs in Europe. It is a pioneer plant and can rapidly advance in poor soils. In studies comparing similar species in bioremediation, L. creticus showed the highest levels of dominance at the initial and oldest stages of the revegetation.
