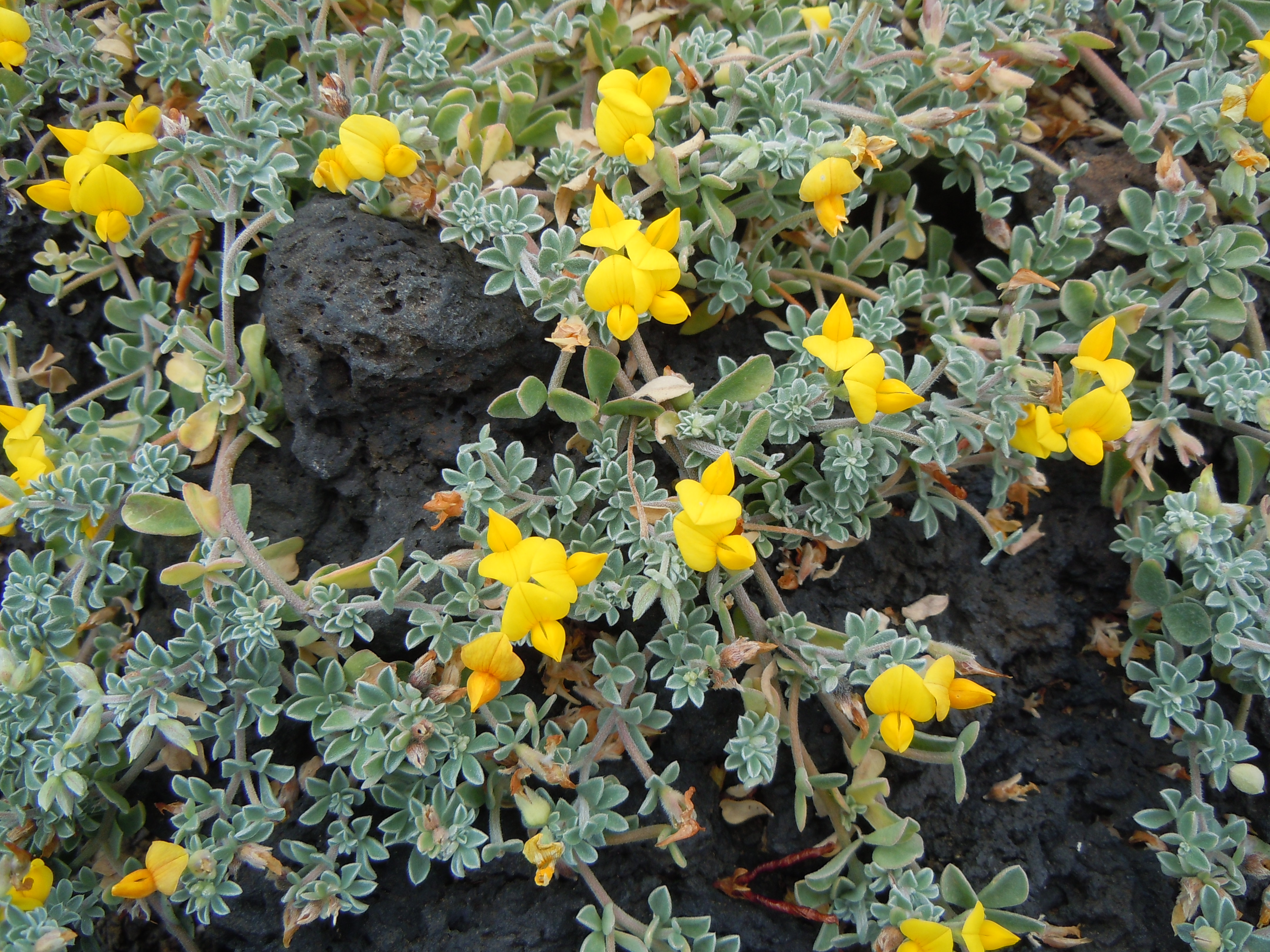

Scientific classification
- Kingdom: Plantae
- Clade: Tracheophytes
- Clade: Angiosperms
- Clade: Eudicots
- Clade: Rosids
- Order: Fabales
- Family: Fabaceae
- Subfamily: Faboideae
- Genus: Lotus
- Species: L. lancerottensis

Binomial name
- Lotus lancerottensis Webb & Berthel.

= Lotus lancerottensis =

Species of plant

Lotus lancerottensis or Lanzarote heartworm is a species of plant in the Lotus genus native to southern Madeira and the Canary Islands (Lanzarote and Fuerteventura).

== Description ==
This species is identified by its dark green leaves and puffed out yellow pea-like flowers. The leaves have fine spaced out whitish hairs.

== Conservation status ==
This species is classified as Threatened by the Kew database.

== Symbiosis ==
This species is in symbiosis with a fungus called Phyllobacterium salinisoli that helps the roots more efficiently process fatty acids.
