= Microvirga pakistanensis =

Scientific classification
- Domain: Bacteria
- Kingdom: Pseudomonadati
- Phylum: Pseudomonadota
- Class: Alphaproteobacteria
- Order: Hyphomicrobiales
- Family: Methylobacteriaceae
- Genus: Microvirga
- Species: M. pakistanensis

Binomial name
- Microvirga pakistanensis Amin et al. 2017

Type strain
- CGMCC 1.15074, KCTC 42496, NCCP-1258

Species of bacterium

Microvirga pakistanensis is a Gram-negative, non-spore-forming, strictly aerobic and non-motile bacterium from the genus Microvirga which has been isolated from desert soil from the Cholistan Desert in Pakistan.
