= Ensifer adhaerens =

Scientific classification
- Domain: Bacteria
- Kingdom: Pseudomonadati
- Phylum: Pseudomonadota
- Class: Alphaproteobacteria
- Order: Hyphomicrobiales
- Family: Rhizobiaceae
- Genus: Ensifer
- Species: E. adhaerens

Binomial name
- Ensifer adhaerens Casida 1982

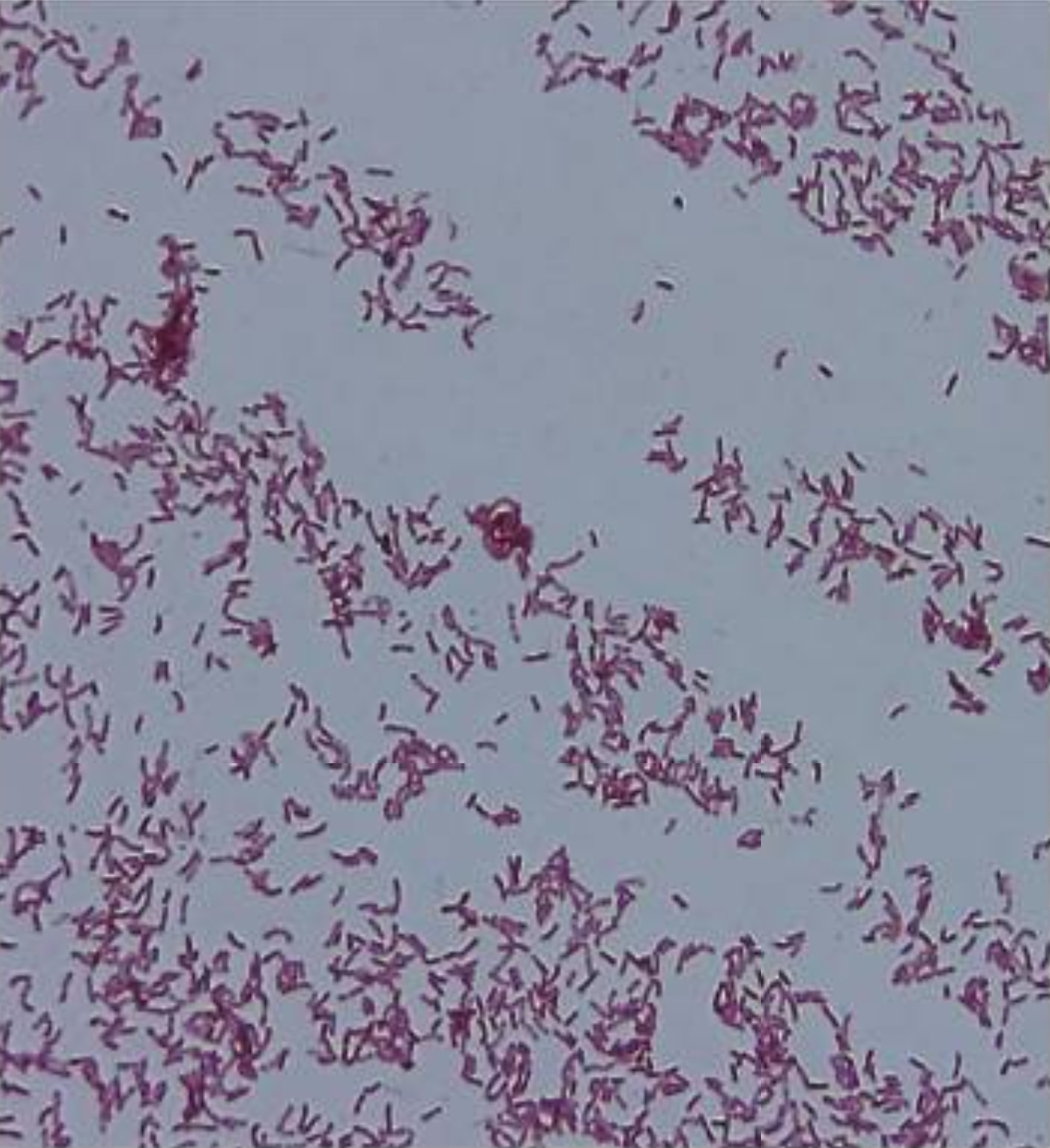
Ensifer adhaerens microscopy

Ensifer adhaerens is a Gram-negative facultatative predatory soil bacteria of the alphaproteobacteria class and family Rhizobiales. It is known for its ability to attach to other bacteria and cause lysis of host bacteria.

== Ecology and Genome ==
Ensifer adhaerens is Gram-negative and aerobic. It is capable of growth in a wide range of media and does not require prey bacteria to be present.

It was first isolated in 1980 and described in 1982, and sequence similarity has demonstrated it is closely related to Ensifer meliloti.

Although it does not normally engage in symbiosis, Ensifer adhaerens can perform nitrogen fixation and symbiosis with host-plants when given genes associated with nitrogen-fixation and symbiosis derived from other symbiotic Rhizobium.

The complete genome of the cultured laboratory strain Casida A was sequenced and published in 2017. Similarly to other bacteria within rhozobiales, they found it had three replicons including one major chromosome and two large plasmids. This totaled to 7,267,502 bp with 6,641 predicted open reading frames.

== Importance ==
The capability of Ensifer adhaerens to engage to predate on Gram-positive bacteria, including the genus Micrococcus, has made it a candidate for agricultural use as a potential antibacterial treatment for crops.
