= Mesorhizobium qingshengii =

Scientific classification
- Domain: Bacteria
- Kingdom: Pseudomonadati
- Phylum: Pseudomonadota
- Class: Alphaproteobacteria
- Order: Hyphomicrobiales
- Family: Phyllobacteriaceae
- Genus: Mesorhizobium
- Species: M. qingshengii

Binomial name
- Mesorhizobium qingshengii Zheng et al. 2013

Type strain
- CCBAU 33460, CGMCC 1.12097, HAMBI 3277, LMG 26793

Species of bacterium

Mesorhizobium qingshengii is a bacterium from the genus Mesorhizobium which was isolated from root nodules of Astragalus sinicus in the southeast of China.
