= Mesorhizobium huakuii =

Scientific classification
- Domain: Bacteria
- Kingdom: Pseudomonadati
- Phylum: Pseudomonadota
- Class: Alphaproteobacteria
- Order: Hyphomicrobiales
- Family: Phyllobacteriaceae
- Genus: Mesorhizobium
- Species: M. huakuii

Binomial name
- Mesorhizobium huakuii Jarvis et al. 1997

Type strain
- ATCC 51122, ATCC 700746, BCRC 15723, CCBAU 02609, CCRC 15723, CECT 4652, CFBP 6714, Chen 103, CIP 107328, DSMZ 6573, HAMBI 1674, HAMBI 2035, IAM 14158, ICMP 11069, IFO 15243, JCM 21036, KACC 10731, KCTC 12156, LMG 14107, NBRC 15243, NCIMB 13169, ORS 1752, OUT 30007, strain 103, USDA 4779

Synonyms
- Rhizobium huakuii

Species of bacterium

Mesorhizobium huakuii is a bacterium from the genus Mesorhizobium which was isolated from the legume Astragalus sinicus in Nanjing in China. Rhizobium huakuii was transferred to Mesorhizobium huakuii.
