= Phyllobacterium catacumbae =

Scientific classification
- Domain: Bacteria
- Kingdom: Pseudomonadati
- Phylum: Pseudomonadota
- Class: Alphaproteobacteria
- Order: Hyphomicrobiales
- Family: Phyllobacteriaceae
- Genus: Phyllobacterium
- Species: P. catacumbae

Binomial name
- Phyllobacterium catacumbae Jurado et al. 2005

Type strain
- CECT 5680, CIP 108923, CSC19, LMG 22520

Synonyms
- Phyllobacterium callistus

Species of bacterium

Phyllobacterium catacumbae is a Gram-negative, aerobic, motile bacteria with a polar tuft of flagella in the genus Phyllobacterium. It was isolated from the tuff (a type of rock) walls of Saint Callixtus' catacomb in Rome, Italy.
