= Microvirga soli =

Scientific classification
- Domain: Bacteria
- Kingdom: Pseudomonadati
- Phylum: Pseudomonadota
- Class: Alphaproteobacteria
- Order: Hyphomicrobiales
- Family: Methylobacteriaceae
- Genus: Microvirga
- Species: M. soli

Binomial name
- Microvirga soli Dahal and Kim 2017

Type strain
- KACC 18969, KEMB 9005-408, R491, NBRC 112417

Species of bacterium

Microvirga soli is a Gram-negative, methanol-utilizing, rod-shaped and non-spore-forming bacterium from the genus Microvirga which has been isolated from forest soil from Sichuan in China.
