= Phyllobacterium salinisoli =

Scientific classification
- Domain: Bacteria
- Kingdom: Pseudomonadati
- Phylum: Pseudomonadota
- Class: Alphaproteobacteria
- Order: Hyphomicrobiales
- Family: Phyllobacteriaceae
- Genus: Phyllobacterium
- Species: P. salinisoli

Binomial name
- Phyllobacterium salinisoli León-Barrios et al. 2018

Species of bacterium

Phyllobacterium salinisoli is a species of bacteria in the genus Phyllobacterium endemic to the Canary Islands.

== Discovery ==
This species was first/is found on the root nodules of Lotus lancerottensis, and is likely in symbiosis with the plant.

== Description ==
the cells of this species are rod shaped. Colonies are pale white. The bacteria takes 3 days to grow when incubated.
