= Microvirga aerilata =

Scientific classification
- Domain: Bacteria
- Kingdom: Pseudomonadati
- Phylum: Pseudomonadota
- Class: Alphaproteobacteria
- Order: Hyphomicrobiales
- Family: Methylobacteriaceae
- Genus: Microvirga
- Species: M. aerilata

Binomial name
- Microvirga aerilata Weon et al. 2010

Type strain
- 5420S-16, DSM 21343, KACC 12744, NBRC 106137

Species of bacterium

Microvirga aerilata is a bacterium from the genus Microvirga which has been isolated from air in Suwon in Korea.
