= Phyllobacterium bourgognense =

Scientific classification
- Domain: Bacteria
- Kingdom: Pseudomonadati
- Phylum: Pseudomonadota
- Class: Alphaproteobacteria
- Order: Hyphomicrobiales
- Family: Phyllobacteriaceae
- Genus: Phyllobacterium
- Species: P. bourgognense

Binomial name
- Phyllobacterium bourgognense Mantelin et al. 2006

Type strain
- Bertrand 31-25a, CFBP 5553, LMG 22837, STM 201

Species of bacterium

Phyllobacterium bourgognense is a Gram-negative, oxidase positive, motile bacteria from the genus of Phyllobacterium which was isolated from rhizoplane of the plant Brassica napus.
