= Microvirga ossetica =

Scientific classification
- Domain: Bacteria
- Kingdom: Pseudomonadati
- Phylum: Pseudomonadota
- Class: Alphaproteobacteria
- Order: Hyphomicrobiales
- Family: Methylobacteriaceae
- Genus: Microvirga
- Species: M. ossetica

Binomial name
- Microvirga ossetica Safronova et al. 2017

Type strain
- LMG 29787, V5/3M, RCAM 02728

Species of bacterium

Microvirga ossetica is a Gram-negative bacterium from the genus Microvirga which has been isolated from the nodules of the plant Vicia alpestris from North Ossetia.
