= Mesorhizobium australicum =

Scientific classification
- Domain: Bacteria
- Kingdom: Pseudomonadati
- Phylum: Pseudomonadota
- Class: Alphaproteobacteria
- Order: Hyphomicrobiales
- Family: Phyllobacteriaceae
- Genus: Mesorhizobium
- Species: M. australicum

Binomial name
- Mesorhizobium australicum Nandasena et al. 2009

Type strain
- HAMBI 3006, LMG 24608, Nandasena N14, Willems R-34166, WSM2073

Species of bacterium

Mesorhizobium australicum is a gram-negative bacteria from the genus of Mesorhizobium which was isolated from nodules on Biserrula pelecinus in Australia
