= Microvirga =

Scientific classification
- Domain: Bacteria
- Kingdom: Pseudomonadati
- Phylum: Pseudomonadota
- Class: Alphaproteobacteria
- Order: Hyphomicrobiales
- Family: Methylobacteriaceae
- Genus: Microvirga; Kanso and Patel 2003

Type species
- Microvirga subterranea Kanso and Patel 2003

Species
- Microvirga aerilata Weon et al. 2010; Microvirga aerophila Weon et al. 2010; Microvirga arabica Veyisoglu et al. 2017; Microvirga arsenatis Liu et al. 2021; Microvirga brassicacearum Jimenez-Gomez et al. 2022; "M. calopogonii" Wang et al. 2019; Microvirga flavescenss Zhang et al. 2019; Microvirga flocculans (Takeda et al. 2004) Weon et al. 2010; Microvirga guangxiensis Zhang et al. 2009; Microvirga indica Tapase et al. 2017; Microvirga lotononidis Ardley et al. 2012; Microvirga lupini Ardley et al. 2012; Microvirga makkahensis Veyisoglu et al. 2017; Microvirga massiliensis Caputo et al. 2016; "M. mediterraneensis" Boxberger et al. 2021; Microvirga ossetica Safronova et al. 2017; Microvirga pakistanensis Amin et al. 2017; "Microvirga rosea" Huq 2018; Microvirga soli Dahal and Kim 2017; Microvirga subterranea Kanso and Patel 2003; "M. thermotolerans" Li et al. 2020; "M. tunisiensis" Msaddak et al. 2019; Microvirga vignae Radl et al. 2014; Microvirga zambiensis Ardley et al. 2012

Synonyms
- Balneimonas corrig. Takeda et al. 2004; Balneomonas Takeda et al. 2004; "Corbulabacter" (informal name)

Genus of bacteria

Microvirga is a genus of bacteria from the family Methylobacteriaceae.
