= Mesorhizobium sangaii =

Scientific classification
- Domain: Bacteria
- Kingdom: Pseudomonadati
- Phylum: Pseudomonadota
- Class: Alphaproteobacteria
- Order: Hyphomicrobiales
- Family: Phyllobacteriaceae
- Genus: Mesorhizobium
- Species: M. sangaii

Binomial name
- Mesorhizobium sangaii Zhou et al. 2013

Type strain
- ACCC 13218, HAMBI 3318, SCAU7

Species of bacterium

Mesorhizobium sangaii is a bacterium from the genus Mesorhizobium which was isolated from root nodules of Astragalus luteolus and Astragalus ernestii in the Sichuan Province in China.
