= Mesorhizobium chacoense =

Scientific classification
- Domain: Bacteria
- Kingdom: Pseudomonadati
- Phylum: Pseudomonadota
- Class: Alphaproteobacteria
- Order: Hyphomicrobiales
- Family: Phyllobacteriaceae
- Genus: Mesorhizobium
- Species: M. chacoense

Binomial name
- Mesorhizobium chacoense Velázquez et al. 2001

Type strain
- CECT 5336, CFBP 6713, CIP 107324, DSM 17287, KCTC 12945, LMG 19008, Pr5, R-6566, STM 2154

Species of bacterium

Mesorhizobium chacoense is a gram-negative, aerobic, non-spore-forming, motile bacteria from the genus of Mesorhizobium which was isolated from root nodules of Prosopis alba in the Chaco Arido region in Argentina.
