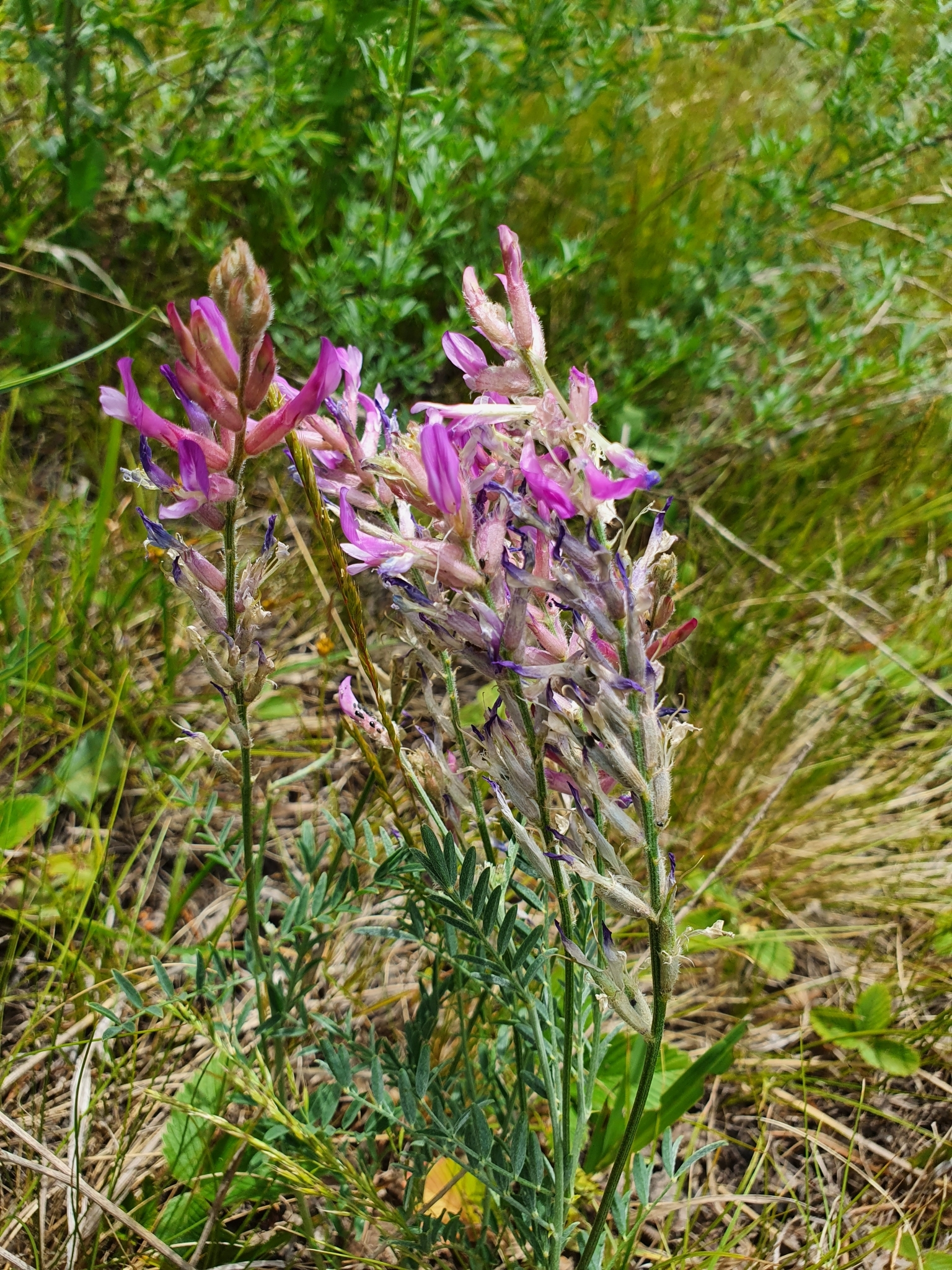
- Habit
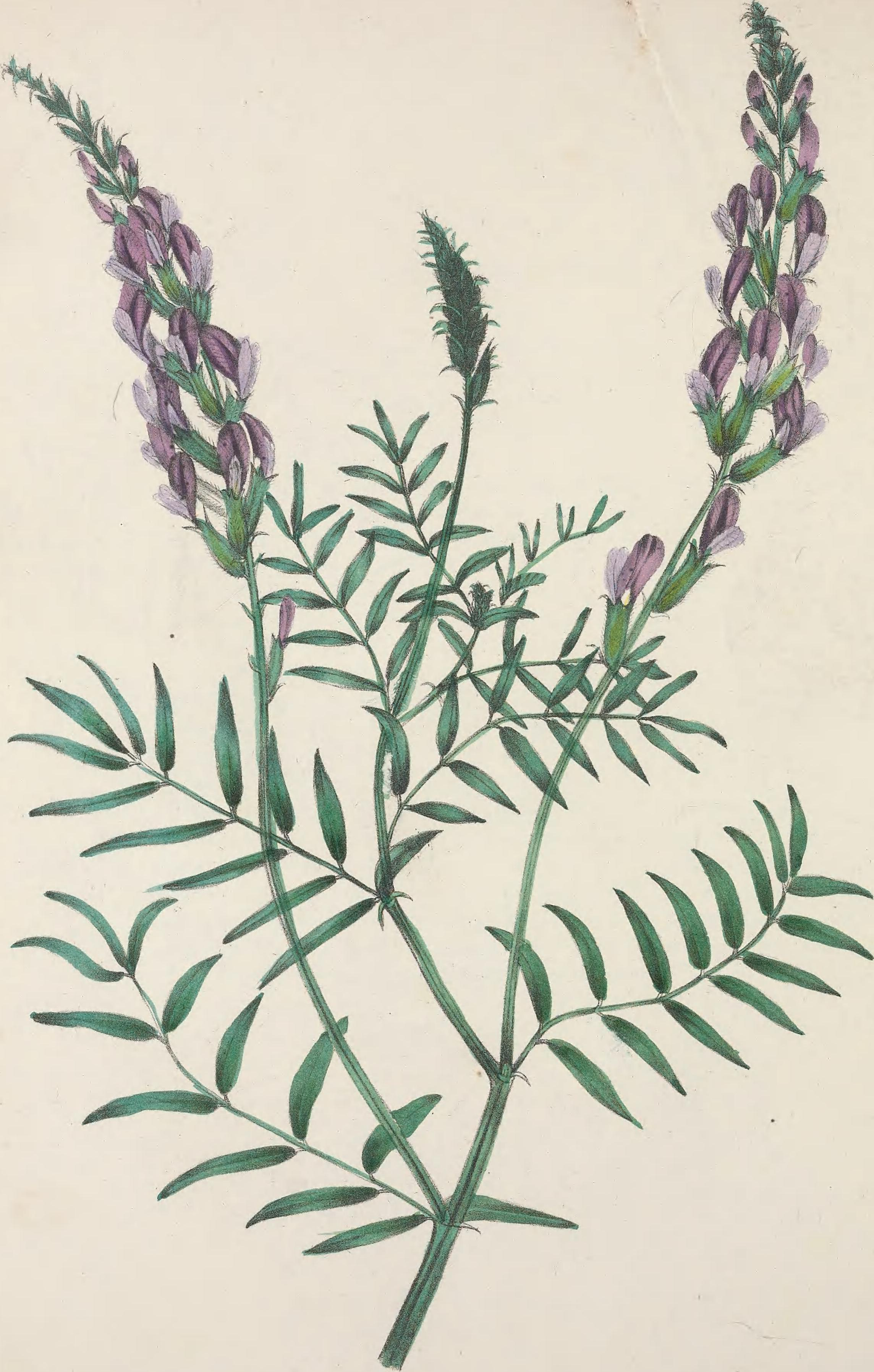
- Botanical illustration

Scientific classification
- Kingdom: Plantae
- Clade: Tracheophytes
- Clade: Angiosperms
- Clade: Eudicots
- Clade: Rosids
- Order: Fabales
- Family: Fabaceae
- Subfamily: Faboideae
- Genus: Astragalus
- Species: A. varius

Binomial name
- Astragalus varius S.G.Gmel.

Synonyms
- List: Astragalus adsurgens Willd. ex Steud.; Astragalus ammophilus M.Bieb. ex Besser; Astragalus bohemicus J.C.Mayer; Astragalus novus Winterl; Astragalus varius f. albiflorus (D.Brândză) Kožuharov & D.K.Pavlova; Astragalus varius var. albiflorus (D.Brândză) Vulev; Astragalus virgatus Pall.; Astragalus virgatus var. albiflorus D.Brândză; Solenotus virgatus (Pall.) Steven; Tragacantha virgata (Pall.) Kuntze

= Astragalus varius =

Species of plant

Astragalus varius is a species of flowering plant in the family Fabaceae. It is native to Hungary, Romania, Bulgaria, Ukraine, European Russia, the northern Caucasus, western Siberia, and Kazakhstan. A perennial subshrub, it may be a product of reticulate speciation within section Dissitiflori.

== Subtaxa ==
The following subspecies are accepted:

- Astragalus varius subsp. eupatoricus Sytin – Crimea
- Astragalus varius subsp. varius – entire range
