= Mesorhizobium shangrilense =

Scientific classification
- Domain: Bacteria
- Kingdom: Pseudomonadati
- Phylum: Pseudomonadota
- Class: Alphaproteobacteria
- Order: Hyphomicrobiales
- Family: Phyllobacteriaceae
- Genus: Mesorhizobium
- Species: M. shangrilense

Binomial name
- Mesorhizobium shangrilense Lu et al. 2009

Type strain
- CCBAU 65327, HAMBI 3050, LMG 24762

Species of bacterium

Mesorhizobium shangrilense is a gram-negative, aerobic, non-spore-forming bacterium from the genus Mesorhizobium which was isolated from root nodules of Caragana bicolor which were found in Deqin City in the Yunnan Province in China.
