= Mesorhizobium plurifarium =

Scientific classification
- Domain: Bacteria
- Kingdom: Pseudomonadati
- Phylum: Pseudomonadota
- Class: Alphaproteobacteria
- Order: Hyphomicrobiales
- Family: Phyllobacteriaceae
- Genus: Mesorhizobium
- Species: M. plurifarium

Binomial name
- Mesorhizobium plurifarium de Lajudie et al. 1998

Species of bacterium

Mesorhizobium plurifarium is a species of root nodule bacteria first isolated from Acacia species in Senegal. Its type strain is ORS 1032 (= LMG 11892).
