= Mesorhizobium tarimense =

Scientific classification
- Domain: Bacteria
- Kingdom: Pseudomonadati
- Phylum: Pseudomonadota
- Class: Alphaproteobacteria
- Order: Hyphomicrobiales
- Family: Phyllobacteriaceae
- Genus: Mesorhizobium
- Species: M. tarimense

Binomial name
- Mesorhizobium tarimense Han et al. 2008

Type strain
- CCBAU 83306, HAMBI 2973, LMG 23952, LMG 24338

Species of bacterium

Mesorhizobium tarimense is a gram-negative, aerobic, non-spore-forming bacteria from the genus Mesorhizobium which was isolated from wild growing legumes which were collected from soils of Xinjiang in China.
