= Mesorhizobium tianshanense =

Scientific classification
- Domain: Bacteria
- Kingdom: Pseudomonadati
- Phylum: Pseudomonadota
- Class: Alphaproteobacteria
- Order: Hyphomicrobiales
- Family: Phyllobacteriaceae
- Genus: Mesorhizobium
- Species: M. tianshanense

Binomial name
- Mesorhizobium tianshanense Chen et al. 1995, amend. Jarvis et al. 1997

Species of bacterium

Mesorhizobium tianshanense, formerly known as Rhizobium tianshanense, is a Gram negative species of bacteria found in the root nodules of many plant species. Its type strain is A-1BS (= CCBAU3306).
