= Mesorhizobium robiniae =

Scientific classification
- Domain: Bacteria
- Kingdom: Pseudomonadati
- Phylum: Pseudomonadota
- Class: Alphaproteobacteria
- Order: Hyphomicrobiales
- Family: Phyllobacteriaceae
- Genus: Mesorhizobium
- Species: M. robiniae

Binomial name
- Mesorhizobium robiniae Zhou et al. 2010

Type strain
- ACCC 14543, CCNWYC 115, HAMBI 3082

Species of bacterium

Mesorhizobium robiniae is a gram-negative, aerobic, non-spore-forming motile bacteria from the genus Mesorhizobium which was isolated from root nodule of Robinia pseudoacacia which was found in Yangling in the Shaanxi province in China.
