= Mesorhizobium muleiense =

Scientific classification
- Domain: Bacteria
- Kingdom: Pseudomonadati
- Phylum: Pseudomonadota
- Class: Alphaproteobacteria
- Order: Hyphomicrobiales
- Family: Phyllobacteriaceae
- Genus: Mesorhizobium
- Species: M. muleiense

Binomial name
- Mesorhizobium muleiense Zhang et al. 2012

Type strain
- CCBAU 83963, CGMCC 1.11022, HAMBI 3264

Species of bacterium

Mesorhizobium muleiense is a bacterium from the genus Mesorhizobium which was isolated from Cicer arietinum in Xinjiang in China.
