= Mesorhizobium gobiense =

Scientific classification
- Domain: Bacteria
- Kingdom: Pseudomonadati
- Phylum: Pseudomonadota
- Class: Alphaproteobacteria
- Order: Hyphomicrobiales
- Family: Phyllobacteriaceae
- Genus: Mesorhizobium
- Species: M. gobiense

Binomial name
- Mesorhizobium gobiense Han et al. 2008

Type strain
- CCBAU 83330, HAMBI 2974, LMG 23949

Species of bacterium

Mesorhizobium gobiense is a gram-negative, aerobic, non-spore-forming bacteria from the genus of Mesorhizobium which was isolated from desert soils in the Xinjiang region in China.
