= Mesorhizobium camelthorni =

Scientific classification
- Domain: Bacteria
- Kingdom: Pseudomonadati
- Phylum: Pseudomonadota
- Class: Alphaproteobacteria
- Order: Hyphomicrobiales
- Family: Phyllobacteriaceae
- Genus: Mesorhizobium
- Species: M. camelthorni

Binomial name
- Mesorhizobium camelthorni NandChen et al. 2011

Type strain
- ACCC 14549, CCNWXJ 40-4, HAMBI 3020

Species of bacterium

Mesorhizobium camelthorni is a gram-negative aerobic, non-spore-forming, motile bacteria from the genus of Mesorhizobium which was isolated from Alhagi sparsifolia in Alaer in the Xinjiang Province in China.
