= Phyllobacterium trifolii =

Scientific classification
- Domain: Bacteria
- Kingdom: Pseudomonadati
- Phylum: Pseudomonadota
- Class: Alphaproteobacteria
- Order: Hyphomicrobiales
- Family: Phyllobacteriaceae
- Genus: Phyllobacterium
- Species: P. trifolii

Binomial name
- Phyllobacterium trifolii Valverde et al. 2005

Species of bacterium

Phyllobacterium trifolii is a root-nodulating bacteria that was first isolated from nodules in Trifolium and Lupinus species. Its type strain is PETP02^{T} (=LMG 22712^{T} =CECT 7015^{T}).
