= Mesorhizobium hawassense =

Scientific classification
- Domain: Bacteria
- Kingdom: Pseudomonadati
- Phylum: Pseudomonadota
- Class: Alphaproteobacteria
- Order: Hyphomicrobiales
- Family: Phyllobacteriaceae
- Genus: Mesorhizobium
- Species: M. hawassense

Binomial name
- Mesorhizobium hawassense Degefu et al. 2013

Type strain
- AC99b, HAMBI 3301, LMG 26968

Species of bacterium

Mesorhizobium hawassense is a bacterium from the genus of Mesorhizobium which was isolated from root nodules.
