= Phyllobacterium sophorae =

Scientific classification
- Domain: Bacteria
- Kingdom: Pseudomonadati
- Phylum: Pseudomonadota
- Class: Alphaproteobacteria
- Order: Hyphomicrobiales
- Family: Phyllobacteriaceae
- Genus: Phyllobacterium
- Species: P. sophorae

Binomial name
- Phyllobacterium sophorae Jiao et al. 2015

Type strain
- CCBAU 03422, HAMBI 3508, LMG 27899, CCBAU 03415, strain A-6-3

Species of bacterium

Phyllobacterium sophorae is a Gram-negative bacteria in the genus Phyllobacterium which has been isolated from the root nodules of the plant Sophora flavescens.
