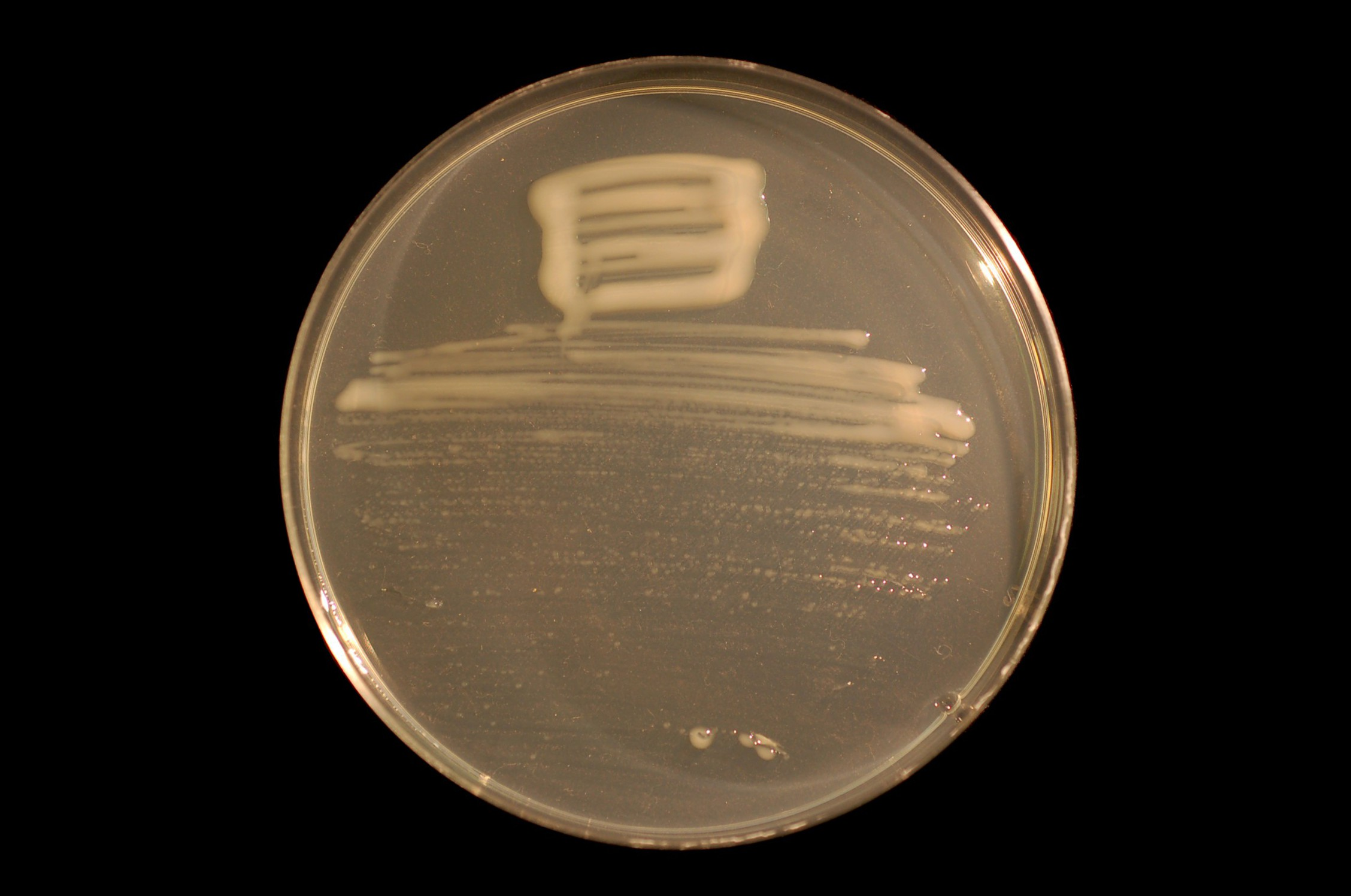
- Mesorhizobium japonicum strain MAFF303099 on an agar plate.

Scientific classification
- Domain: Bacteria
- Kingdom: Pseudomonadati
- Phylum: Pseudomonadota
- Class: Alphaproteobacteria
- Order: Hyphomicrobiales
- Family: Phyllobacteriaceae
- Genus: Mesorhizobium; Jarvis et al. 1997

Type species
- Mesorhizobium loti

Species
- See text.

= Mesorhizobium =

Genus of bacteria

Mesorhizobium is a genus of Gram-negative soil bacteria. At least one, the nitrogen fixing species, Mesorhizobium loti, forms symbiotic root nodules with plants in the genus Lotus. Strain MAFF303099 of M. japonicum has been fully sequenced.

== Species ==
=== Accepted Species ===
Mesorhizobium comprises the following species:

- M. abyssinicae Degefu et al. 2013
- M. acaciae Zhu et al. 2015
- M. albiziae Wang et al. 2007
- M. alhagi Chen et al. 2010
- M. amorphae Wang et al. 1999
- M. atlanticum Ferraz Helene et al. 2019
- M. australicum Nandasena et al. 2009
- M. calcicola De Meyer et al. 2016
- M. camelthorni Chen et al. 2010
- M. cantuariense De Meyer et al. 2015
- M. caraganae Guan et al. 2008
- M. carbonis Li et al. 2019
- M. carmichaelinearum De Meyer et al. 2019
- M. chacoense Velázquez et al. 2001
- M. ciceri (Nour et al. 1994) Jarvis et al. 1997
- M. composti Lin et al. 2020
- M. delmotii Mohamad et al. 2018
- M. ephedrae Liu et al. 2018
- M. erdmanii Martínez-Hidalgo et al. 2015
- M. gobiense Han et al. 2008
- M. hankyongi Siddiqi et al. 2019
- M. hawassense Degefu et al. 2013
- M. helmanticense Marcos-García et al. 2017
- M. huakuii (Chen et al. 1991) Jarvis et al. 1997
- M. japonicumMartinez-Hidalgo et al. 2016
- M. jarvisii Martínez-Hidalgo et al. 2015
- M. kowhai De Meyer et al. 2016
- M. loti (Jarvis et al. 1982) Jarvis et al. 1997
- M. mediterraneum (Nour et al. 1995) Jarvis et al. 1997
- M. metallidurans Vidal et al. 2009
- M. muleiense Zhang et al. 2012
- M. newzealandenseDe Meyer et al. 2016
- M. norvegicum Kabdullayeva et al. 2020
- M. oceanicum Fu et al. 2017
- M. olivaresii Lorite et al. 2017
- M. opportunistum Nandasena et al. 2009
- M. plurifarium de Lajudie et al. 1998
- M. prunaredense Mohamad et al. 2018
- M. qingshengii Zheng et al. 2013
- M. robiniae Zhou et al. 2010
- M. sangaii Zhou et al. 2013
- M. sanjuanii Sannazzaro et al. 2018
- M. sediminum Yuan et al. 2016
- M. septentrionale Gao et al. 2004
- M. shangrilense Lu et al. 2009
- M. shonense Degefu et al. 2013
- M. silamurunense Zhao et al. 2012
- M. soli Nguyen et al. 2015
- M. sophorae De Meyer et al. 2016
- M. tamadayense Ramírez-Bahena et al. 2012
  - symbiovar loti
  - symbiovar tamadayense
- M. tarimense Han et al. 2008
- M. temperatum Gao et al. 2004
- M. terrae Jung et al. 2021
- M. thiogangeticum Ghosh and Roy 2006
- M. tianshanense (Chen et al. 1995) Jarvis et al. 1997
- M. waimense De Meyer et al. 2015
- M. waitakense De Meyer et al. 2016
- M. wenxiniae Zhang et al. 2018

=== Provisional Species ===
The following species have been described, but not validated according to the Bacteriological Code:

- "M. alexandrii" Yang et al. 2020
- "M. denitrificans" Siddiqi et al. 2019
- "Candidatus Mesorhizobium hominis" Lo et al. 2013
- "M. hungaricum" Crovadore et al. 2016
- "M. intechi" Estrella et al. 2020
- "M. rhizophilum" Gao et al. 2020
- "M. zhangyense" Xu et al. 2018
