= Mesorhizobium abyssinicae =

Scientific classification
- Domain: Bacteria
- Kingdom: Pseudomonadati
- Phylum: Pseudomonadota
- Class: Alphaproteobacteria
- Order: Hyphomicrobiales
- Family: Phyllobacteriaceae
- Genus: Mesorhizobium
- Species: M. abyssinicae

Binomial name
- Mesorhizobium abyssinicae Degefu et al. 2013

Type strain
- AC98c, HAMBI 3306, LMG 26967

Species of bacterium

Mesorhizobium abyssinicae is a bacterium from the genus of Mesorhizobium which was isolated from root nodules of agroforestry legume trees in southern Ethiopia.
