= Microvirga aerophila =

Scientific classification
- Domain: Bacteria
- Kingdom: Pseudomonadati
- Phylum: Pseudomonadota
- Class: Alphaproteobacteria
- Order: Hyphomicrobiales
- Family: Methylobacteriaceae
- Genus: Microvirga
- Species: M. aerophila

Binomial name
- Microvirga aerophila Weon et al. 2010

Type strain
- KACC 12743, 5420S-12, NBRC 106136

Synonyms
- Microvirga aerophilus

Species of bacterium

Microvirga aerophila is a bacterium from the genus Microvirga which has been isolated from air in Suwon in Korea.
