= Mesorhizobium shonense =

Scientific classification
- Domain: Bacteria
- Kingdom: Pseudomonadati
- Phylum: Pseudomonadota
- Class: Alphaproteobacteria
- Order: Hyphomicrobiales
- Family: Phyllobacteriaceae
- Genus: Mesorhizobium
- Species: M. shonense

Binomial name
- Mesorhizobium shonense Degefu et al. 2013

Type strain
- AC39a, HAMBI 3295, LMG 26966

Species of bacterium

Mesorhizobium shonense is a bacterium from the genus Mesorhizobium which was isolated in southern Ethiopia.
