= Neorhizobium =

Scientific classification
- Domain: Bacteria
- Kingdom: Pseudomonadati
- Phylum: Pseudomonadota
- Class: Alphaproteobacteria
- Order: Hyphomicrobiales
- Family: Rhizobiaceae
- Genus: Neorhizobium; Mousavi et al. 2014

Type species
- Neorhizobium galegae Lindström 1989

Species
- Neorhizobium alkalisoli (Lu et al. 2009) Mousavi et al. 2015; Neorhizobium galegae (Lindström 1989) Mousavi et al. 2015; Neorhizobium huautlense (Wang et al. 1998) Mousavi et al. 2015; "Neorhizobium lilium" Liu et al. 2020; Neorhizobium petrolearium (Zhang et al. 2012) Kuzmanović et al. 2022; Neorhizobium tomejilense Soenens et al. 2020; Neorhizobium vignae (Ren et al. 2011) Hördt et al. 2020

Genus of bacteria

Neorhizobium is a genus of Gram-negative soil bacteria that fix nitrogen. It was recently segregated from the genus Rhizobium. Neorhizobium forms an endosymbiotic nitrogen-fixing association with roots of legumes.
