= Microvirga zambiensis =

Scientific classification
- Domain: Bacteria
- Kingdom: Pseudomonadati
- Phylum: Pseudomonadota
- Class: Alphaproteobacteria
- Order: Hyphomicrobiales
- Family: Methylobacteriaceae
- Genus: Microvirga
- Species: M. zambiensis

Binomial name
- Microvirga zambiensis Ardley et al. 2012

Type strain
- CB 1298, HAMBI 3238, LMG 26454, Willems R-41059, WSM3693

Species of bacterium

Microvirga zambiensis is a Gram-negative, nitrogen-fixing, rod-shaped and non-spore-forming bacteria from the genus Microvirga.
