= Microvirga lupini =

Scientific classification
- Domain: Bacteria
- Kingdom: Pseudomonadati
- Phylum: Pseudomonadota
- Class: Alphaproteobacteria
- Order: Hyphomicrobiales
- Family: Methylobacteriaceae
- Genus: Microvirga
- Species: M. lupini

Binomial name
- Microvirga lupini Ardley et al. 2012

Type strain
- HAMBI 3236, LMG 26460, Lut6, Willems R-41057

Synonyms Rhizobiales bacterium
- Microvirga texensis

Species of bacterium

Microvirga lupini is a nitrogen-fixing, Gram-negative, aerobic rod-shaped and non-spore-forming bacteria from the genus Microvirga.
