= Ensifer fredii =

Scientific classification
- Domain: Bacteria
- Kingdom: Pseudomonadati
- Phylum: Pseudomonadota
- Class: Alphaproteobacteria
- Order: Hyphomicrobiales
- Family: Rhizobiaceae
- Genus: Ensifer
- Species: E. fredii

Binomial name
- Ensifer fredii (Scholla & Elkan, 1984) Young, 2003

Synonyms
- Ensifer xinjiangensis (Chen et al., 1988) Young, 2003; Rhizobium fredii Scholla and Elkan, 1984; Sinorhizobium fredii (Scholla and Elkan, 1984) Chen et al., 1988 emend. De Lajudie et al., 1994; Sinorhizobium xinjiangense Chen et al., 1988

Species of bacterium

Ensifer fredii is a nitrogen fixing bacterium. It is a fast-growing root nodule bacterium. Ensifer fredii exhibits a broad host-range and is able to nodulate both determinant hosts, such as soy, as well as indeterminate hosts including the pigeon pea. Because of their ease of host infection there is interest in their genetics and the symbiotic role in host infection and nodule formation.

== History ==
Ensifer fredii was first isolated from soybeans. The type strain was isolated from a root nodule of Glycine max growing in Hunan Province, China, designated strain USDA 205 (= ATCC 35423 = PRC 205).
