= Mesorhizobium alhagi =

Scientific classification
- Domain: Bacteria
- Kingdom: Pseudomonadati
- Phylum: Pseudomonadota
- Class: Alphaproteobacteria
- Order: Hyphomicrobiales
- Family: Phyllobacteriaceae
- Genus: Mesorhizobium
- Species: M. alhagi

Binomial name
- Mesorhizobium alhagi Chen et al. 2010

Type strain
- ACCC 15461, CCNWXJ12-2, HAMBI 3019

Species of bacterium

Mesorhizobium alhagi is a gram-negative, aerobic non-spore-forming, motile bacteria from the genus of Mesorhizobium which was isolated from wild Alhagi sparsifolia in north-western China.
