= Pararhizobium giardinii =

Scientific classification
- Domain: Bacteria
- Kingdom: Pseudomonadati
- Phylum: Pseudomonadota
- Class: Alphaproteobacteria
- Order: Hyphomicrobiales
- Family: Rhizobiaceae
- Genus: Pararhizobium
- Species: P. giardinii

Binomial name
- Pararhizobium giardinii (Amarger et al. 1997) Mousavi et al. 2015

Biovars
- symbiovar giardinii; symbiovar phaseoli

Synonyms
- Rhizobium giardinii Amarger et al. 1997

Species of bacterium

Pararhizobium giardinii is a Gram negative root nodule bacteria. It forms nitrogen-fixing root nodules on legumes, being first isolated from those of Phaseolus vulgaris.
