= Mesorhizobium albiziae =

Scientific classification
- Domain: Bacteria
- Kingdom: Pseudomonadati
- Phylum: Pseudomonadota
- Class: Alphaproteobacteria
- Order: Hyphomicrobiales
- Family: Phyllobacteriaceae
- Genus: Mesorhizobium
- Species: M. albiziae

Binomial name
- Mesorhizobium albiziae Wang et al. 2007

Type strain
- CCBAU 61158, LMG 23507, USDA 4964

Species of bacterium

Mesorhizobium albiziae is a bacterium from the genus of Mesorhizobium which was isolated from a subtropical region in China.
