= Ensifer americanus =

Scientific classification
- Domain: Bacteria
- Kingdom: Pseudomonadati
- Phylum: Pseudomonadota
- Class: Alphaproteobacteria
- Order: Hyphomicrobiales
- Family: Rhizobiaceae
- Genus: Ensifer
- Species: E. americanus

Binomial name
- Ensifer americanus (Toledo et al. 2004) Wang et al. 2015

Synonyms
- Sinorhizobium americanum Toledo et al., 2004

Species of bacterium

Ensifer americanus is a bacterium first isolated from root nodules of Acacia species native of Mexico. Its type strain is CFNEI 156.
