= Mesorhizobium caraganae =

Scientific classification
- Domain: Bacteria
- Kingdom: Pseudomonadati
- Phylum: Pseudomonadota
- Class: Alphaproteobacteria
- Order: Hyphomicrobiales
- Family: Phyllobacteriaceae
- Genus: Mesorhizobium
- Species: M. caraganae

Binomial name
- Mesorhizobium caraganae Guan et al. 2008

Type strain
- CCBAU 11299, HAMBI 2990, LMG 24397

Species of bacterium

Mesorhizobium caraganae is a gram-negative, aerobic, non-spore-forming, motile bacteria from the genus of Mesorhizobium which was isolated from root nodules of Caragana microphyllain in the Beipiao City in the Liaoning Province in China.
