= Mesorhizobium ciceri =

Scientific classification
- Domain: Bacteria
- Kingdom: Pseudomonadati
- Phylum: Pseudomonadota
- Class: Alphaproteobacteria
- Order: Hyphomicrobiales
- Family: Phyllobacteriaceae
- Genus: Mesorhizobium
- Species: M. ciceri

Binomial name
- Mesorhizobium ciceri Jarvis et al. 1997

Type strain
- ATCC 51585, ATCC 700744, BCRC 15795, CCRC 15795, CECT 4846, CFBP 5557, CIP 104229, DSMZ 11540, HAMBI 1750, IAM 15103, ICMP 13641, JCM 21564, KACC 10646, KCTC 12155, LMG 14989, LMG 17150, NBRC 100389, ORS 2738, UPM-Ca7, USDA 3383

Synonyms
- Rhizobium ciceri

Species of bacterium

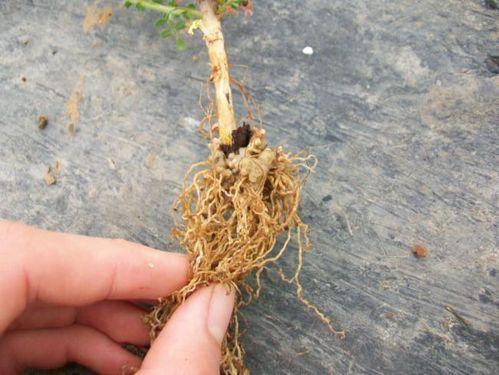
Mesorhizobium ciceri

Mesorhizobium ciceri is a gram-negative, nitrogen-fixing motile bacteria from the genus of Mesorhizobium which was isolated from Chickpea nodules of Cicer arietinum in Spain. Rhizobium cicero was transferred to Mesorhizobium ciceri.
