= Neorhizobium huautlense =

Scientific classification
- Domain: Bacteria
- Kingdom: Pseudomonadati
- Phylum: Pseudomonadota
- Class: Alphaproteobacteria
- Order: Hyphomicrobiales
- Family: Rhizobiaceae
- Genus: Neorhizobium
- Species: N. huautlense

Binomial name
- Neorhizobium huautlense (Wang et al. 1998) Mousavi et al. 2015

Synonyms
- Rhizobium huautlense Wang et al. 1998

Species of bacterium

Neorhizobium huautlense is a Gram negative root nodule bacterium. It forms nitrogen-fixing root nodules on Sesbania herbacea.
