= Microvirga lotononidis =

Scientific classification
- Domain: Bacteria
- Kingdom: Pseudomonadati
- Phylum: Pseudomonadota
- Class: Alphaproteobacteria
- Order: Hyphomicrobiales
- Family: Methylobacteriaceae
- Genus: Microvirga
- Species: M. lotononidis

Binomial name
- Microvirga lotononidis Ardley et al. 2012

Type strain
- CB 1322, HAMBI 3237, LMG 26455, Willems R-41058, WSM3557

Synonyms
- Microvirga lotononensis

Species of bacterium

Microvirga lotononidis is a nitrogen fixing, Gram-negative, rod-shaped and non-spore-forming root-nodule bacteria from the genus Microvirga. Microvirga lotononidis lives in symbiosis with Listia angolensis.
