= Mesorhizobium tamadayense =

Scientific classification
- Domain: Bacteria
- Kingdom: Pseudomonadati
- Phylum: Pseudomonadota
- Class: Alphaproteobacteria
- Order: Hyphomicrobiales
- Family: Phyllobacteriaceae
- Genus: Mesorhizobium
- Species: M. tamadayense

Binomial name
- Mesorhizobium tamadayense Ramírez-Bahena et al. 2012

Type strain
- Ala-3, CECT 8040, LMG 26736

Species of bacterium

Mesorhizobium tamadayense is a bacterium from the genus Mesorhizobium.
