= Mesorhizobium opportunistum =

Scientific classification
- Domain: Bacteria
- Kingdom: Pseudomonadati
- Phylum: Pseudomonadota
- Class: Alphaproteobacteria
- Order: Hyphomicrobiales
- Family: Phyllobacteriaceae
- Genus: Mesorhizobium
- Species: M. opportunistum

Binomial name
- Mesorhizobium opportunistum Nandasena et al. 2009

Type strain
- HAMBI 3007, LMG 24607, Nandasena N45, Willems R-34167, WSM2075

Species of bacterium

Mesorhizobium opportunistum is a bacterium from the genus Mesorhizobium which was isolated from Biserrula pelecinus in Australia.
