= Mesorhizobium amorphae =

Scientific classification
- Domain: Bacteria
- Kingdom: Pseudomonadati
- Phylum: Pseudomonadota
- Class: Alphaproteobacteria
- Order: Hyphomicrobiales
- Family: Phyllobacteriaceae
- Genus: Mesorhizobium
- Species: M. amorphae

Binomial name
- Mesorhizobium amorphae Wang et al. 1999

Species of bacterium

Mesorhizobium amorphae is a species of root nodule bacteria first isolated from Amorpha fruticosa species in China. It is purported to be native to American soil. Its genome has been sequenced. Its type strain is ACCC 19665.
