= Phyllobacterium =

Scientific classification
- Domain: Bacteria
- Kingdom: Pseudomonadati
- Phylum: Pseudomonadota
- Class: Alphaproteobacteria
- Order: Hyphomicrobiales
- Family: Phyllobacteriaceae
- Genus: Phyllobacterium; Knösel 1984

Type species
- Phyllobacterium myrsinacearum

Species
- P. bourgognense Mantelin et al. 2006; P. brassicacearum Mantelin et al. 2006; P. catacumbae Jurado et al. 2005; P. endophyticum Flores-Félix et al. 2013; P. ifriqiyense Mantelin et al. 2006; P. leguminum Mantelin et al. 2006; P. loti Sánchez et al. 2014; P. myrsinacearum (ex Knösel 1962) Knösel 1984; "Phyllobacterium pellucidum" Park et al. 2021; "Phyllobacterium phragmitis" Liang et al. 2019; P. salinisoli León-Barrios et al. 2018; P. sophorae Jiao et al. 2015; P. trifolii Valverde et al. 2005; P. zundukense Safronova et al. 2018

Genus of bacteria

Phyllobacterium (plural: phyllobacteria) is a genus of Gram-negative, oxidase- and catalase-positive, aerobic bacteria.

== Phylogeny ==
The currently accepted taxonomy is based on the List of Prokaryotic names with Standing in Nomenclature (LPSN). The phylogeny is based on whole-genome analysis.

- - Phyllobacterium
    - - Phyllobacterium salinisoli
      - Phyllobacterium leguminum
    - - Phyllobacterium myrsinacearum
      - - Phyllobacterium endophyticum
        - - Phyllobacterium sophorae
          - - Phyllobacterium brassicacearum
            - - Phyllobacterium zundukense
              - - Phyllobacterium bourgognense
                - - - Phyllobacterium loti
                    - Phyllobacterium trifolii
                  - - Phyllobacterium catacumbae
                    - Phyllobacterium ifriqiyense
  - outgroup
    Brucellaceae
