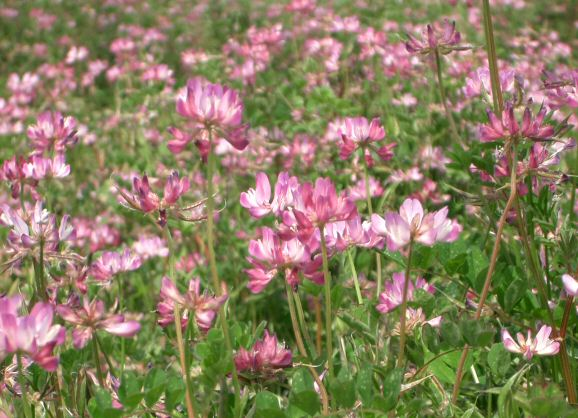

Scientific classification
- Kingdom: Plantae
- Clade: Tracheophytes
- Clade: Angiosperms
- Clade: Eudicots
- Clade: Rosids
- Order: Fabales
- Family: Fabaceae
- Subfamily: Faboideae
- Genus: Astragalus
- Species: A. sinicus

Binomial name
- Astragalus sinicus L.

Synonyms
- Astragalus lotoides Lam.; Astragalus sinicus Thunb.; Tragacantha sinica (L.) Kuntze

= Astragalus sinicus =

Species of legume

Astragalus sinicus is a species of milkvetch in the family Fabaceae. It is known under such common names as Chinese milkvetch (or milk-vetch), renge or genge and is in common use in farming as a green manure. It is not to be confused with Astragalus mongholicus, the plant yielding Radix Astragali for Chinese medicine.
