= Argyrolobium uniflorum =

Scientific classification
- Kingdom: Plantae
- Clade: Tracheophytes
- Clade: Angiosperms
- Clade: Eudicots
- Clade: Rosids
- Order: Fabales
- Family: Fabaceae
- Subfamily: Faboideae
- Genus: Argyrolobium
- Species: A. uniflorum

Binomial name
- Argyrolobium uniflorum (Decne.) Jaub. & Spach

Synonyms
- Cytisus uniflorus Decne. Genista uniflora (Decne.) Briq. Genista africana Briq.

Species of plant

Argyrolobium uniflorum is a wild pluriannual herbaceous species of drought tolerant legume found in arid regions of Northern Africa sometimes described as pseudo-savannah. A. uniflorum is a hardy wild species of plant and it is considered a valuable forage crop for agriculture in Africa. It is also useful as a potentially important species in bioremediation and dryland restoration in arid regions of Tusinia which are sensitive to misappropriation and overgrazing.

== Morphology ==
Argyrolobium uniflorum has been described as a dwarf flowering shrub with stems 10-18 inches long, with infolded leaflets, solitary flowers opposite the leaf.

== Distribution ==
Argyrolobium uniflorum is found in South Africa along the Berg River and on the Vanstaadensberg mountain range and uncommonly in Albany Africa. Recent examples of the species in Europe in South Eastern Spain and are considered an emerging plant in these areas.

== Symbiosis ==
Argyrolobium uniflorum is a symbiosis competent legume. It is capable of nodule formation and nitrogen fixing symbiosis with species of alphaproteobacteria.
