= Mesorhizobium metallidurans =

Scientific classification
- Domain: Bacteria
- Kingdom: Pseudomonadati
- Phylum: Pseudomonadota
- Class: Alphaproteobacteria
- Order: Hyphomicrobiales
- Family: Phyllobacteriaceae
- Genus: Mesorhizobium
- Species: M. metallidurans

Binomial name
- Mesorhizobium metallidurans Vidal et al. 2009

Type strain
- CFBP 7147, LMG 24485, STM 2683

Species of bacterium

Mesorhizobium metallidurans is a gram-negative, aerobic, non-spore-forming bacteria from the genus Mesorhizobium which was isolated from root nodules of Anthyllis vulneraria in the spoil heaps from the heavy metal enriched Laurent le Minier located in the Languedoc in France.
