= Neorhizobium galegae =

Scientific classification
- Domain: Bacteria
- Kingdom: Pseudomonadati
- Phylum: Pseudomonadota
- Class: Alphaproteobacteria
- Order: Hyphomicrobiales
- Family: Rhizobiaceae
- Genus: Neorhizobium
- Species: N. galegae

Binomial name
- Neorhizobium galegae (Lindström 1989) Mousavi et al. 2015

Symbiovars
- N. g. sv. officinalis; N. g. sv. orientalis

Synonyms
- Rhizobium galegae Lindström 1989

Species of bacterium

Neorhizobium galegae is a Gram negative root nodule bacteria. It forms nitrogen-fixing root nodules on legumes in the genus Galega.
