= Pararhizobium =

Scientific classification
- Domain: Bacteria
- Kingdom: Pseudomonadati
- Phylum: Pseudomonadota
- Class: Alphaproteobacteria
- Order: Hyphomicrobiales
- Family: Rhizobiaceae
- Genus: Pararhizobium; Mousavi et al. 2016

Type species
- Pararhizobium giardinii (Amarger et al. 1997) Mousavi et al. 2016

Species
- Pararhizobium antarcticum Naqvi et al. 2017; Pararhizobium arenae (Zhang et al. 2017) Kuzmanović et al. 2022; Pararhizobium capsulatum (Hirsch and Müller 1986) Mousavi et al. 2016; Pararhizobium giardinii (Amarger et al. 1997) Mousavi et al. 2016; "Pararhizobium helanshanense" (Qin et al. 2012) Mousavi et al. 2015; Pararhizobium herbae (Ren et al. 2011) Mousavi et al. 2016; "Pararhizobium mangrovi" Li et al. 2021; Pararhizobium polonicum Puławska et al. 2017; "Pararhizobium sphaerophysae" (Xu et al. 2012) Mousavi et al. 2015

Genus of bacteria

Pararhizobium is a genus of Gram-negative soil bacteria that fix nitrogen. Some species of Pararhizobium form an endosymbiotic nitrogen-fixing association with roots of legumes.
