= Mesorhizobium loti =

Scientific classification
- Domain: Bacteria
- Kingdom: Pseudomonadati
- Phylum: Pseudomonadota
- Class: Alphaproteobacteria
- Order: Hyphomicrobiales
- Family: Phyllobacteriaceae
- Genus: Mesorhizobium
- Species: M. loti

Binomial name
- Mesorhizobium loti (Jarvis et al. 1982) Jarvis et al. 1997

Species of bacterium

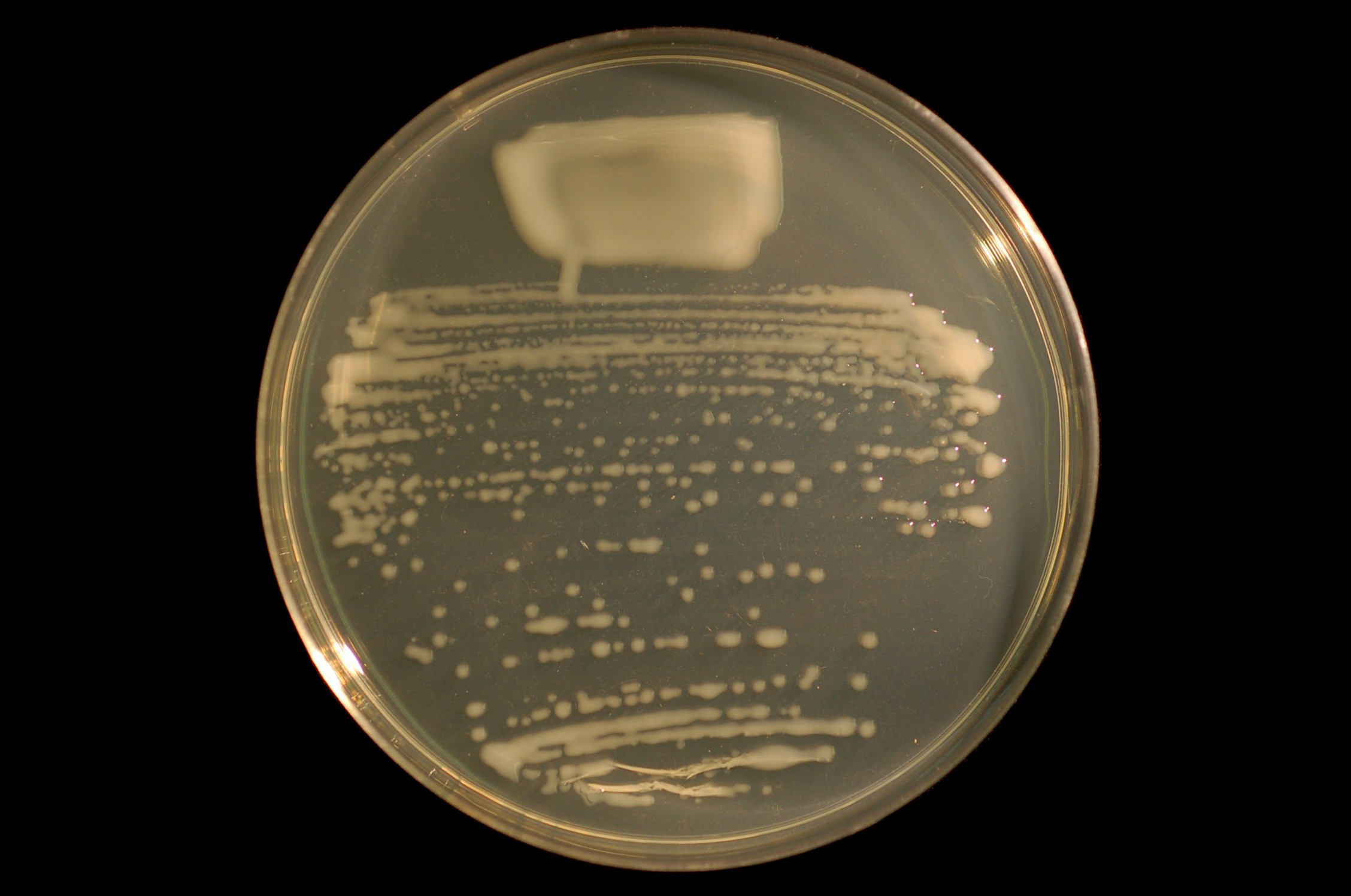
Mesorhizobium loti strain

Mesorhizobium loti, formerly known as Rhizobium loti, is a Gram negative species of bacteria found in the root nodules of many plant species. Its name is a reference to Lotus corniculatus, a flowering plant from which it was originally isolated.

== Genetics ==
The complete genome sequence of a strain of M. loti was determined in 2000.

Unusually, M. loti has two Ku genes (mlr9624 and mlr9623) instead of the usual one in each bacterial species. (Ku is involved in NHEJ repair.)

== See also ==
- Rhizobium galegae
