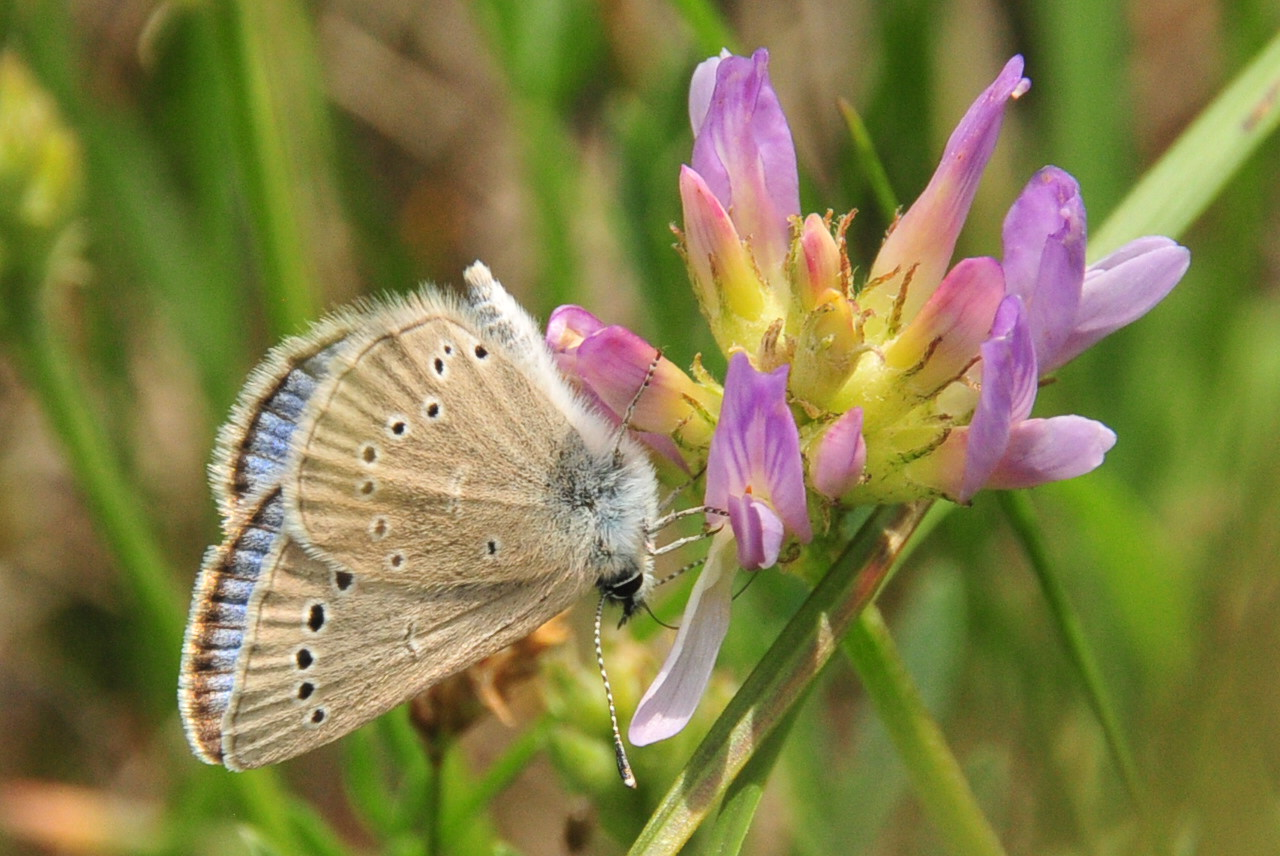
- A silvery blue feeding on flowers in the Sand Lake Wetland Management District
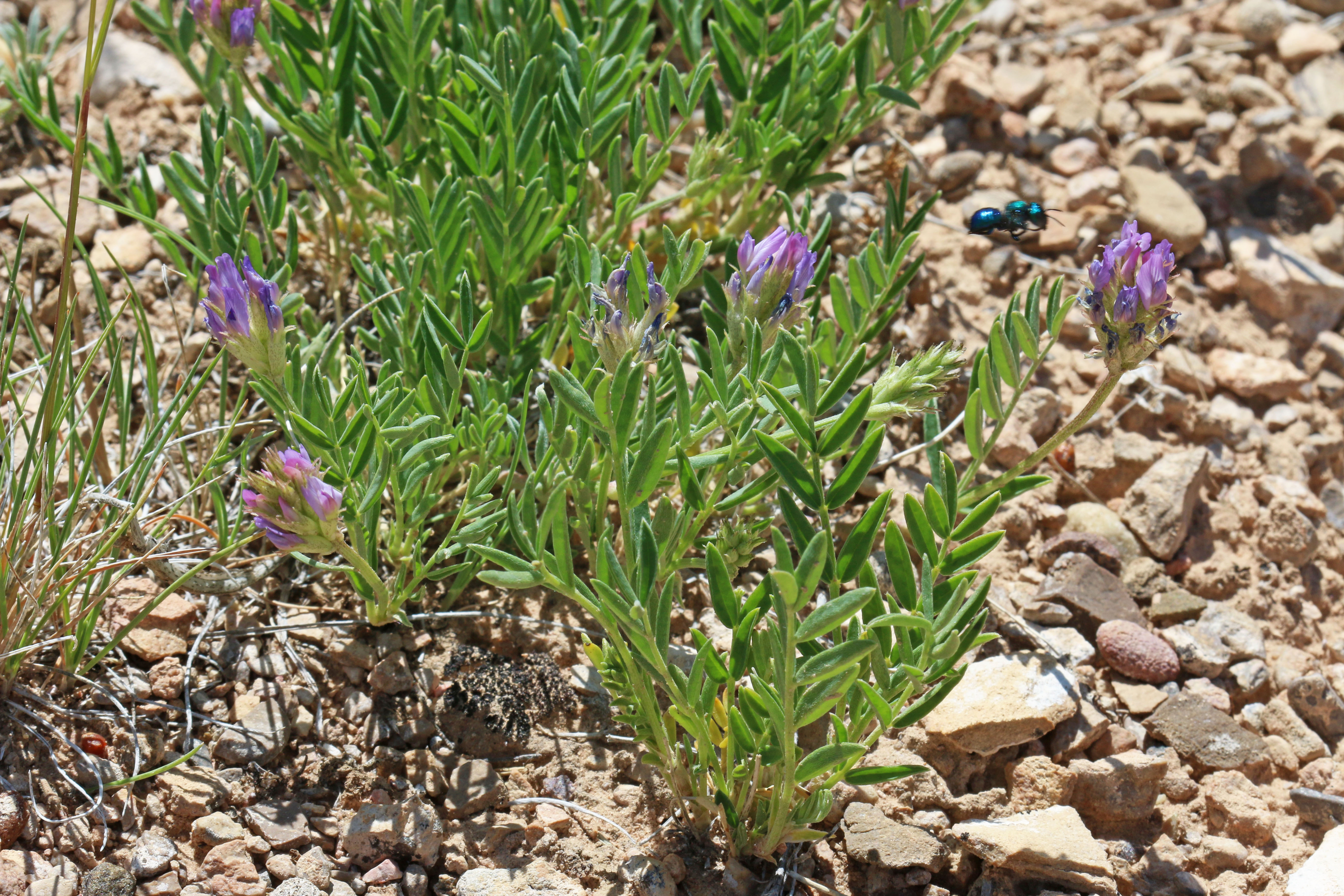
- In Wyoming

Scientific classification
- Kingdom: Plantae
- Clade: Tracheophytes
- Clade: Angiosperms
- Clade: Eudicots
- Clade: Rosids
- Order: Fabales
- Family: Fabaceae
- Subfamily: Faboideae
- Genus: Astragalus
- Species: A. laxmannii

Binomial name
- Astragalus laxmannii Jacq.

Synonyms
- List: Astragalus adsurgens Pall.; Astragalus adsurgens var. albifolius Blank.; Astragalus adsurgens f. chandonnetii (Lundell) B.Boivin; Astragalus adsurgens var. fujisanensis (Miyabe & Tatew.) Kitag.; Astragalus adsurgens var. laxmannii (Jacq.) Trautv.; Astragalus adsurgens f. leucantha Takeda; Astragalus adsurgens subsp. oreogenus (Jurtzev) Vorosch.; Astragalus adsurgens var. paucijugus E.Peter; Astragalus adsurgens var. pauperculus Blank.; Astragalus adsurgens var. prostratus DC.; Astragalus adsurgens subsp. robustior (Hook.) S.L.Welsh; Astragalus adsurgens var. robustior Hook.; Astragalus adsurgens var. tananaicus (Hultén) Barneby; Astragalus adsurgens subsp. viciifolius S.L.Welsh; Astragalus austrosibiricus Schischk.; Astragalus chandonnetii Lundell; Astragalus crandallii Gand.; Astragalus fujisanensis Miyabe & Tatew.; Astragalus gmelinii Scop.; Astragalus inopinatus Boriss.; Astragalus inopinatus subsp. fujisanensis (Miyabe & Tatew.) Kitag.; Astragalus inopinatus subsp. oreogenus Jurtzev; Astragalus inopinatus subsp. substepposus Jurtzev; Astragalus karoi Freyn; Astragalus laxmannii Nutt.; Astragalus laxmannii var. adsurgens (Pall.) Kitag.; Astragalus laxmannii subsp. fujisanensis (Miyabe & Tatew.) Kitag.; Astragalus laxmannii var. robustior (Hook.) Barneby & S.L.Welsh; Astragalus laxmannii var. tananaicus (Hultén) Barneby & S.L.Welsh; Astragalus longispicatus Ulbr.; Astragalus marianus C.Huber; Astragalus microphyllus Georgi; Astragalus nitidus Douglas ex Hook.; Astragalus nitidus var. robustior (Hook.) M.E.Jones; Astragalus oostachys E.Peter; Astragalus oreogenus (Jurtzev) Knjaz.; Astragalus prostratus Fisch. ex Turcz.; Astragalus semibilocularis Fisch. ex Bunge; Astragalus semibilocularis DC.; Astragalus striatus Nutt.; Astragalus sulphurescens Rydb.; Astragalus sulphurescens var. pinicola E.H.Kelso; Astragalus syriacus Pall. ex Ledeb.; Astragalus tananaicus Hultén; Astragalus viciifolius Hultén; Phaca adsurgens (Pall.) Piper; Phaca laxmannii (Jacq.) Medik.; Solenotus adsurgens (Pall.) Steven; Tragacantha adsurgens (Pall.) Kuntze; Tragacantha laxmannii (Jacq.) Kuntze; Tragacantha semibilocularis Kuntze

= Astragalus laxmannii =

Species of plant

Astragalus laxmannii, the standing milkvetch, Tanana milkvetch, or Laxmann's milkvetch, is a species of flowering plant in the family Fabaceae. It is native to Kazakhstan, Siberia, Mongolia, China, Korea, Japan (where it is called ムラサキモメンヅル (murasaki momenjiru - lit. purple cotton vine)), Canada, and the northwestern and north-central United States. A perennial reaching 16 in (41 cm), it is typically found in dry soils with little organic content in otherwise wetter areas. Asian populations were previously considered to be a separate species, Astragalus adsurgens Pall..

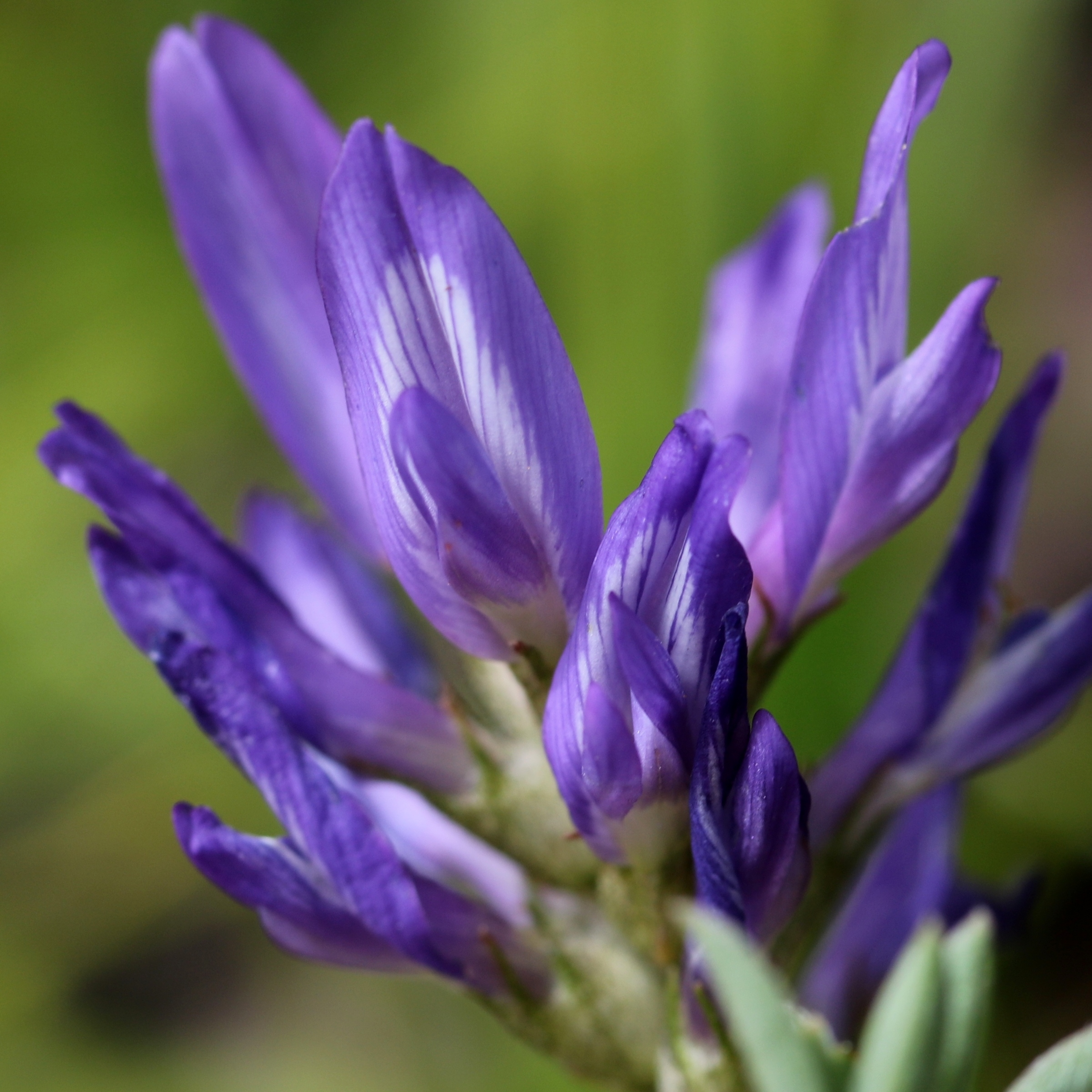
Close-up of flowers

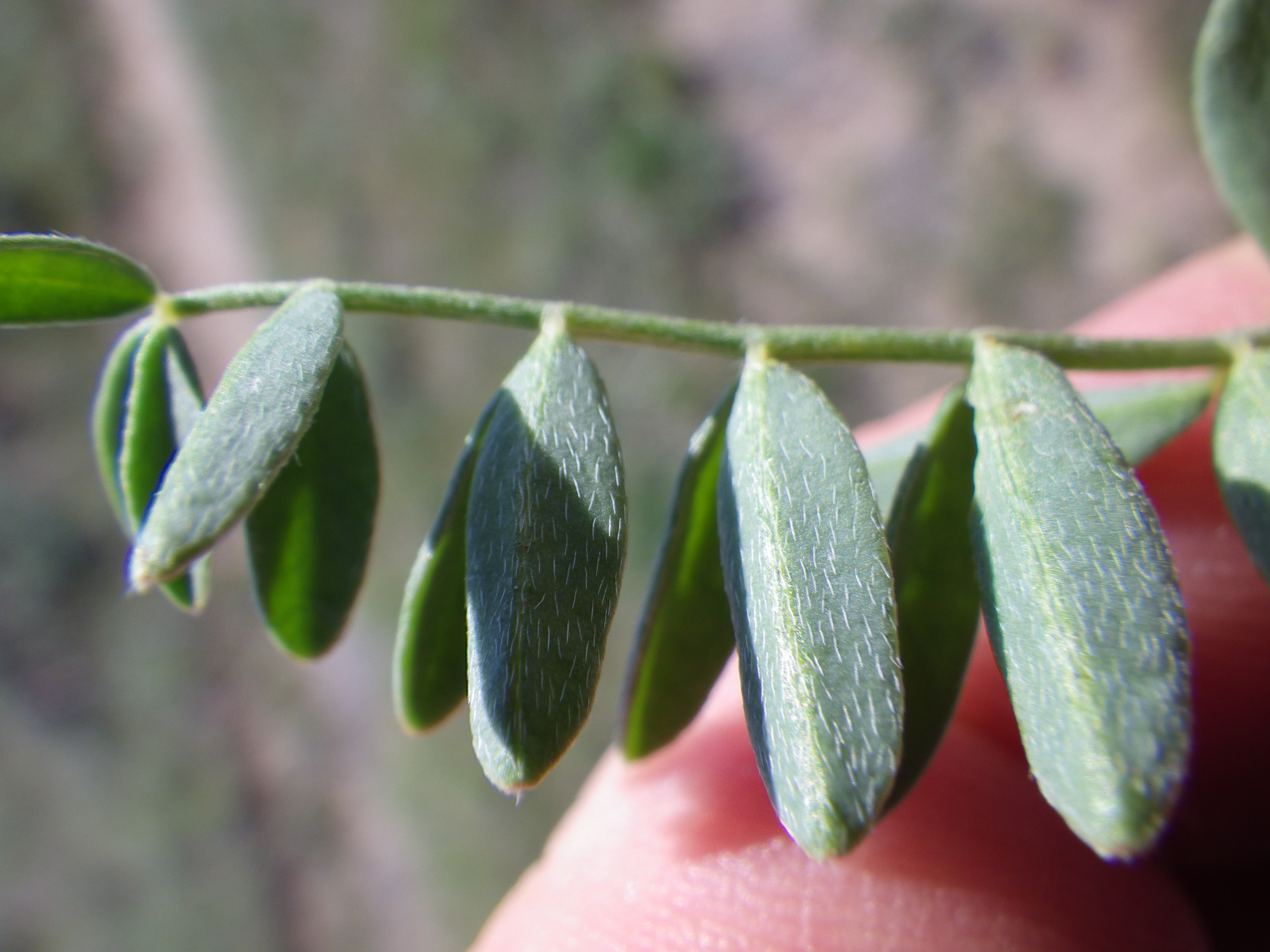
Undersides of leaflets

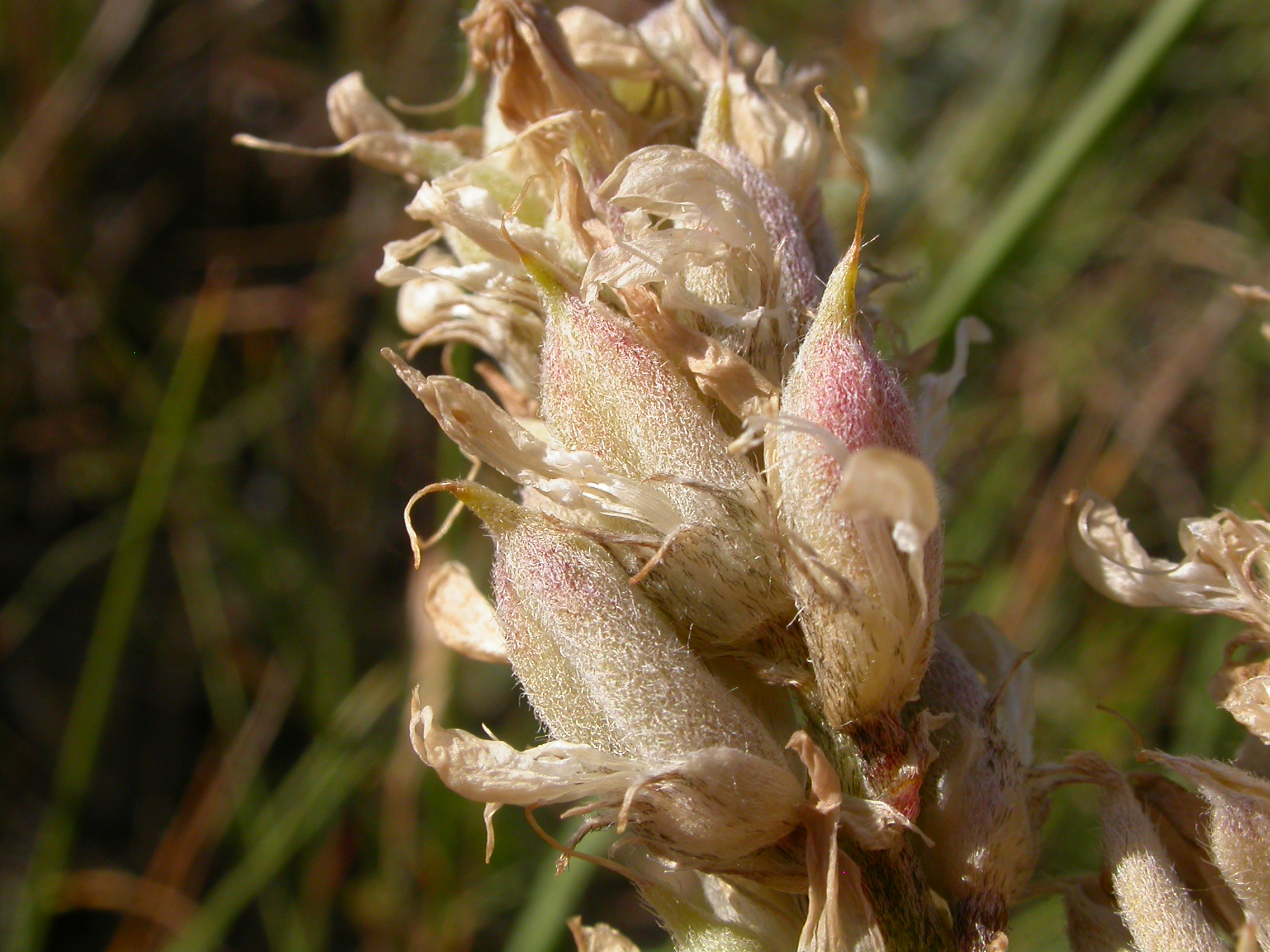
Pods

== Subtaxa ==
The following subspecies are accepted:

- Astragalus laxmannii subsp. laxmannii – Kazakhstan, Siberia, the Russian Far East (except Sakhalin, the Kurils, and Kamchatka), Mongolia, China, Korea, Japan
- Astragalus laxmannii subsp. robustior (Hook.) Podlech – Canada (but not Nunavut or east of Ontario), northwestern and north-central USA (but not Kansas, Oklahoma, Wisconsin, Illinois, or Missouri), and Utah and New Mexico
- Astragalus laxmannii subsp. viciifolius (S.L.Welsh) Podlech – east-central Alaska, southern Yukon
