= Fenestrelle Fort =

Fort in Fenestrelle, Italy

Coordinates: 45°01′47″N 7°03′38″E

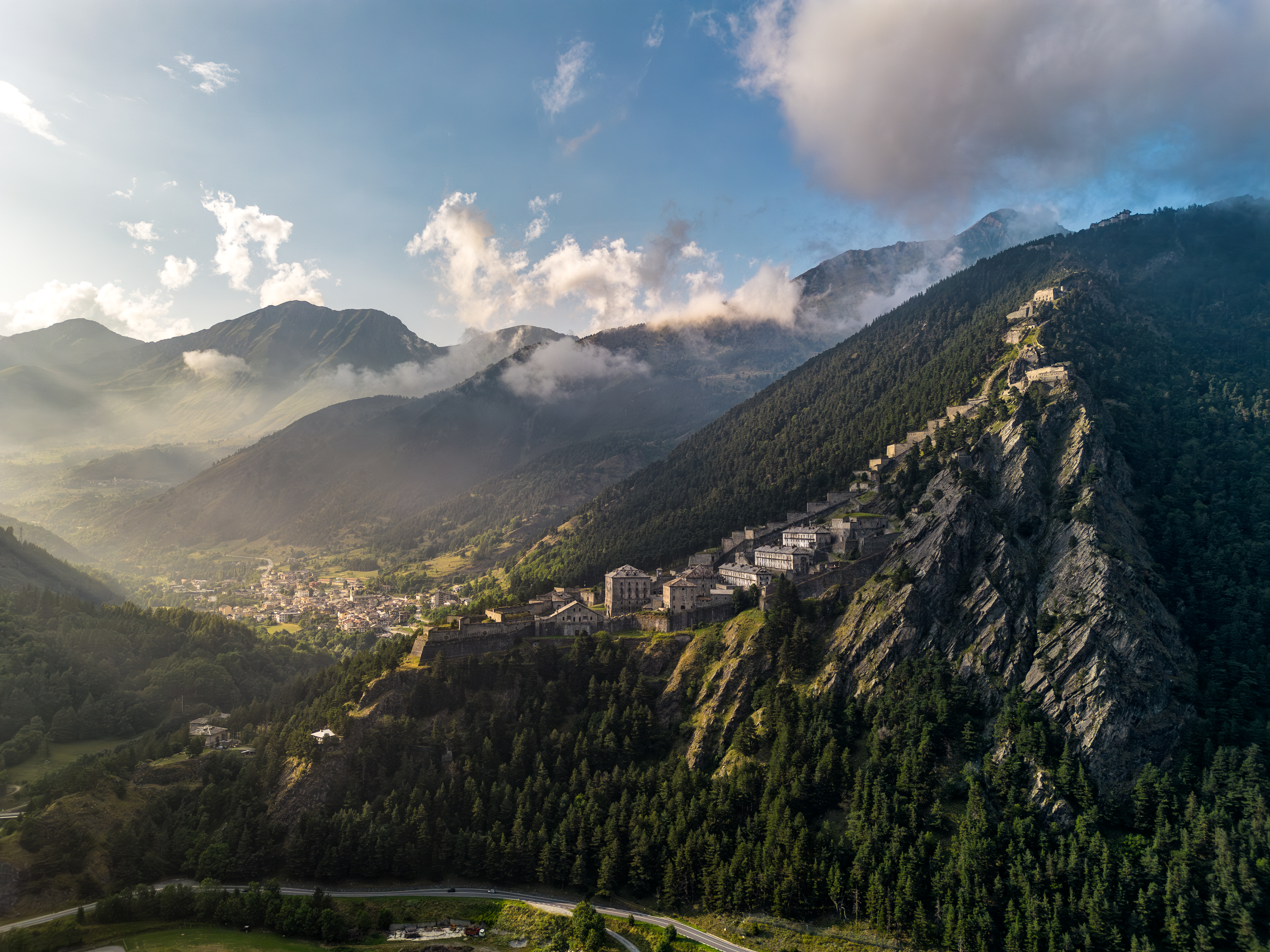
Fenestrelle Fort in 2024

The Fenestrelle Fortress, better known as the Fenestrelle Fort is a fortress overlooking Fenestrelle. It is the symbol of the Metropolitan City of Turin, Piedmont, northern Italy. It is the biggest alpine fortification in Europe, having a surface area of 130 hectares (320 acres). The fortress, built by Savoy between 1728 and 1850 under the design of the architect Ignazio Bertola, guards the access to Turin via the Chisone valley and stands at altitudes between 1,100 and 1,800 m. The territory was acquired in 1709 by the Duchy of Savoy (later known as the Kingdom of Sardinia) after the defeat of the French at Fort Mutin (Fenestrelle).

== History ==
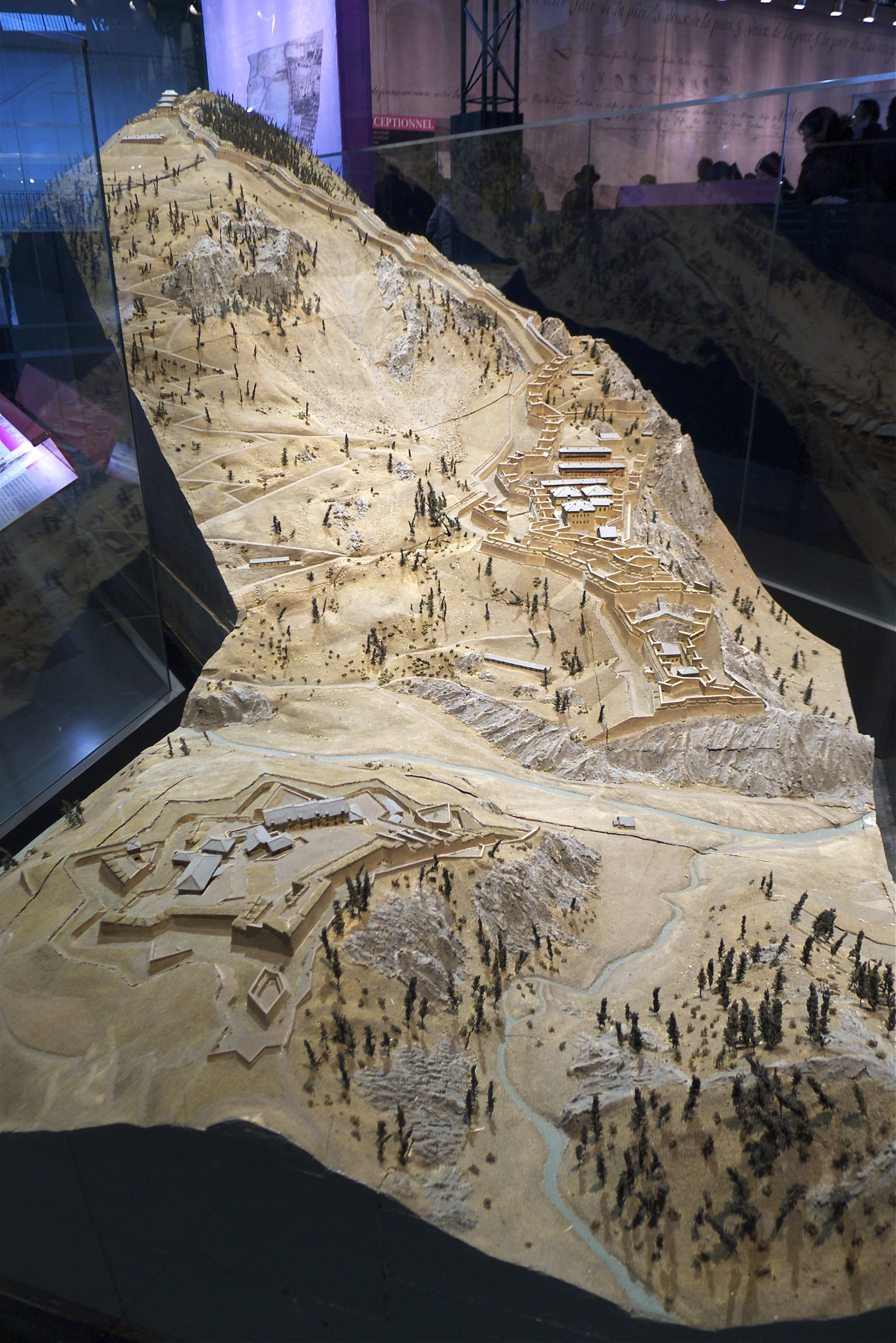
Model of Fenestrelle Fort

The history of modern fortifications in the Fenestrelle area, began in 1690, when King Louis XIV appointed Nicolas Catinat as commander of the French Army against Victor Amadeus II, the Duke of Savoy’s Army during the Nine Years' War. General Catinat, better known in Piedmont for his victory at the Battle of Staffarda, the destruction of the Castle of Avigliana and the fire at the Castle of Rivoli, understood the danger posed by the Chisone Valley (Val Chisone) for the French Army and decided to build 3 small redoubts and a fort in the Fenestrelle area.

More specifically, in 1694 Nicolas Catinat obtained Louis' approval to build Fort Mutin. During the War of the Spanish Succession, this imposing fortification was besieged in August 1708 by Victor Amadeus’ troops and conquered in 15 days.

At the end of the War of the Spanish Succession, France officially ceded Fenestrelle and the upper Val Chisone to the Duchy of Savoy as required by the Treaty of Utrecht in 1713. The treaty gave the Kingdom of Sicily to the Duchy of Savoy, making Victor Amadeus II the first king of the House of Savoy. For political reasons the Kingdom of Sicily was then exchanged with the Kingdom of Sardinia in 1720.

Fort Mutin was restored, but Victor Amadeus II found it insufficient for the protection of the Val Chisone. So he instructed military architect Ignazio Bertola to design and build a complex of forts in Fenestrelle. They were connected by a 3 km long wall, an indoor staircase of 3,996 steps unique in Europe and an outside staircase of 2,500 steps. The construction began in the summer of 1728 and ended in 1793; then it started again in 1836, ending definitively in 1850. Besides Ignazio Bertola, other engineers and military architects worked at Fenestrelle; among them: Vittorio Amedeo Varino de La Marche, Lorenzo Bernardino Pinto (who was one of Bertola’s apprentices and also worked at the Fort of Exilles), Nicolis di Robilant and Carlo Andrea Rana.

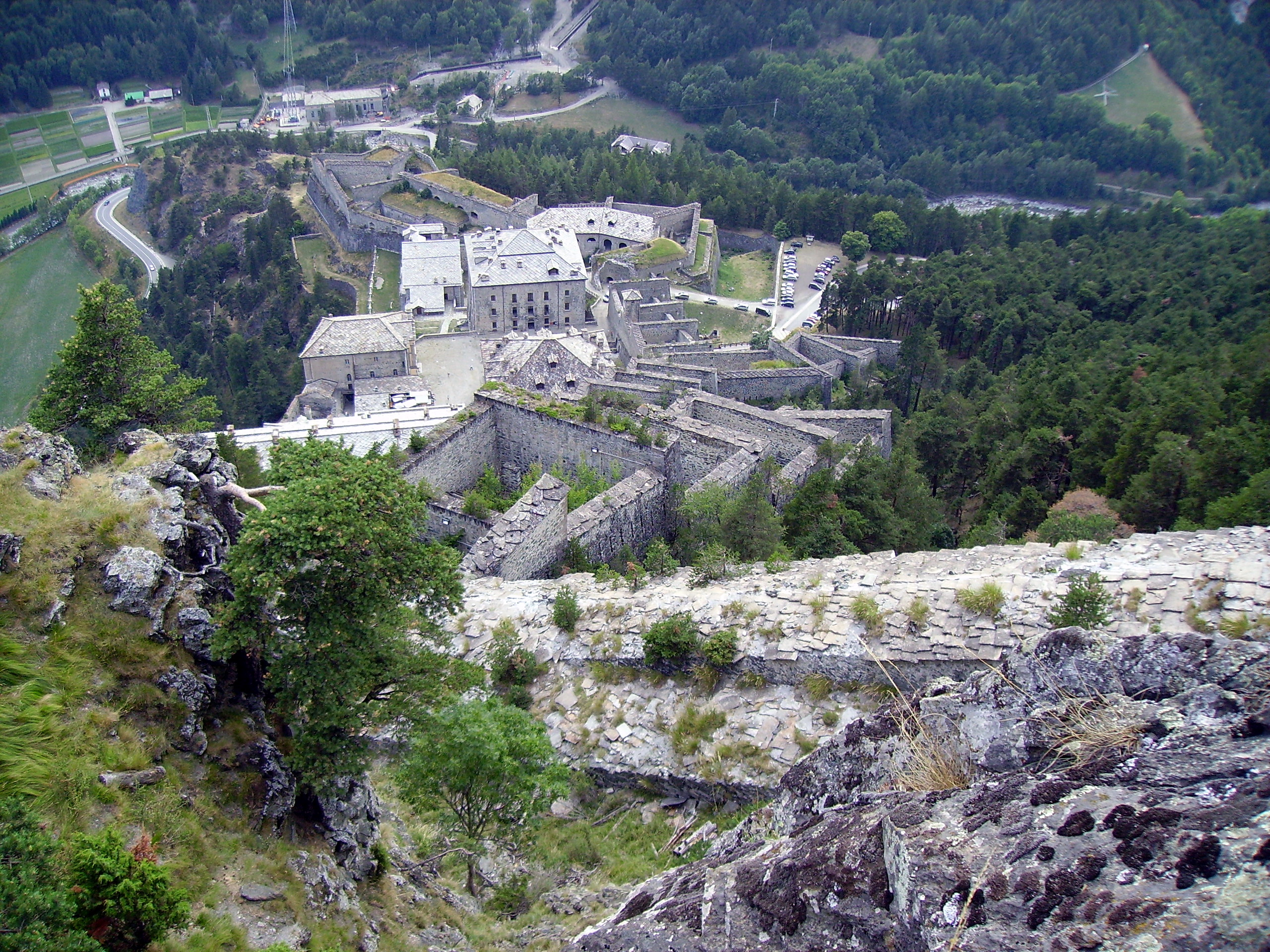
View from the top downward

During the Napoleonic Era when Fenestrelle was again under the French influence, it was used as a prison by the French Empire: notable prisoners were Joseph de Maistre and Bartolomeo Pacca. The prison also held Pierre Picaud, whose story was the inspiration for Edmond Dantès, the main character in Alexandre Dumas’s The Count of Monte Cristo. The Kingdom of Sardinia locked political prisoners, Mazzini's supporters and common criminals in the fort, including the Archbishop Luigi Fransoni.

After the unification of Italy, around a thousand of Kingdom of the Two Sicilies soldiers were put into the fort. Several Garibaldi's and Papal States supporters were also locked up.

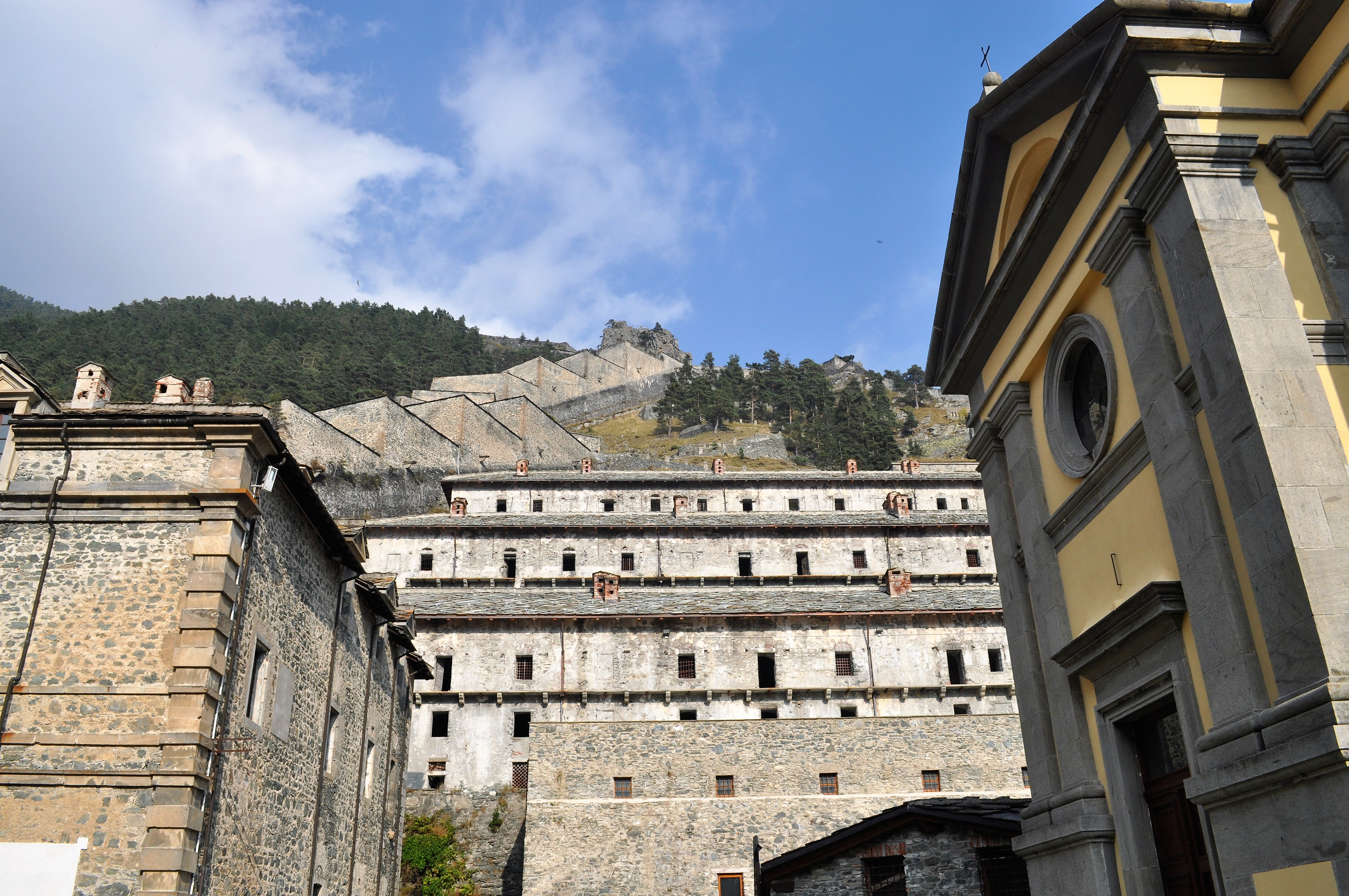
View upward

After the Kingdom of Italy joined the Triple Alliance in 1882, the fort was upgraded. After 1887, it became the headquarters of the Fenestrelle battalion of the 3rd Alpini Regiment.

After World War II, the fort was abandoned and left to decay, most of the available material being plundered. In 1990 a redevelopment action, guided by a group of volunteers, known as Progetto San Carlo (ONLUS) was started. In the 1999 it has become the symbol of the former Province of Turin and in 2007 the World Monuments Fund has included it among the 100 most important archaeological sites of the world.
