= Lorenzo Bernardino Pinto =

Italian architect (1704–1788)

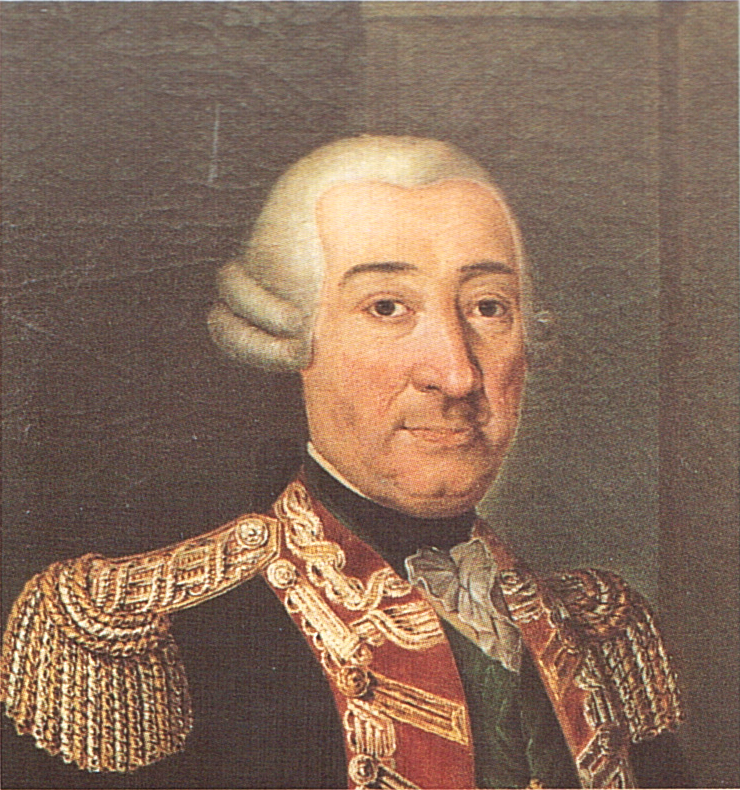
Portrait of Lorenzo Bernardino Pinto

Lorenzo Bernardino Pinto di Barri (9 August 1704 – 18 March 1788) was an Italian architect. His works include the Fort San Vittorio of Tortona.

== Biography ==
He was born in 1704 in Bianzè, the son of the surgeon Giuseppe Ferdinando Antonio and Petronilla Pinto. He joined the army of the Kingdom of Sardinia in 1730, when he obtained the rank of second lieutenant in artillery. Thanks to his ability to understand the problems of fortifications, he was promoted to lieutenant on 18 May 1737. In 1744 during the siege of Cuneo he gave proof of courage by remaining on the front line and risking his life in the collapse of the walls caused by a mine by the besiegers. The excellent performance provided at Cuneo earned him the promotion to the rank of colonel of the royal corps of engineers, the role in which he directed the siege of Savona in 1744, conquering the city in just 18 days. After this feat, King Charles Emmanuel III decided to give Pinto the knight's cross of the Mauritian Order.

On 17 July 1755, upon the death of Count Ignazio Bertola, he was promoted to colonel of the royal corps of engineers and, with this post, he began the renovation works of the Exilles fort and the Demonte fort. In 1767 he bought the title of Count of Barri di Massone for 5,000 lire. He was eventually promoted to the rank of lieutenant general; while enjoying the esteem of Charles Emmanuel III, he was opposed by the war minister Count Giovanni Battista Lorenzo Bogino who preferred the son of Ignazio Bertola. Following the death of Charles Emmanuel III, the new ruler Victor Amadeus III of Sardinia entrusted Pinto with the task of strengthening the eastern frontier against the Austrians; in particular with the strengthening of the fort of Tortona, which became his masterpiece. He died in 1788 in Turin when the works on the Tortona fort were not yet completed.

== Works ==
Pinto collaborated on the fortifications of Exilles, Demonte and the Citadel of Alexandria, progressively developing the ideas that he would then condense in the fort of Tortona. He independently reached the same conclusions as the more famous Marc René de Montalembert. Pinto wanted to build an impregnable fortress that would not only serve as a defense but also as an attack, therefore the central body of the fort was entirely made up of casemate buildings, arranged on several floors and bomb-proof, whose structures were used as a shelter for the garrison, warehouses for war equipment and, if necessary, could house artillery pieces. The fort resembled 19th-century fortresses more than its contemporaries, a sign that Pinto's ideas were at the forefront and influenced the next generation of architects.
