= Martelella mediterranea =

Scientific classification
- Domain: Bacteria
- Kingdom: Pseudomonadati
- Phylum: Pseudomonadota
- Class: Alphaproteobacteria
- Order: Hyphomicrobiales
- Family: Rhizobiaceae
- Genus: Martelella
- Species: M. mediterranea

Binomial name
- Martelella mediterranea Rivas et al. 2005

Type strain
- CECT 5861, CIP 108716, DSM 17316, LMG 22193, MACL11, Rivas MACL11

Synonyms
- Martelia mediterranea

Species of bacterium

Martelella mediterranea is a Gram-negative, oxidase- and catalase-positive, strictly aerobic, non-spore-forming, non-motile bacteria from the genus of Martelella which was isolated from water sample from the Lake Martel on Mallorca in Spain.
