= Ciceribacter lividus =

Scientific classification
- Domain: Bacteria
- Kingdom: Pseudomonadati
- Phylum: Pseudomonadota
- Class: Alphaproteobacteria
- Order: Hyphomicrobiales
- Family: Rhizobiaceae
- Genus: Ciceribacter
- Species: C. lividus

Binomial name
- Ciceribacter lividus Kathiravan et al. 2013

Type strain
- DSM 25528; KCTC 32403; MSSRFBL1

Species of bacterium

Ciceribacter lividus is a nitrogen fixing, Gram-negative, aerobic and motile bacterium from the genus Ciceribacter which has been isolated from rhizosphere soil from the plant Cicer arietinum in Kannivadi, India.
