= Hoeflea marina =

Scientific classification
- Domain: Bacteria
- Kingdom: Pseudomonadati
- Phylum: Pseudomonadota
- Class: Alphaproteobacteria
- Order: Hyphomicrobiales
- Family: Rhizobiaceae
- Genus: Hoeflea
- Species: H. marina

Binomial name
- Hoeflea marina Peix et al. 2005

Type strain
- A43, ATCC 25654, CECT 4356, DSM 16791, ICPB 4166, LMG 128

Species of bacterium

Hoeflea marina is a Gram-negative, oxidase- and catalase-positive, non-spore-forming, rod-shaped bacteria from the genus Hoeflea which was isolated from marine environments in Germany. Agrobacterium ferrugineum was reclassified to Hoeflea marina.
