= Shinella zoogloeoides =

Scientific classification
- Domain: Bacteria
- Kingdom: Pseudomonadati
- Phylum: Pseudomonadota
- Class: Alphaproteobacteria
- Order: Hyphomicrobiales
- Family: Rhizobiaceae
- Genus: Shinella
- Species: S. zoogloeoides

Binomial name
- Shinella zoogloeoides An et al. 2006

Type strain
- ATCC 19623; DSM 287; I-16-M; IAM 12669; JCM 20728; NBRC 102405

Synonyms
- Crabtreella saccharophila Xie and Yokota 2006

Species of bacterium

Shinella zoogloeoides is a bacterium of the genus Shinella.
