= Hoeflea halophila =

Scientific classification
- Domain: Bacteria
- Kingdom: Pseudomonadati
- Phylum: Pseudomonadota
- Class: Alphaproteobacteria
- Order: Hyphomicrobiales
- Family: Rhizobiaceae
- Genus: Hoeflea
- Species: H. halophila

Binomial name
- Hoeflea halophila Jung et al. 2013

Type strain
- JCM 16715, JG120-1, KCTC 23107

Species of bacterium

Hoeflea halophila is a Gram-negative, aerobic, motile bacteria from the genus Hoeflea which was isolated from marine sediment from the Sea of Japan.
