= Mycoplana dimorpha =

Scientific classification
- Domain: Bacteria
- Kingdom: Pseudomonadati
- Phylum: Pseudomonadota
- Class: Alphaproteobacteria
- Order: Hyphomicrobiales
- Family: Rhizobiaceae
- Genus: Mycoplana
- Species: M. dimorpha

Binomial name
- Mycoplana dimorpha Gray and Thornton 1928

Type strain
- AS 4.1473, ATCC 4279, CFBP 6724, CGMCC 4.1473, DSM 7138, Gray 103, HAMBI 2262, IAM 13154, IFO 13291, JCM 20847, LMG 4061, M31, NBRC 13291, NCIB 9439, NCIM 2383, NRRL B-1091, RIA 1949, STM 2151, TK0055, VKM Ac-911, B-2530

Species of bacterium

Mycoplana dimorpha is a gram-negative bacteria from the genus of Mycoplana.
