= Hoeflea alexandrii =

Scientific classification
- Domain: Bacteria
- Kingdom: Pseudomonadati
- Phylum: Pseudomonadota
- Class: Alphaproteobacteria
- Order: Hyphomicrobiales
- Family: Rhizobiaceae
- Genus: Hoeflea
- Species: H. alexandrii

Binomial name
- Hoeflea alexandrii Palacios et al. 2006

Type strain
- AM1V30, CECT 5682, DSM 16655, KCTC 22096

Synonyms
- Mesorhizobium alexandrii

Species of bacterium

Hoeflea alexandrii is a Gram-negative, oxidase-negative, catalase-positive, non-spore-forming, motile bacteria with a single polar flagella from the genus Hoeflea which was isolated from Alexandrium minutum AL1V in Vigo in Spain.
