= Hoeflea olei =

Scientific classification
- Domain: Bacteria
- Kingdom: Pseudomonadati
- Phylum: Pseudomonadota
- Class: Alphaproteobacteria
- Order: Hyphomicrobiales
- Family: Rhizobiaceae
- Genus: Hoeflea
- Species: H. olei

Binomial name
- Hoeflea olei Rahul et al. 2015

Type strain
- KCTC 42071, LMG 28200, JC234

Species of bacterium

Hoeflea olei is a Gram-negative and rod-shaped bacteria from the genus Hoeflea which has been isolated from water in Kerala in India. Hoeflea olei has the ability to degrade diesel oil.
