= Peteryoungia aggregata =

Scientific classification
- Domain: Bacteria
- Kingdom: Pseudomonadati
- Phylum: Pseudomonadota
- Class: Alphaproteobacteria
- Order: Hyphomicrobiales
- Family: Rhizobiaceae
- Genus: Peteryoungia
- Species: P. aggregata

Binomial name
- Peteryoungia aggregata (Hirsch and Müller 1986) Kuzmanović et al. 2022

Type strain
- ATCC 43293; DSM 111; DSM 1111; IFAM 1003; Müller 161; Miller 161; VKM B-2061

Synonyms
- Blastobacter aggregatus Hirsch and Müller 1986; Rhizobium aggregatum (Hirsch and Müller 1986) Kaur et al. 2011

Species of bacterium

Peteryoungia aggregata is a gram-negative bacterium of the genus Peteryoungia.
