= Mycoplana ramosa =

Scientific classification
- Domain: Bacteria
- Kingdom: Pseudomonadati
- Phylum: Pseudomonadota
- Class: Alphaproteobacteria
- Order: Hyphomicrobiales
- Family: Rhizobiaceae
- Genus: Mycoplana
- Species: M. ramosa

Binomial name
- Mycoplana ramosa Urakami et al. 1990

Type strain
- ATCC 49678, CGMCC 4.1474, DSM 7292, IAM 13949, IFO 15249, JCM 7822, LMG 3026, M51, NBRC 15249, NCIB 9440, NCIM 2382, NCIMB 9440, TK 0053

Synonyms
- Mycoplana bullata

Species of bacterium

Mycoplana ramosa is a gram-negative bacteria from the genus of Mycoplana.
