= Endobacterium cereale =

Scientific classification
- Domain: Bacteria
- Kingdom: Pseudomonadati
- Phylum: Pseudomonadota
- Class: Alphaproteobacteria
- Order: Hyphomicrobiales
- Family: Rhizobiaceae
- Genus: Endobacterium
- Species: E. cereale

Binomial name
- Endobacterium cereale corrig. Menéndez et al. 2021

Synonyms
- Endobacterium cerealis Menéndez et al. 2021

Genus of bacteria

Endobacterium cereale is a species of Gram-negative bacteria.
