= Pseudorhizobium pelagicum =

Scientific classification
- Domain: Bacteria
- Kingdom: Pseudomonadati
- Phylum: Pseudomonadota
- Class: Alphaproteobacteria
- Order: Hyphomicrobiales
- Family: Rhizobiaceae
- Genus: Pseudorhizobium
- Species: P. pelagicum

Binomial name
- Pseudorhizobium pelagicum Kimes et al. 2017

Type strain
- CECT 8629; LMG 28314; R1-200B4

Genus of bacteria

Pseudorhizobium pelagicum is a species of Gram-negative marine bacteria isolated from Mediterranean sea.
