= Ciceribacter =

Scientific classification
- Domain: Bacteria
- Kingdom: Pseudomonadati
- Phylum: Pseudomonadota
- Class: Alphaproteobacteria
- Order: Hyphomicrobiales
- Family: Rhizobiaceae
- Genus: Ciceribacter; Kathiravan et al. 2013

Type species
- Ciceribacter lividus Kathiravan et al. 2013

Species
- C. azotifigens Siddiqi et al. 2018; "C. daejeonensis" (Quan et al. 2005) Rahi et al. 2021; "C. ferrooxidans" Deng et al. 2020; C. lividus Kathiravan et al. 2013; C. naphthalenivorans (Kaiya et al. 2018) Rahi et al. 2021; C. selenitireducens (Hunter et al. 2008) Rahi et al. 2021; C. thiooxidans Deng et al. 2017

Genus of bacteria

Ciceribacter is a bacterial genus of the family Rhizobiaceae.

== Phylogeny ==
The currently accepted taxonomy is based on the List of Prokaryotic names with Standing in Nomenclature (LPSN). The phylogeny is based on whole-genome analysis.

- - Ciceribacter
    - - Ciceribacter selenitireducens
      - Ciceribacter naphthalenivorans
    - - Ciceribacter daejeonensis
      - - Ciceribacter lividus
        - - Ciceribacter thiooxidans
          - Ciceribacter ferrooxidans
  - outgroups
    Peteryoungia
