= Lentilitoribacter donghaensis =

Scientific classification
- Domain: Bacteria
- Kingdom: Pseudomonadati
- Phylum: Pseudomonadota
- Class: Alphaproteobacteria
- Order: Hyphomicrobiales
- Family: Rhizobiaceae
- Genus: Lentilitoribacter
- Species: L. donghaensis

Binomial name
- Lentilitoribacter donghaensis Park et al. 2013

Type strain
- BH-4, CCUG 62792, KCTC 32082

Species of bacterium

Lentilitoribacter donghaensis is a Gram-negative, aerobic, non-spore-forming bacteria from the genus of Lentilitoribacter which was isolated from coastal seawater from the Sea of Japan in South Korea.
