= Hoeflea anabaenae =

Scientific classification
- Domain: Bacteria
- Kingdom: Pseudomonadati
- Phylum: Pseudomonadota
- Class: Alphaproteobacteria
- Order: Hyphomicrobiales
- Family: Rhizobiaceae
- Genus: Hoeflea
- Species: H. anabaenae

Binomial name
- Hoeflea anabaenae Stevenson et al. 2011

Type strain
- CCUG 56626, NRRL B-59520, WH2K

Species of bacterium

Hoeflea anabaenae is a bacterium from the genus Hoeflea.
