= Martelella endophytica =

Scientific classification
- Domain: Bacteria
- Kingdom: Pseudomonadati
- Phylum: Pseudomonadota
- Class: Alphaproteobacteria
- Order: Hyphomicrobiales
- Family: Rhizobiaceae
- Genus: Martelella
- Species: M. endophytica

Binomial name
- Martelella endophytica Bibi et al. 2013

Type strain
- KCCM 43011, NBRC 109149, YC6887

Species of bacterium

Martelella endophytica is a Gram-negative, aerobic, non-spore-forming, non-motile bacteria from the genus of Martelella which was isolated from the plant Rosa rugosa on the Namhae Island in Korea.
