= Fort of Exilles =

Fortified complex in the Susa Valley, Piedmont, Italy

Coordinates: 45.0983°N 6.9319°E

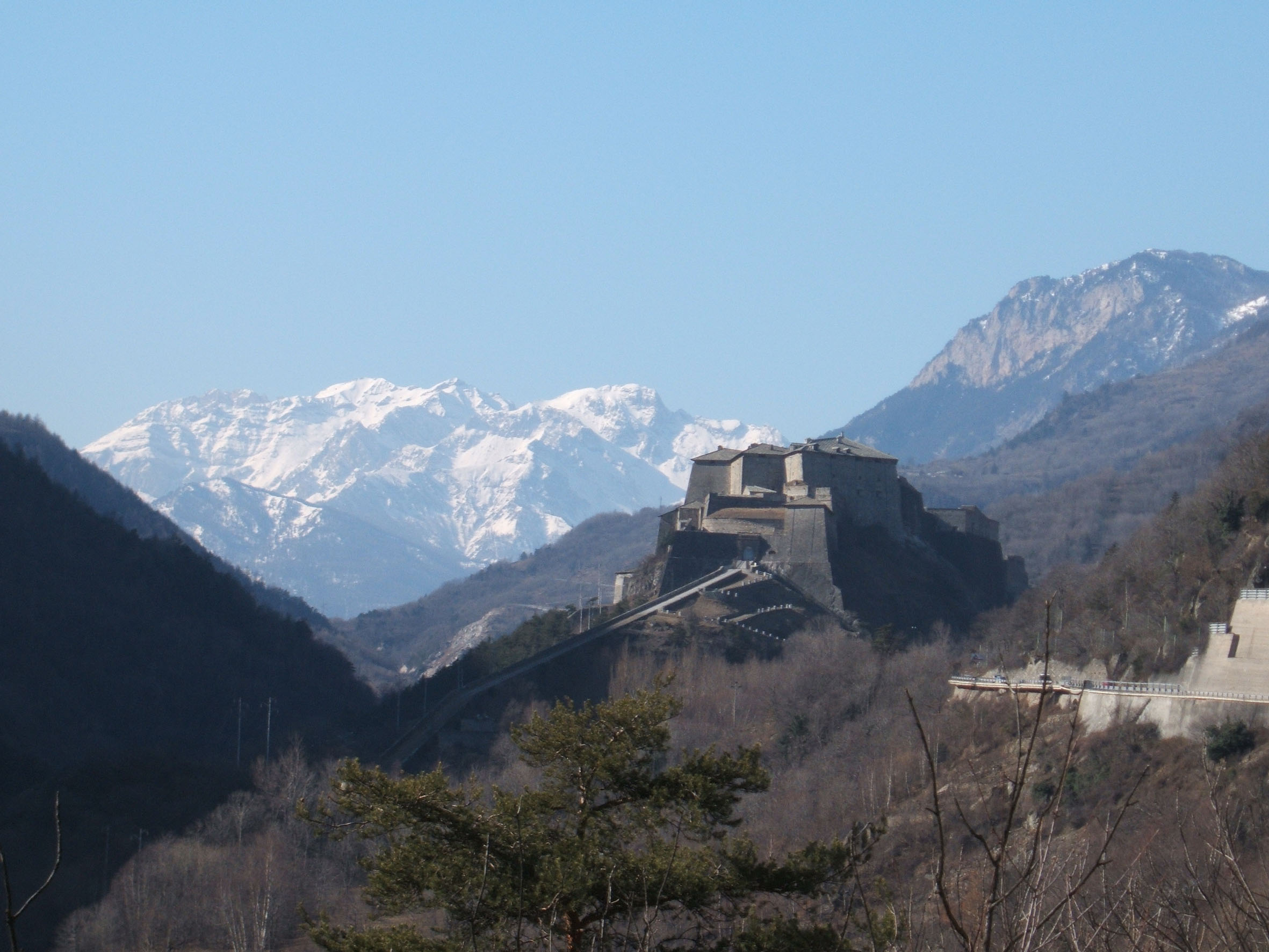
Fort of Exilles.

The Exilles Fort (Italian: Forte di Exilles [ˈfɔrte di eˈksil, - eˈɡzil]; French: Fort d'Exilles [fɔʁ dɛɡzil]) is a fortified complex in the Susa Valley, Metropolitan City of Turin, Piedmont, Northern Italy. Together with the nearby Fort of Fenestrelle and the Forte Albertino (at Vinadio, in the province of Cuneo) it was part of the defensive line between the House of Savoy lands (later of the Kingdom of Italy) and France: both these states held it in different phases depending on the outcome of the various wars. It is located on a spur commanding one of the narrowest sections of the Susa Valley, along the main road connecting Turin to France.

== History ==
The first mention of a fortified structure in the place dates from the 7th century, when a chronicler of the Abbey of Novalesa wrote of a fortification on the spur overlooking Exilles, perhaps destroyed by the Franks. Starting from 1155, the fort was held by the Bermond family of Besançon, counts of Albon, who owned the road passing near it and leading to the Monginevro Pass.

The first description of the castle dates from 1339: it had a quadrangular plan with more towers, quite different from the massive structure visible today. Between 1494 and 1496 it was used as an ammunition depot by Charles VIII of France, who enlarged the main entrance and enrolled peasants of the area to defend it. In the 16th century it was further reinforced with more towers under Charles II of Savoy. In 1541 it was again under French rule, though, according to the Treaty of Cateau-Cambrésis (1559), it was reacquired by Emmanuel Philibert of Savoy. In 1591 it was recaptured by the French after a short siege, but two years later Charles Emmanuel I of Savoy took it back and strengthened it, in particular on the side facing the upper Susa Valley.

In 1595, after a month-long siege, it was again in French hands. The Savoyards would receive it back only in 1708, after the War of the Spanish Succession. In this century the French strongly rebuilt the fort. In 1720 the Piedmontese revised it under the direction of military engineer Ignazio Bertola. In 1745, during the War of the Austrian Succession, the French attacked the fort, but were pushed back.

When Napoleon Bonaparte conquered Italy in the early 19th century, the fort was demolished. It was rebuilt in 1818–1829, updating the pre-existing architecture to more modern military concepts. The fort belonged to the Italian Army until 1943, after which it was abandoned. In 1978 the Piedmontese Regional Authority acquired it and launched a restoration program. The fort was opened to the public in 2000, housing the Museo Nazionale della Montagna (National Mountain Museum) and occasional exhibitions.

The famous historical character known as L'homme au masque de fer (The Man in the Iron Mask) spent some years captive in the fortress jail.

== Sources ==
- Mancinelli, Laura (2001). La lunga notte di Exilles. Turin: Einaudi.
- Barrera, Francesco (2002). I Sette Forti di Exilles. Metamorfosi architettonica di un complesso fortificato. Turin: Museo Nazionale della Montagna "Duca degli Abruzzi".
- Minola, Mauro (2000). Il Forte di Exilles. Sant'Ambrogio di Torino: Susalibri.
