= Hoeflea siderophila =

Scientific classification
- Domain: Bacteria
- Kingdom: Pseudomonadati
- Phylum: Pseudomonadota
- Class: Alphaproteobacteria
- Order: Hyphomicrobiales
- Family: Rhizobiaceae
- Genus: Hoeflea
- Species: H. siderophila

Binomial name
- Hoeflea siderophila Sorokina et al. 2026

Type strain
- DSM 21587; Hf-1; Hfl; UNIQEM 890; UQM 40581; VKM A-7094

Species of bacterium

Hoeflea siderophila is a neutrophilic iron-oxidizing, motile bacteria with a single polar flagellum, from the genus Hoeflea which was isolated from the Staraya Russa Resort in the Novgorod region in Russia.
