= Hoeflea phototrophica =

Scientific classification
- Domain: Bacteria
- Kingdom: Pseudomonadati
- Phylum: Pseudomonadota
- Class: Alphaproteobacteria
- Order: Hyphomicrobiales
- Family: Rhizobiaceae
- Genus: Hoeflea
- Species: H. phototrophica

Binomial name
- Hoeflea phototrophica Biebl et al. 2006

Type strain
- DFL-43, DSM 17068, NCIMB 14078

Species of bacterium

Hoeflea phototrophica are aerobic marine bacteria from the genus Hoeflea which was isolated from a culture of Prorocentrum lima.
