= Shinella =

Scientific classification
- Domain: Bacteria
- Kingdom: Pseudomonadati
- Phylum: Pseudomonadota
- Class: Alphaproteobacteria
- Order: Hyphomicrobiales
- Family: Rhizobiaceae
- Genus: Shinella; An et al. 2006

Type species
- Shinella granuli An et al. 2006

Species
- "Shinella albus" Li et al. 2016; Shinella curvata Subhash and Lee 2016; Shinella daejeonensis Lee et al. 2011; Shinella fusca Vaz-Moreira et al. 2010; Shinella granuli An et al. 2006; Shinella kummerowiae Lin et al. 2008; "Shinella oryzae" Gao et al. 2022; Shinella pollutisoli Mu et al. 2018; "Shinella sumterensis" Arya et al. 2022; Shinella yambaruensis Matsui et al. 2009; Shinella zoogloeoides An et al. 2006

Synonyms
- Crabtreella Xie and Yokota 2006

Genus of bacteria

Shinella is a genus of bacteria from the family Rhizobiaceae.
