= Mycoplana =

Scientific classification
- Domain: Bacteria
- Kingdom: Pseudomonadati
- Phylum: Pseudomonadota
- Class: Alphaproteobacteria
- Order: Hyphomicrobiales
- Family: Rhizobiaceae
- Genus: Mycoplana; Gray and Thornton 1928 (Approved Lists 1980)

Species
- M. dimorpha Gray and Thornton 1928 (Approved Lists 1980); M. ramosa Urakami et al. 1990; M. segnis Urakami et al. 1990; "M. subbaraonis" (Ramana et al. 2013) Hördt et al. 2020

Genus of bacteria

Mycoplana is a genus of Gram-negative bacteria. The cells are slightly curved or irregularly shaped rods. Initially, the cells can form filaments, which can also be branched. After some time, the filaments break up into irregular rods. Mycoplana is motile by peritrichous flagella.

== Etymology ==
The genus name Mycoplana consists of two words, mykos ("mushroom") and planos ("wandering"). It refers to the mobility and the similarity with fungi (the genus produces filaments like fungi).
