= Martelella =

Scientific classification
- Domain: Bacteria
- Kingdom: Pseudomonadati
- Phylum: Pseudomonadota
- Class: Alphaproteobacteria
- Order: Hyphomicrobiales
- Family: Rhizobiaceae
- Genus: Martelella; Rivas et al. 2005

Type species
- Martelella mediterranea Rivas et al. 2005

Species
- "Martelella alba" Li et al. 2021; Martelella caricis Lee 2019; Martelella endophytica Bibi et al. 2013; Martelella limonii Chung et al. 2016; Martelella lutilitoris Kim and Lee 2020; Martelella mangrovi Zhang and Margesin 2014; Martelella mediterranea Rivas et al. 2005; Martelella radicis Zhang and Margesin 2014; Martelella suaedae Chung et al. 2016

Genus of bacteria

Martelella is a genus of Gram-negative, oxidase- and catalase-positive, strictly aerobic, non-spore-forming bacteria from the family Rhizobiaceae.
