= Xaviernesmea =

Scientific classification
- Domain: Bacteria
- Kingdom: Pseudomonadati
- Phylum: Pseudomonadota
- Class: Alphaproteobacteria
- Order: Hyphomicrobiales
- Family: Rhizobiaceae
- Genus: Xaviernesmea; Kuzmanović et al. 2022

Type species
- Xaviernesmea oryzae (Peng et al. 2008) Kuzmanović et al. 2022

Species
- Xaviernesmea oryzae (Peng et al. 2008) Kuzmanović et al. 2022; Xaviernesmea rhizosphaerae Kuzmanović et al. 2022

Genus of bacteria

Xaviernesmea is a genus of bacteria from the family Rhizobiaceae.
