= Ferirhizobium =

Scientific classification
- Domain: Bacteria
- Kingdom: Pseudomonadati
- Phylum: Pseudomonadota
- Class: Alphaproteobacteria
- Order: Hyphomicrobiales
- Family: Rhizobiaceae
- Genus: Ferirhizobium corrig. Romanenko et al. 2024
- Species: F. litorale

Binomial name
- Ferirhizobium litorale corrig. Romanenko et al. 2024

Type strain
- KMM 9576, NRIC 957

Synonyms
- Fererhizobium litorale

Species of bacterium

Ferirhizobium litorale is a gram-negative, rod-shaped, soil bacterium originally isolated for identification along the shore of the Sea of Japan. It is the only species in the genus Ferirhizobium. Formerly known as Fererhizobium litorale, Rhizobium sp. KMM 9576, and Rhizobium sp. KMM 9553, this bacterium is motile, and aerobic. Colonies are smooth, round, and whitish in appearance.

Ferirhizobium litorale is oxidase- and catalase-positive. As a bacterium found in soil, it is one of many that are incapable of nitrogen-fixing, since it lacks necessary genes for either nodulation or nitrogen fixation. It is also unable to hydrolyze starch, casein, and gelatin.

This bacteria is non-pathogenic and is found to be susceptible to rifampicin and streptomycin, but resistant to tetracycline, ampicillin, and vancomycin.
