= Vinadio =

Vinadio Vinai (Occitan)
- Comune
- Comune di Vinadio
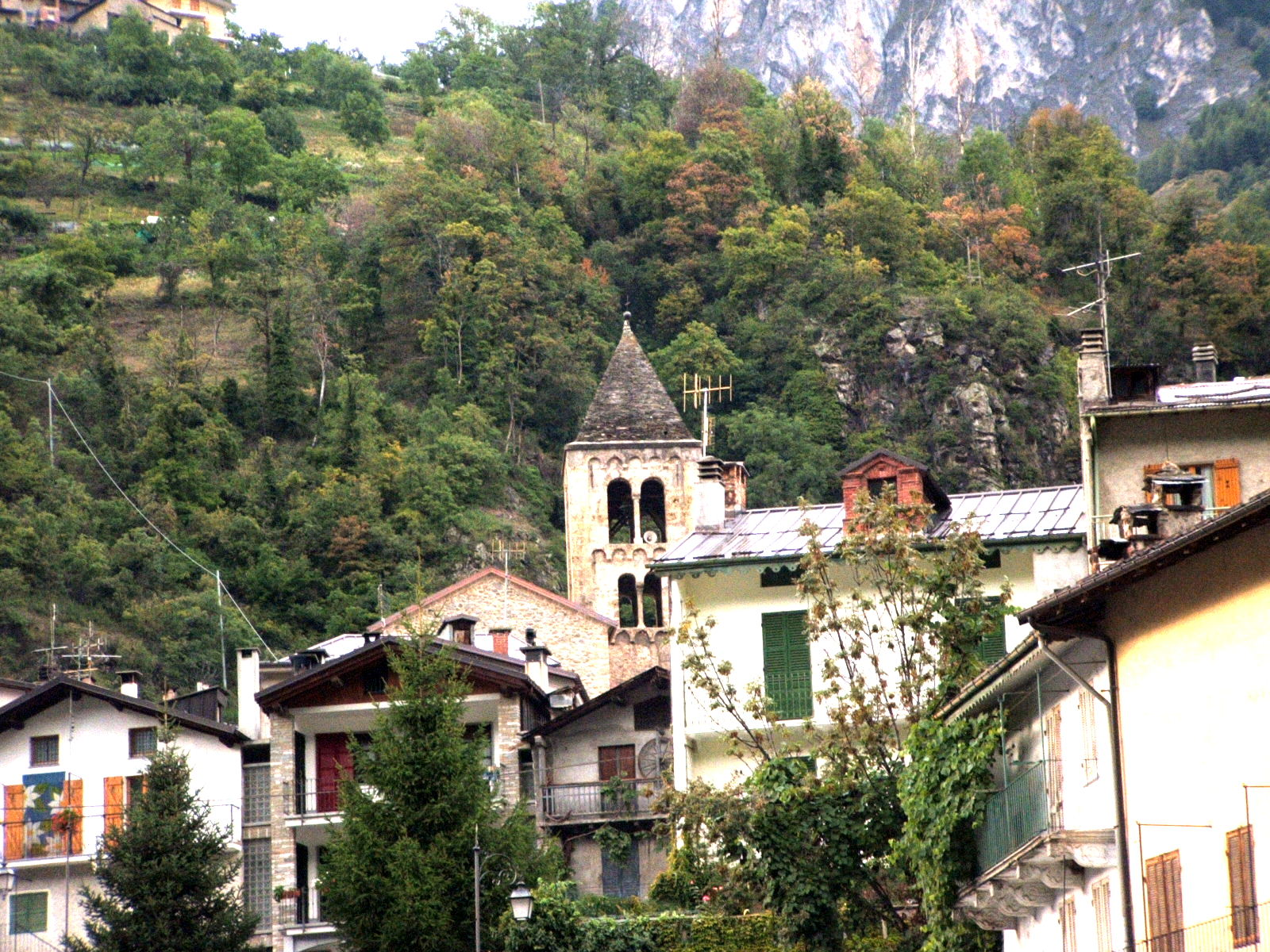

- Coat of arms

- Location within Italy Location within Piedmont
- Coordinates: 44°18′N 7°10′E
- Country: Italy
- Region: Piedmont
- Province: Cuneo (CN)
- Frazioni: Sant'Anna

Government
  - Mayor: Giuseppe Cornara

Area
  - Total: 183.17 km^{2} (70.72 sq mi)
- Elevation: 904 m (2,966 ft)

Population (30 November 2017)
  - Total: 630
  - Density: 3.4/km^{2} (8.9/sq mi)
- Demonym: Vinadiesi
- Time zone: UTC+1 (CET)
  - Summer (DST): UTC+2 (CEST)
- Postal code: 12010
- Dialing code: 0171
- Patron saint: Madonna del Vallone
- Saint day: Second Sunday in September

Vinadio (Occitan: Vinai) is a comune (municipality) in the Province of Cuneo in the Italian region of Piedmont, located about 100 kilometres (62 mi) southwest of Turin and about 30 kilometres (19 mi) southwest of Cuneo, on the border with France. It is located along the Stura di Demonte river.

Vinadio borders the following municipalities: Aisone, Demonte, Isola (France), Pietraporzio, Saint-Etienne-de-Tinée (France), Sambuco, and Valdieri.

== Main sights ==
In the frazione of Sant'Anna di Vinadio is the eponymous sanctuary, which is the highest elevation place of Christian worship in Europe at about 2,000 metres (6,600 ft). Vinadio is also home to an important fortification of the former Kingdom of Sardinia, the Forte Albertino.

- Lake Martel

== Culture ==
In 2003 the town hosted the 'World Meeting of 2CV Friends', where approximately 7,000 people from around the world met and camped around the ancient Forte Albertino.
