= Lentilitoribacter =

Scientific classification
- Domain: Bacteria
- Kingdom: Pseudomonadati
- Phylum: Pseudomonadota
- Class: Alphaproteobacteria
- Order: Hyphomicrobiales
- Family: Rhizobiaceae
- Genus: Lentilitoribacter; Park et al. 2013

Type species
- Lentilitoribacter donghaensis

Species
- L. donghaensis

Genus of bacteria

Lentilitoribacter is a genus of Gram-negative, aerobic, non-spore-forming bacteria. Lentilitoribacter donghaensis is the only known species of this genus.
