= Allorhizobium =

Scientific classification
- Domain: Bacteria
- Kingdom: Pseudomonadati
- Phylum: Pseudomonadota
- Class: Alphaproteobacteria
- Order: Hyphomicrobiales
- Family: Rhizobiaceae
- Genus: Allorhizobium de Lajudie et al. 1998

Type species
- Allorhizobium undicola de Lajudie et al. 1998

Species
- "Allorhizobium ampelinum" Kuzmanović et al. 2022; Allorhizobium borbori (Zhang et al. 2011) Mousavi et al. 2016; Allorhizobium oryziradicis (Zhao et al. 2017) Lin et al. 2020; "Allorhizobium paknamense" (Kittiwongwattana & Thawai 2013) Mousavi et al. 2015; Allorhizobium pseudoryzae (Zhang et al. 2011) Mousavi et al. 2016; Allorhizobium taibaishanense (Yao et al. 2012) Hördt et al. 2020; Allorhizobium terrae Lin et al. 2020; Allorhizobium undicola de Lajudie et al. 1998; Allorhizobium vitis (Ophel and Kerr 1990) Mousavi et al. 2016

Genus of bacteria

Allorhizobium is a genus of Gram-negative soil bacteria. Some species of Allorhizobium form an endosymbiotic nitrogen-fixing association with roots of legumes, while others are known to cause crown gall.
