= Georhizobium =

Scientific classification
- Domain: Bacteria
- Kingdom: Pseudomonadati
- Phylum: Pseudomonadota
- Class: Alphaproteobacteria
- Order: Hyphomicrobiales
- Family: Rhizobiaceae
- Genus: Georhizobium; Cao et al. 2020
- Species: G. profundi

Binomial name
- Georhizobium profundi Cao et al. 2020

Genus of bacteria

Georhizobium profundi is a species of Gram-negative bacteria. It is the only species in the genus Georhizobium.
