= Gellertiella =

Scientific classification
- Domain: Bacteria
- Kingdom: Pseudomonadati
- Phylum: Pseudomonadota
- Class: Alphaproteobacteria
- Order: Hyphomicrobiales
- Family: Rhizobiaceae
- Genus: Gellertiella; Tóth et al. 2017
- Species: G. hungarica

Binomial name
- Gellertiella hungarica Tóth et al. 2017

Genus of bacteria

Gellertiella hungarica is a species of Gram-negative bacteria. It is the only species in the genus Gellertiella.
