= Pseudorhizobium =

Scientific classification
- Domain: Bacteria
- Kingdom: Pseudomonadati
- Phylum: Pseudomonadota
- Class: Alphaproteobacteria
- Order: Hyphomicrobiales
- Family: Rhizobiaceae
- Genus: Pseudorhizobium; Kimes et al. 2017

Type species
- Pseudorhizobium pelagicum Kimes et al. 2017

Species
- Pseudorhizobium banfieldiae Lassalle et al. 2021; Pseudorhizobium endolithicum (Parag et al. 2014) Lassalle et al. 2021; Pseudorhizobium flavum (Gu et al. 2014) Lassalle et al. 2021; Pseudorhizobium halotolerans Lassalle et al. 2021; Pseudorhizobium marinum (Liu et al. 2015) Lassalle et al. 2021; Pseudorhizobium pelagicum Kimes et al. 2017; Pseudorhizobium tarimense (Turdahon et al. 2013) Kuzmanović et al. 2022

Genus of bacteria

Pseudorhizobium is a genus of bacteria from the family Rhizobiaceae.
