= Endobacterium =

Scientific classification
- Domain: Bacteria
- Kingdom: Pseudomonadati
- Phylum: Pseudomonadota
- Class: Alphaproteobacteria
- Order: Hyphomicrobiales
- Family: Rhizobiaceae
- Genus: Endobacterium; Kuzmanović et al. 2022

Type species
- Endobacterium cereale corrig. Menéndez et al. 2021

Species
- Endobacterium cereale corrig. Menéndez et al. 2021; Endobacterium yantingense (Chen et al. 2015) Kuzmanović et al. 2022

Genus of bacteria

Endobacterium is a genus of bacteria from the family Rhizobiaceae.
