= Cittadella of Alessandria =

Fortification in Italy

- Cittadella di Alessandria
- Alessandria, Italy
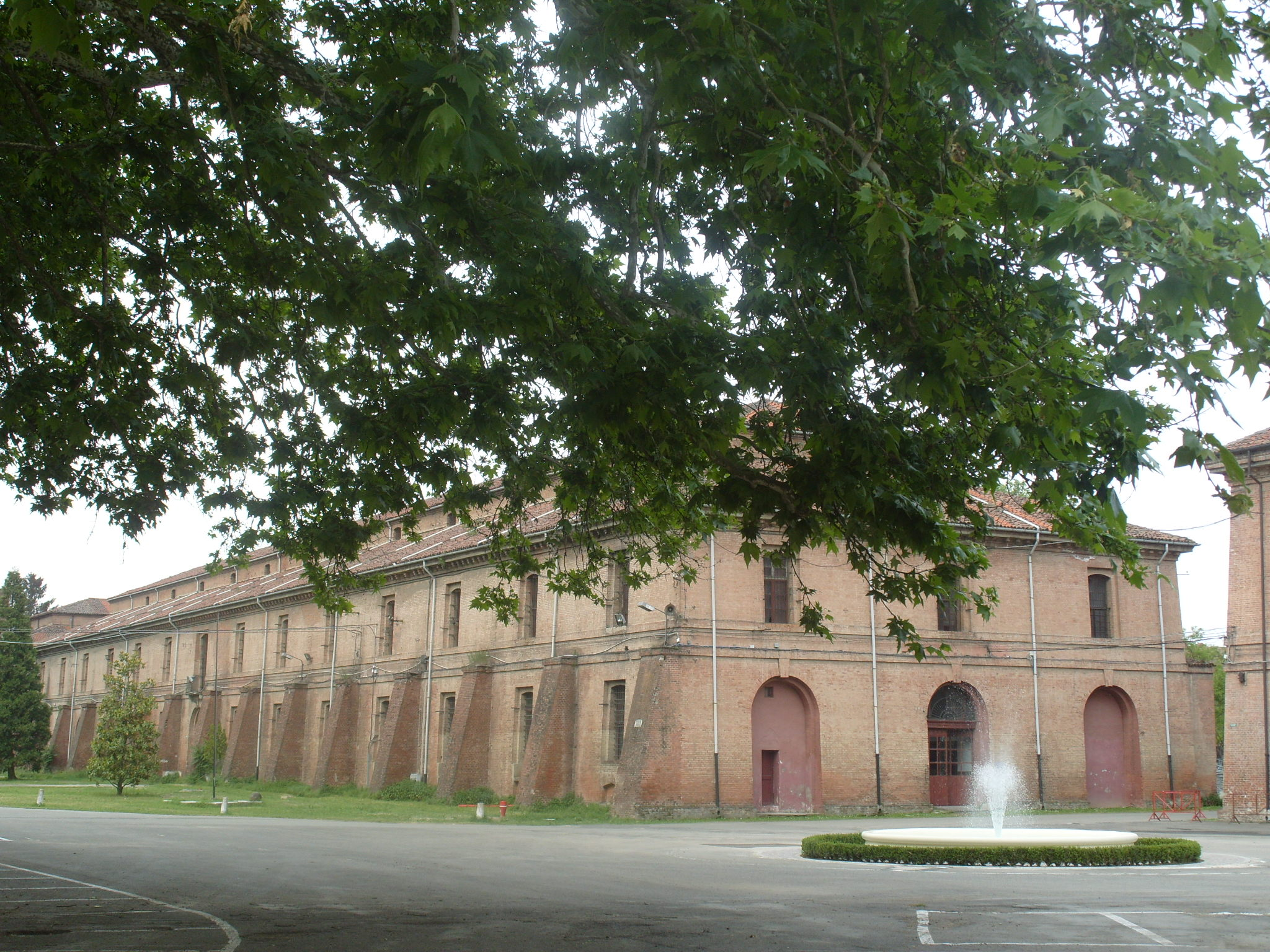
- Armoury in the Cittadella

Site information
- Type: Star fort
- Owner: Agenzia del demanio
- Controlled by: Ministry of Culture
- Open to the public: Yes
- Condition: Intact

Location
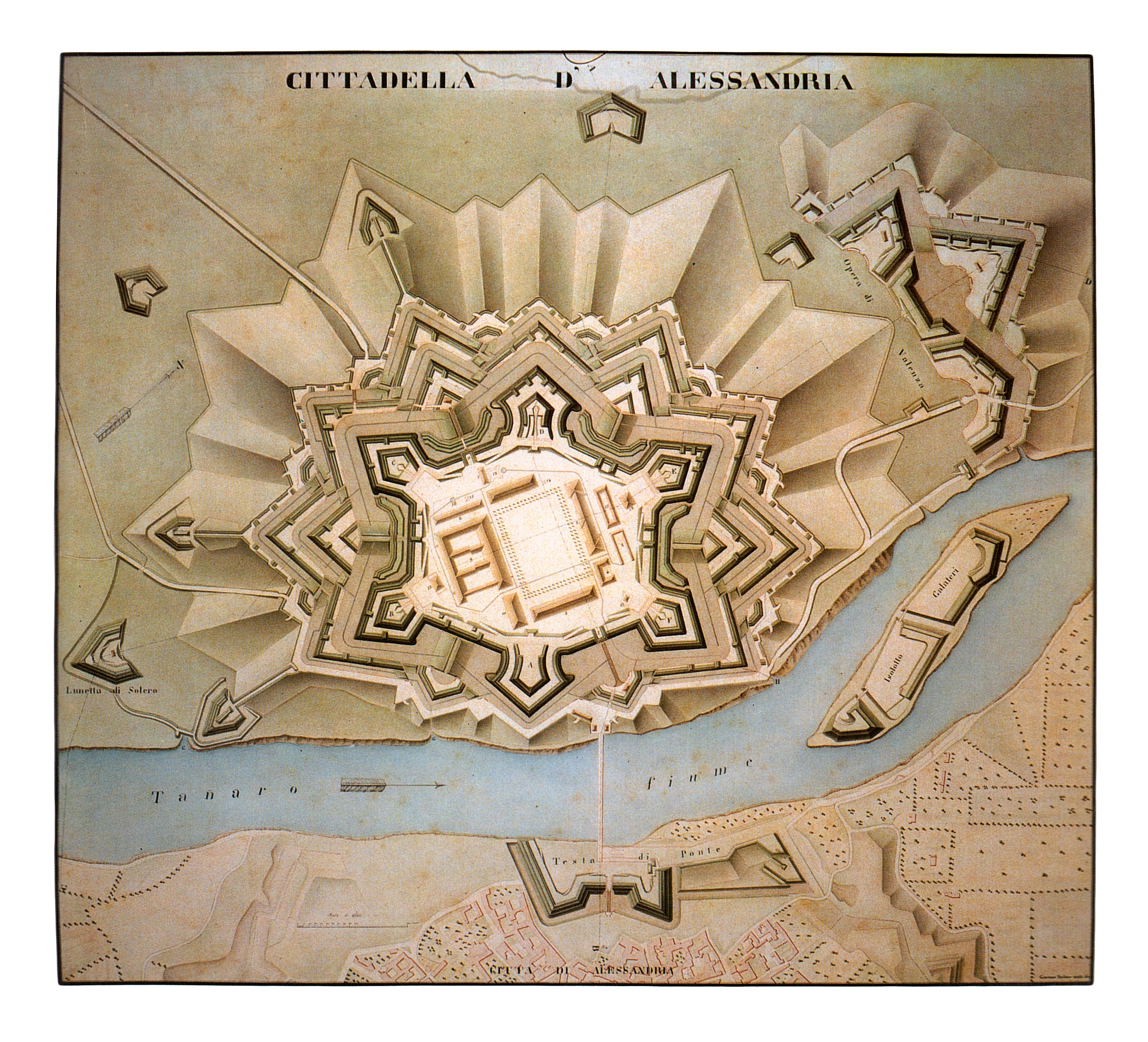
- 1846 map of the Cittadella and its outworks
- Cittadella of Alessandria
- Coordinates: 44°55′14.6″N 8°36′25.3″E

Site history
- Built: 1732–1808
- Built by: Kingdom of Sardinia
- In use: 1740s–2007
- Materials: Stone; Brick; Earthwork; Concrete
- Battles/wars: War of the Austrian Succession; Italian Campaign; Risorgimento; World War II

Garrison information
- Garrison: Royal Sardinian Army; Austrian Army of Italy (France) French Army of Italy; Royal Italian Army; Italian Army
- Occupants: 3rd Mountain Infantry Division Ravenna (Note: 37 and 38 Infantry Regiments)

The Cittadella of Alessandria (Italian: Cittadella di Alessandria) is a star fort and citadel in the city of Alessandria, Italy. It was built in the 18th century by the Kingdom of Sardinia, and today it is one of the best preserved fortifications of that era. It is one of the few fortifications in Europe still in their original environment, since there are no buildings blocking the views of the ramparts, or a road that surrounds the ditches.

On 10 March 1821, during the Piedmont insurrection, the blue, red and black tricolour of the Carbonari was raised on the Cittadella's bastions by Colonel Ansaldi. This was the first use of a tricolour flag in the history of Italy.

The Cittadella has been Italy's tentative list of UNESCO World Heritage Sites since 2006.

== Location ==
The fortress lies across the river Tanaro in the north-west side of the city of Alessandria. The site is one of the lowest in the Piedmont region with an altitude of about 90 metres (300 ft) above sea-level.

== History ==
=== Social, historical and geopolitical context ===
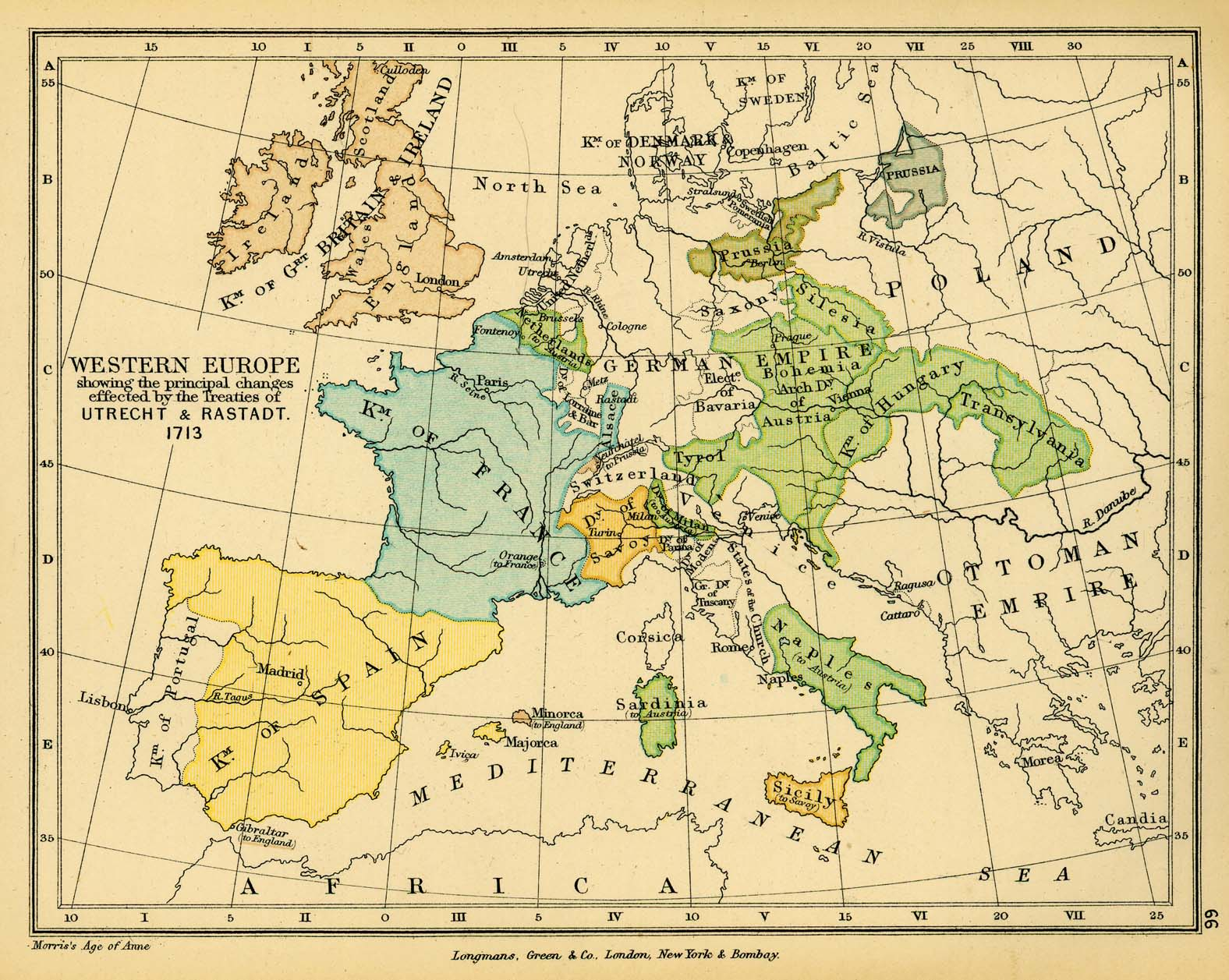
Map of Europe according to the Treaty of Utrecht

Since its foundation, 1168, the town of Alessandria was always meant to be a border town with a strategic-military vocation. From the 14th century has joined the Visconti of Milan against Monferrato and Asti, with the Sforza then in the 15th century, and consequently under the Spaniards rule after, throughout the 17th century.

The construction of the fortress began immediately after the signing of the Treaty of Utrecht in 1713. The treaty handed ownership of the Citadel from the Spaniards to the House of Savoy. A massive fortification project followed, during which much of Alessandria's town-planning were changed to bolster the fortress's defenses.

In order to meet the needs of defense of the new state of Savoy, it was decided to build a massive fortress designed to function as a barrier of military transits traveling along the "Road of Flanders", the ancient Spanish military road that connected the harbors of Genova, Savona and Finale Ligure with the Netherlands.

=== 18th century ===
==== Construction ====
The Citadel plan was commissioned by King Vittorio Amedeo II and effectively built, in 1732, by King Charles Emmanuel III. The project's architect was Ignazio Bertola. The fortress is a six-star hexagon-shaped structure.

The Citadel was built entirely at the expense of the ancient quarter of Borgoglio (or Bergoglio) provoking strong urban revolution. It was completed in its main components in the 1740s while inside the fortified hexagon the buildings of the civilians were gradually demolished to make way for new military quarters and the inhabitants were forced to relocate, replaced by a garrison ever more numerous.

The result is an immense fortress which extends over 74 hectares (180 acres) whose longer side is parallel to the axis of the river. The Citadel is a perfect example of modern fortress composed of six bastioned fronts supplied with cavalieri crossed by tunnels and casemates. The fortress is surrounded by a wide moat, in connection with the Tanaro river through flooding tunnels, scheduled to be flooded by the waters of the river, and protected by tenaglioni, ravelins, counterguards and ridottes.

The entrance is by a long stone bridge that leads to a large area surrounded by multi-storey buildings arranged along the axis of the ancient quarter, all protected by resistant embankments constructed between 1749 and 1831.

==== The War of the Austrian Succession ====
The Citadel was tested by fire the first time between 1745 and 1746 when it resisted the French-Spanish army for seven months, during the War of the Austrian Succession. The Citadel was still incomplete and not well armed.

==== First Italian Campaign ====
At the end of the First Italian Campaign, the Citadel was in the hands of the French: in July 1799 it was under siege by the Austro-Russian Army led by Aleksandr Vasilyevich Suvorov. After three days of bombing were inflicted serious damage to the fortified structures and the French were forced to surrender.

=== 19th century ===
==== French occupation ====
Following the Battle of Marengo and the proclamation of the First French Empire, Napoleon expanded and renovated the fort to support the operations of the French army in Italy. During the French occupation, the citadel became one of the most important fortresses in the French Empire, since it was intended to be the "eastern gateway" of France.

==== European restoration ====
In 1814 the Austrian army captured the fort and transferred it to the restored Kingdom of Sardinia. The fort was renovated, and by the mid-19th century it became an important bulwark against the Austrian Empire.

==== Risorgimento ====
On 10 March 1821, the Cittadella's garrison mutinied, marking the beginning of the Piedmont insurrection, and Colonel Ansaldi raised the blue, red and black tricolour of the Carbonari on the bastions. The insurrection spread quickly throughout Piedmont, but it was suppressed by the Austrians at the end of April. The Austrians subsequently took over the fort and occupied it until 1823. Various Young Italy affiliates were imprisoned in the fort, and five were executed by firing squad in 1833.

After the Austrians defeated the Kingdom of Sardinia during the Battle of Novara in 1849, the fort was again occupied by Austrian forces for three months. After the Alessandria was back in Sardinian hands, the number of guns within the Cittadella was increased, and three nearby Napoleonic forts (Forte Ferrovia, Forte Bormida and Forte Acqui) were strengthened. The fort saw use during the Second Italian War of Independence of 1859, and Napoleon III spent some time there during the war.

==== Kingdom of Italy ====
Following the Italian unification and the proclamation of the Kingdom of Italy, Alessandria became a defensive centre of the kingdom's western border. In 1889, the Cittadella's status changed to command headquarters and barracks. Nonetheless, it remained a key site for the Royal Italian Army.

=== 20th century ===
In 1901 the Army Corps of Engineers decommissioned the citadel's cinta magistrale. The Forte di Acqui, the Opera di Valenza and the citadel's outworks were decommissioned in 1904.

Several regiments were stationed in the Cittadella, including the 37th and 38th Infantry Regiments, which formed part of the 3rd Mountain Infantry Division Ravenna.

==== World War II ====
The Governor's Palace in the Cittadella was declared a National Monument by royal charter dated 17 May 1943.

On 9 September 1943, the Germans entered Alessandria and captured the Cittadella after a short bombardment. The Italian garrison surrendered and were deported to Germany. The city of Alessandria was heavily bombed on 5 September 1944, but the Cittadella did not suffer a lot of damage. However, a bomb shelter located near the fort was hit, killing 39 civilians.

The Cittadella was captured by partisans in 1945, and it subsequently became the seat of the Brazilian Expeditionary Force.

==== Post-war era ====
From 1953 to 1962, the citadel was home to the 52nd Artillery Regiment "Torino". It was then used for logistics functions and as a magazine.

In 1994, the citadel was flooded by the river, and many buildings were severely damaged. Today, some areas are still filled with mud from the flood.

=== 21st century ===
The Cittadella was officially decommissioned in 2007, when the Ministry of Defence handed it over to the Italian Public Property Agency.

On 18 June 2010, a permanent exhibition of about 1500 uniforms, weapons and memorabilia of the Royal Italian Army was established within the fort.

In 2014, the Cittadella was listed as one of "The 7 Most Endangered" sites by Europa Nostra, mainly due to the spread of weeds which threatens the fortification.

== Gallery ==
Victor Amadeus II of Sardinia

Charles Emmanuel III of Sardinia

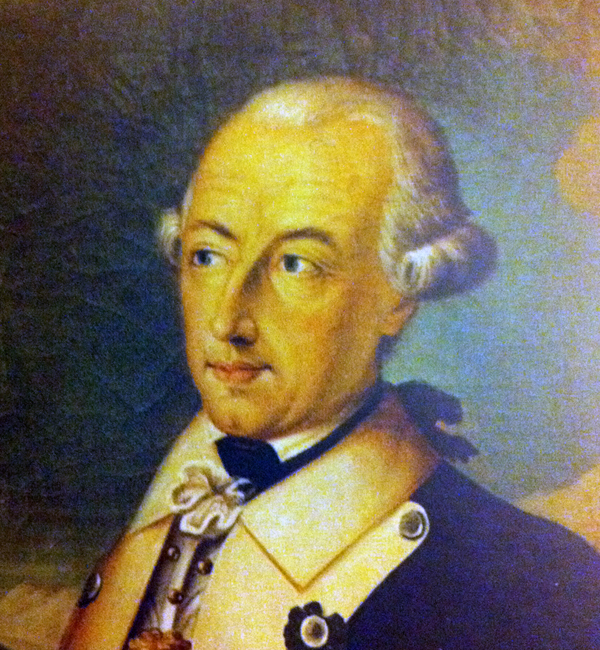
Ignazio Bertola, architect

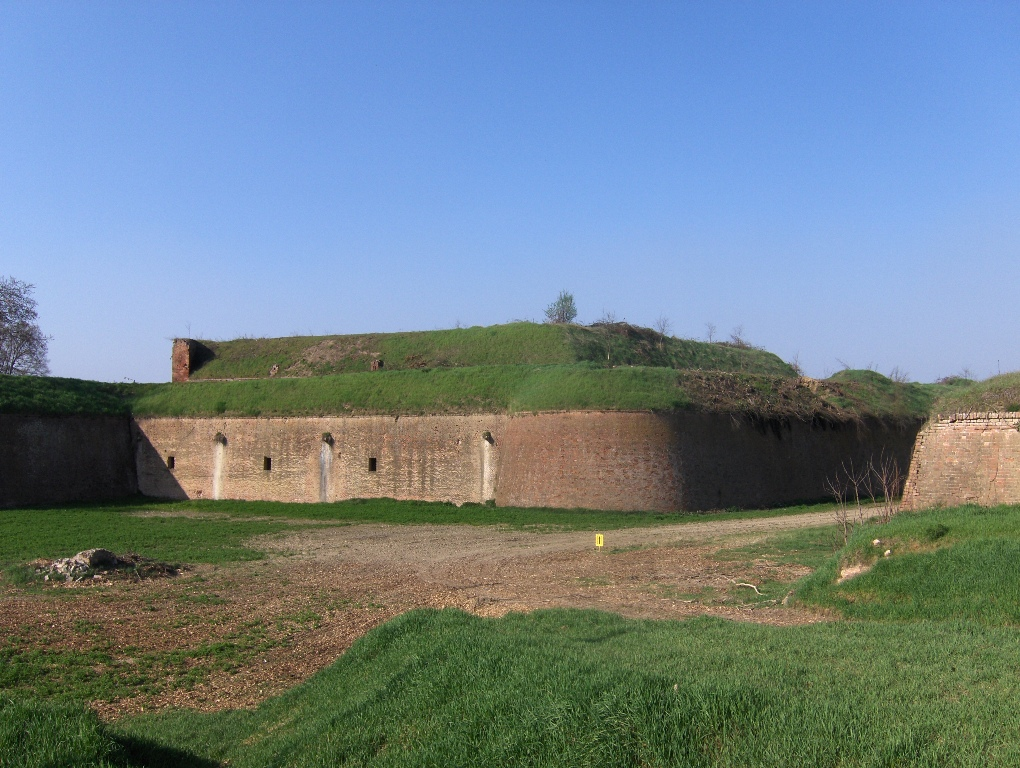
Bastion

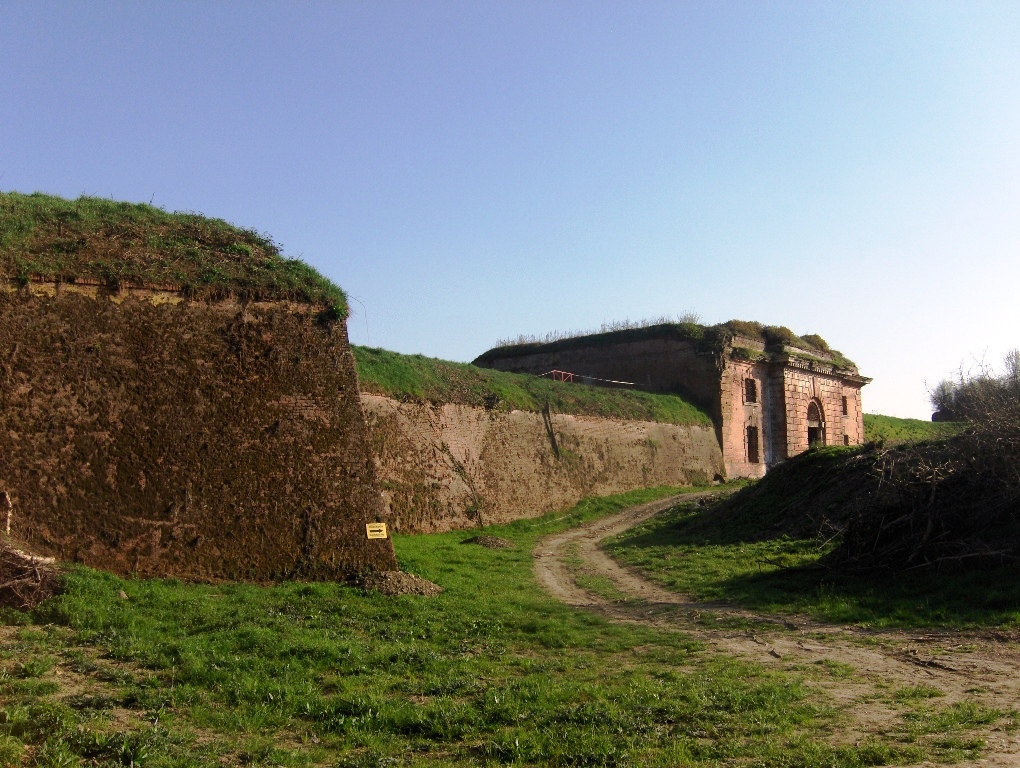
Secondary gate or Porta d'Asti

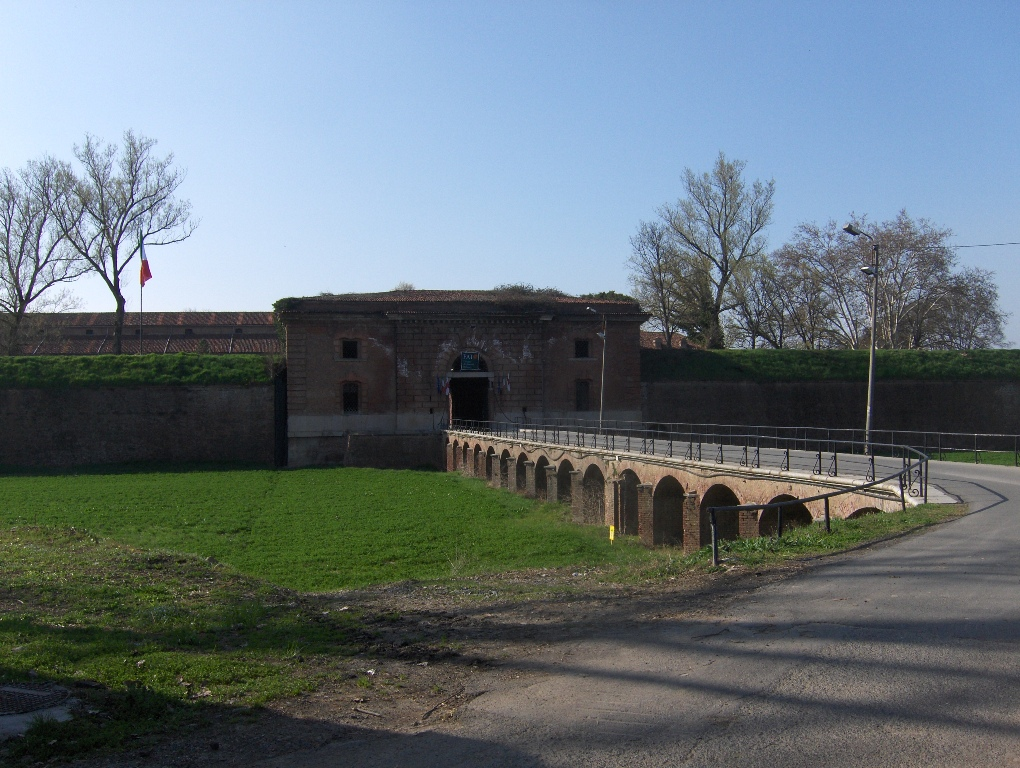
Main gate or Porta Reale

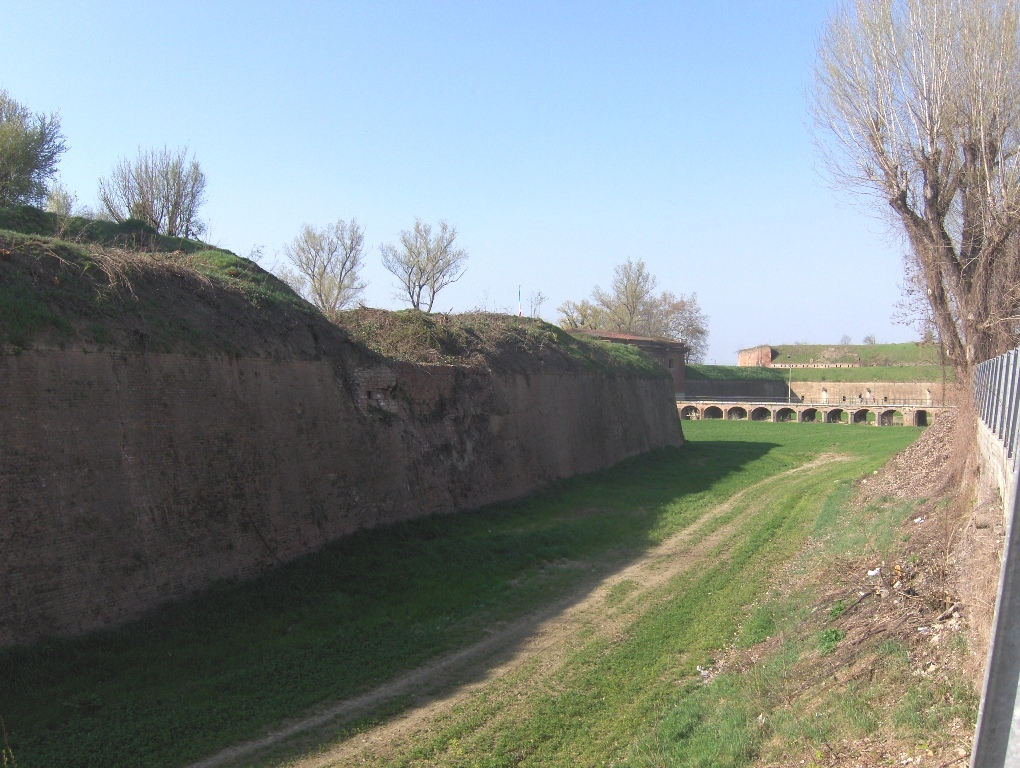
Wall

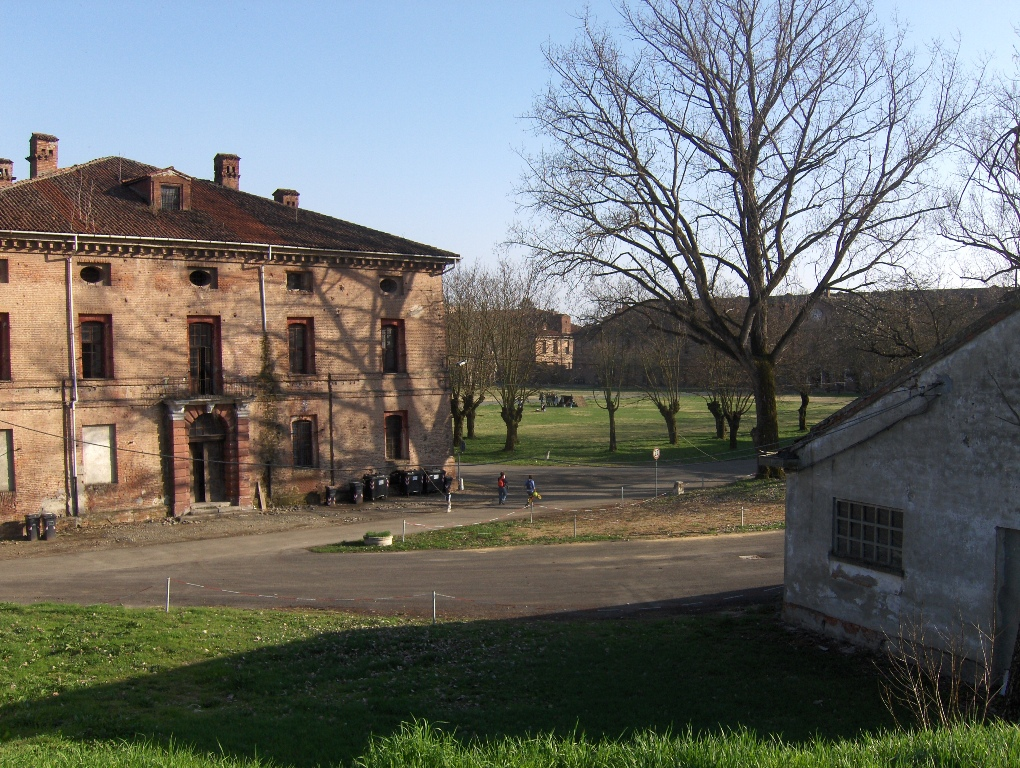
Interior of the citadel

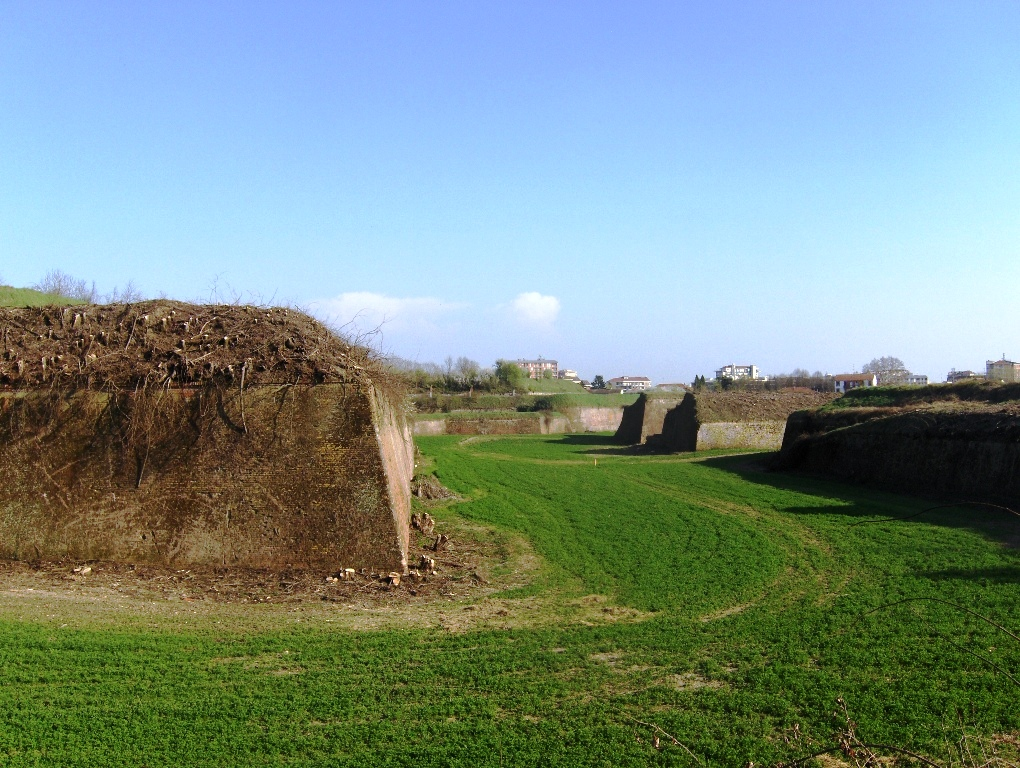
Bastions and walls

== See also ==
- Alessandria
- House of Savoy
- Ignazio Bertola

== Bibliography ==
- Anna Marotta, La Cittadella di Alessandria, una fortezza per il territorio dal settecento all'unità. SO.G.ED. 1991
