= Neopararhizobium haloflavum =

Scientific classification
- Domain: Bacteria
- Kingdom: Pseudomonadati
- Phylum: Pseudomonadota
- Class: Alphaproteobacteria
- Order: Hyphomicrobiales
- Family: Rhizobiaceae
- Genus: Neopararhizobium; Hördt et al. 2020
- Species: N. haloflavum

Binomial name
- Neopararhizobium haloflavum (Shen et al. 2018) Hördt et al. 2020

Type strain
- KCTC 52582; MCCC 1K03228; XC0140

Synonyms
- Pararhizobium haloflavum Shen et al. 2018

Species of bacteria

"Neopararhizobium haloflavum" is a species of bacteria from the family Rhizobiaceae.
