= Hoeflea =

Scientific classification
- Domain: Bacteria
- Kingdom: Pseudomonadati
- Phylum: Pseudomonadota
- Class: Alphaproteobacteria
- Order: Hyphomicrobiales
- Family: Rhizobiaceae
- Genus: Hoeflea; Peix et al. 2005

Type species
- Hoeflea marina

Species
- H. alexandrii Palacios et al. 2006; H. anabaenae Stevenson et al. 2011; H. halophila Jung et al. 2013; H. marina Peix et al. 2005; H. olei Rahul et al. 2015; H. phototrophica Biebl et al. 2006; "Hoeflea prorocentri" Yang et al. 2018; "Hoeflea siderophila" Sorokina et al. 2012

Genus of bacteria

Hoeflea is a genus of Gram-negative, strictly aerobic, oxidase- and catalase-positive, non-spore-forming, rod-shaped bacteria.
