= Forte Albertino =

19th-century Italian fort now serving as a museum

Coordinates: 44.3062°N 7.1725°E

- Forte di Vinadio (Italian)
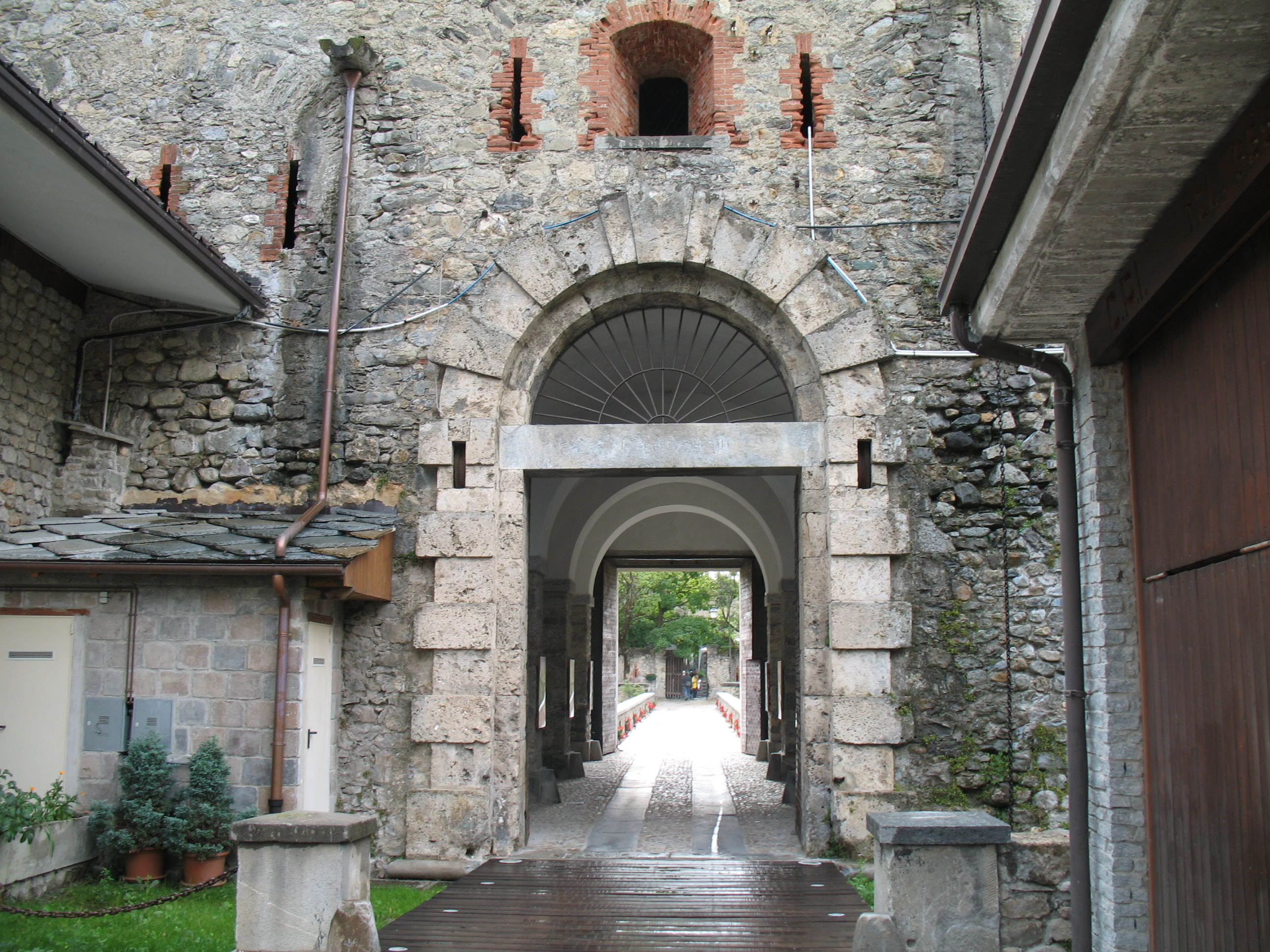
- Interactive map of the Forte Albertino area

General information
- Type: Fort
- Architectural style: Military
- Location: Vinadio, Piedmont, Italy
- Completed: 1847

Website
- www.fortedivinadio.com/en/

The Forte Albertino (also Forte di Vinadio) is an alpine fortress in Vinadio, Piedmont, northern Italy, located outside the town in the Stura di Demonte Valley. It is now used as a museum.

== History ==
Forte Albertino was commissioned in 1834 by Charles Albert of Savoy and, following a brief reprieve between 1837 and 1839, finished in 1847. The fort is placed strategically close to the French border and the Maddalena Pass, giving Italian troops control of who entered the country. An estimated 4,000 men helped erect the fort. Its walls have a length of about 1,200 metres (3,900 ft), with a total of 10 kilometres (6.2 mi) internal paths on three levels: the Upper Front, the Attack Front, and the Lower Front. The Upper and Lower Fronts consist of casements while the Attack Front had a ravelin and was the only point of access for communication with the outside world. This included communication with the town, Porta Francia, and the Pass.

The fort was never properly outfitted for war and was used as a prison for captured Garibaldini during the Battle of Aspromonte. After the dawn of the 20th century, Forte Albertino became a barracks, then an artillery warehouse. It was later bombed by the Allies during World War II and abandoned. It has since then been renovated and is now used as a museum.

== Permanent exhibitions ==
- Montagna in Movimento: Multimedia installations allow visitors to see the development, natural and otherwise, that built up Alps civilizations. The strategic value of the fort's location as well as ongoing environmental conservation and biodiversity efforts are highlighted.
- Messaggeri Alati: Located at Porta Neraissa, this exhibition details the history of the important military dovecote, which remained until 1944.
- Vinadio Virtual Reality: Introduced in 2017, the virtual reality exhibit gives visitors two options of fort exploration: the Vollo libero sul forte, a flight simulator, and Giallo Forte, a spy game.
- Mammamia che Forte!: This exhibition has offered a wide range of children's programming since its introduction in 2019.

== Gallery ==
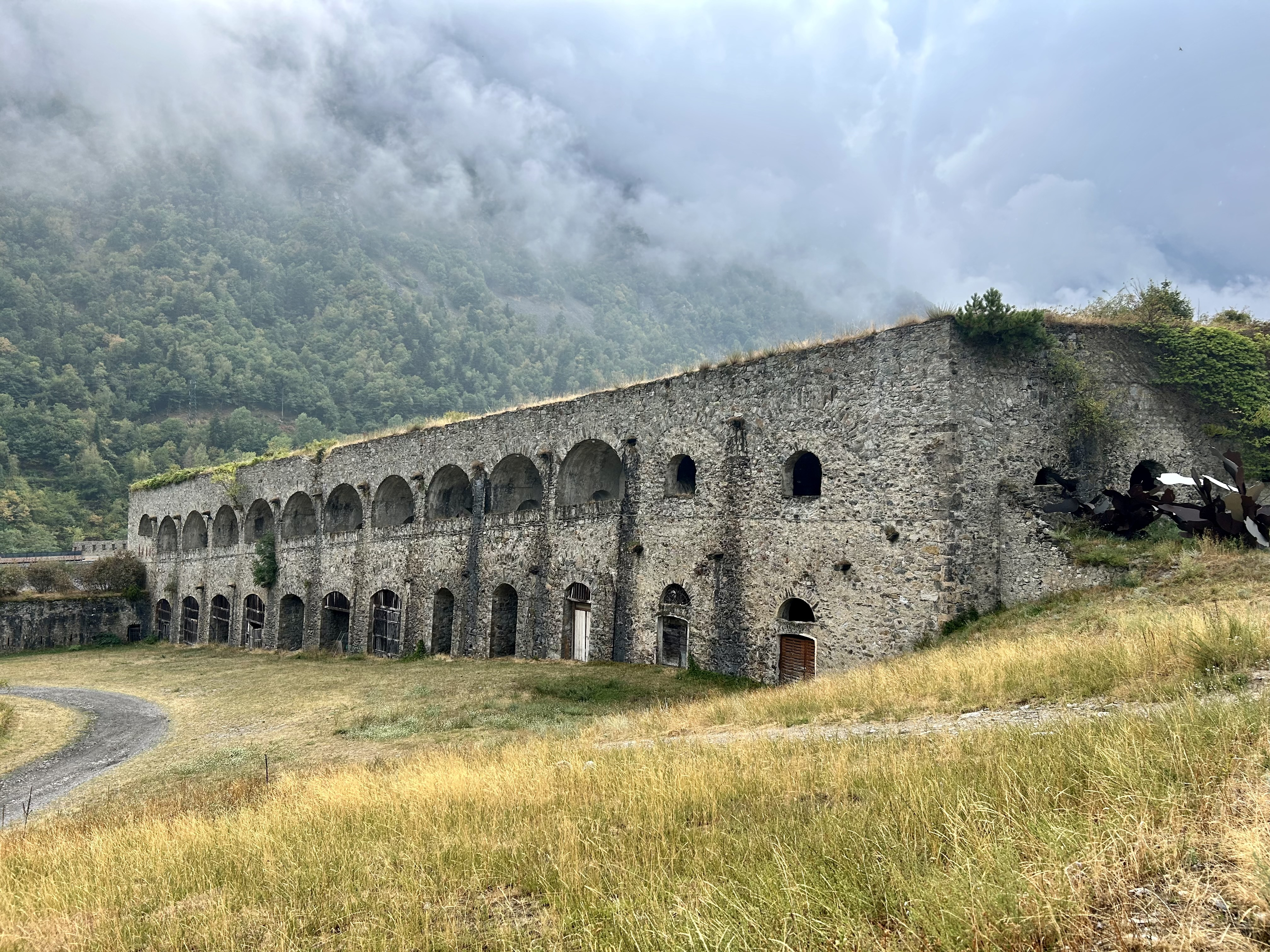

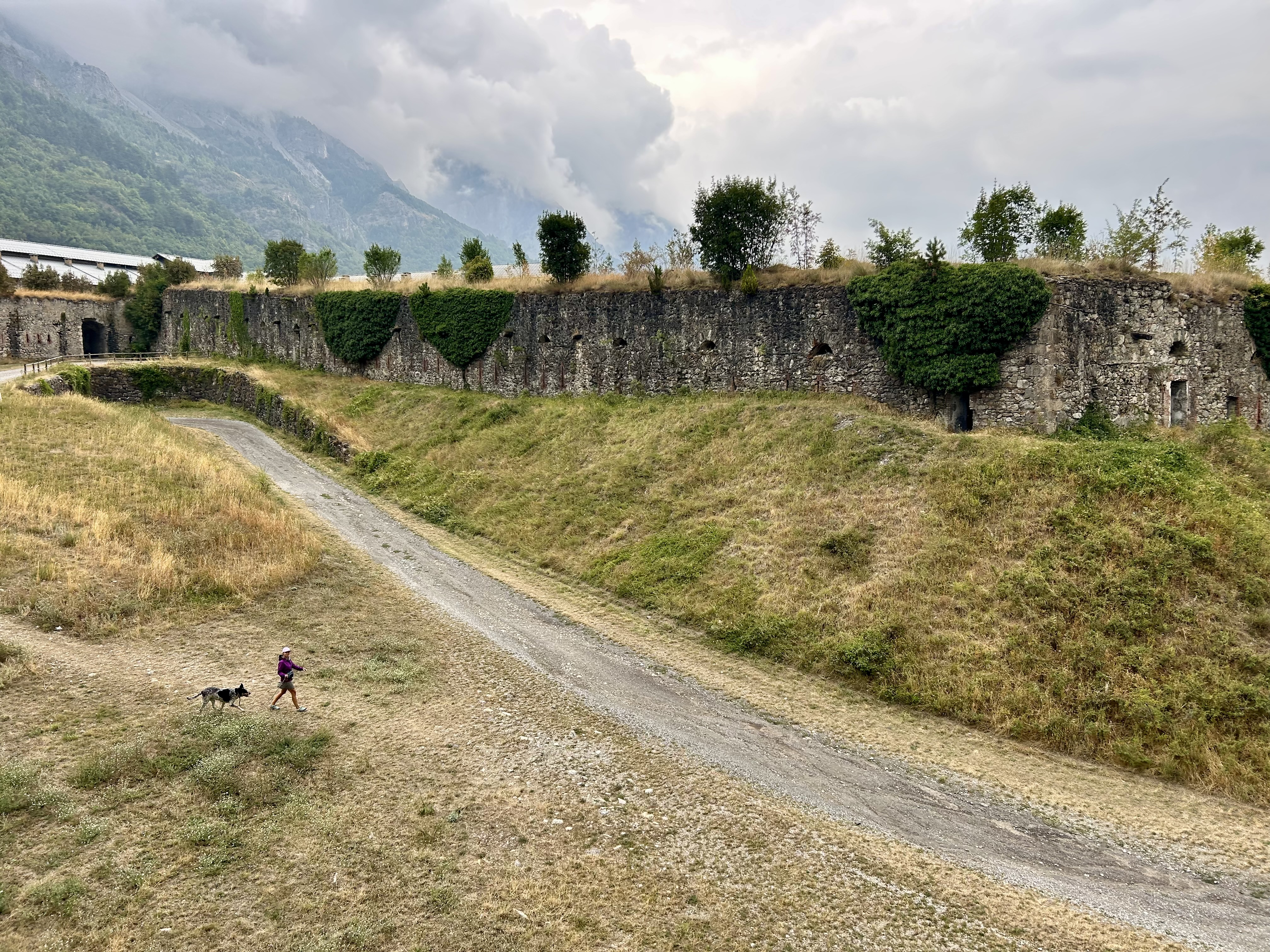

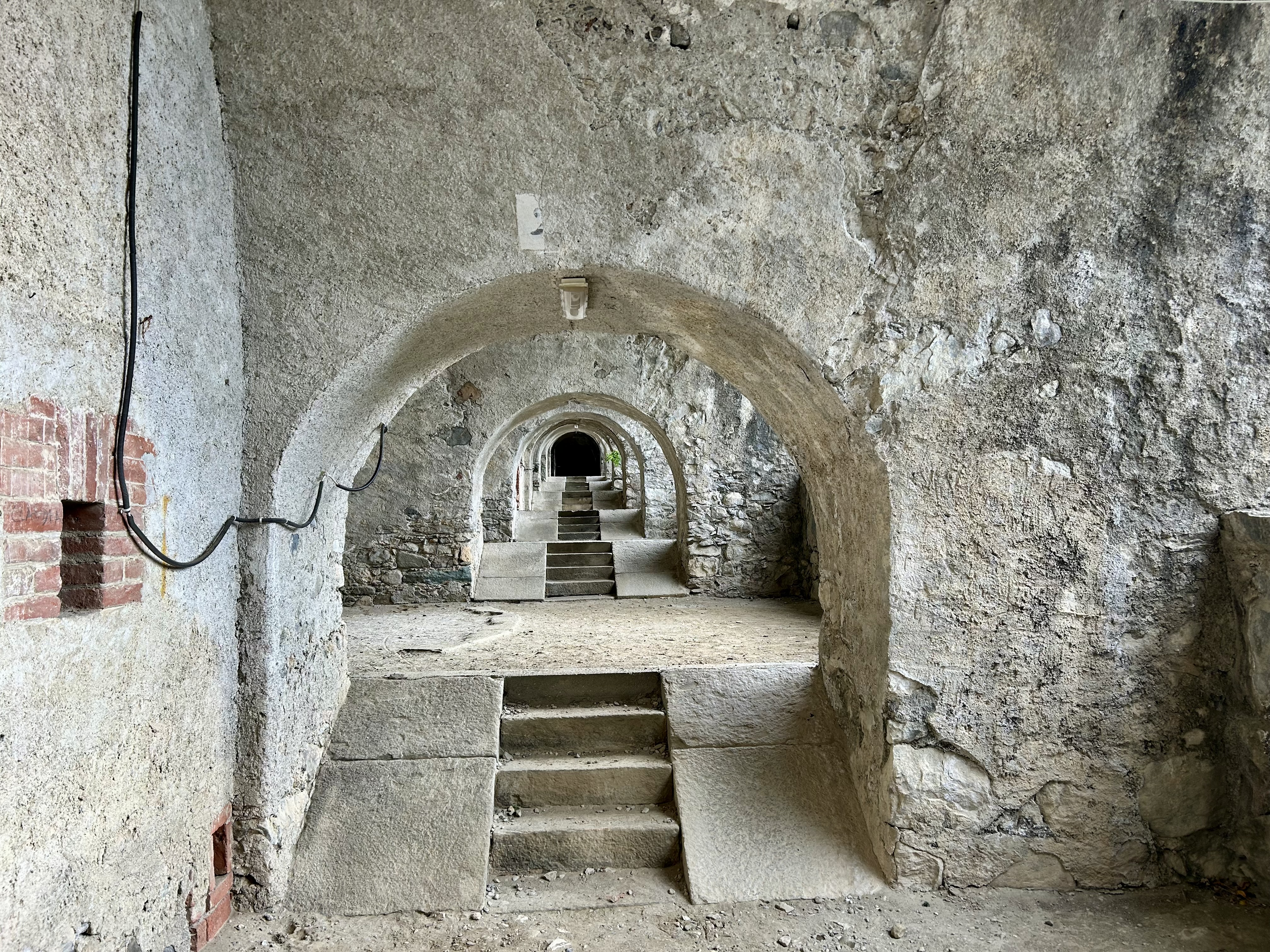

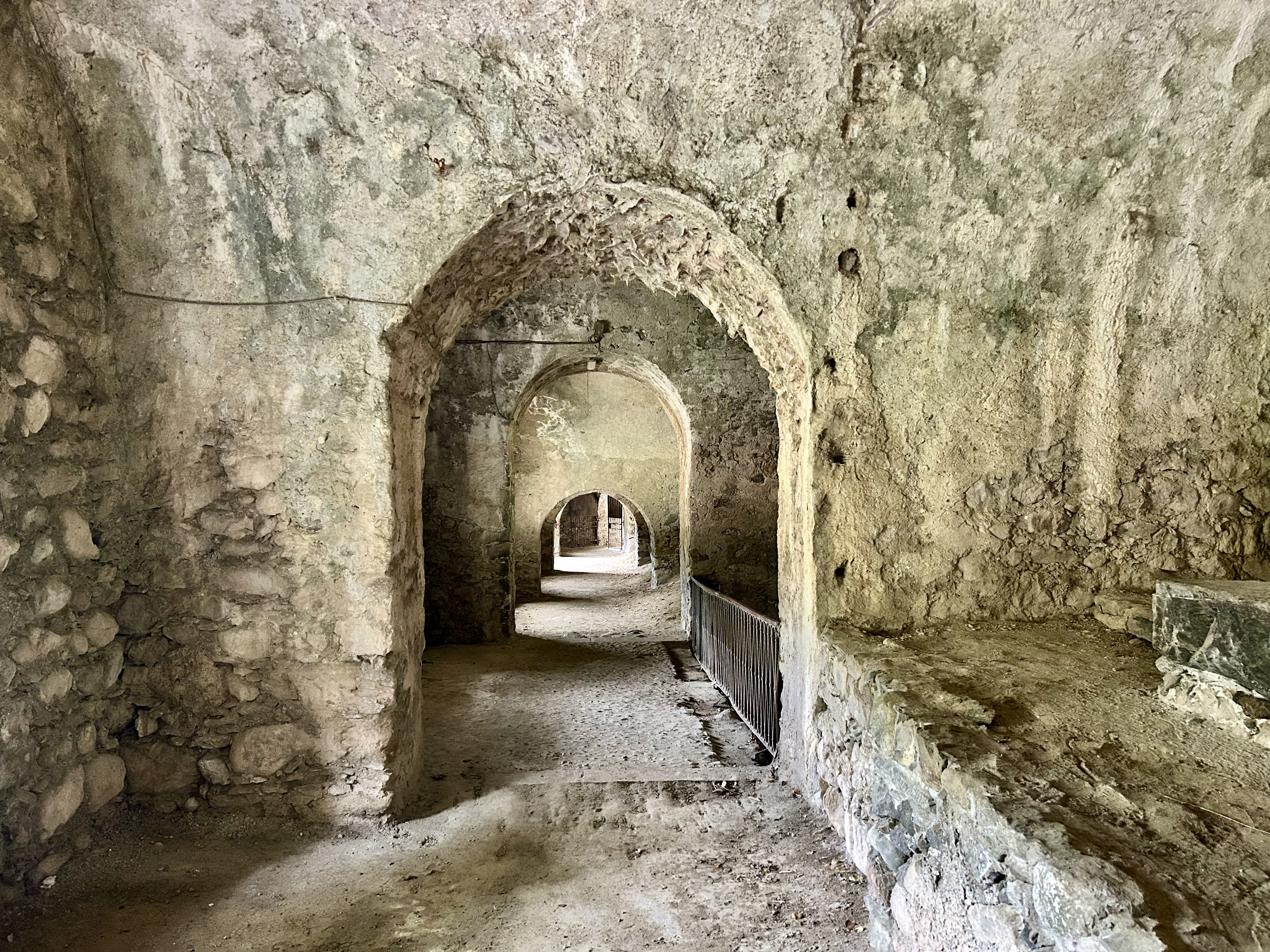
