= Peteryoungia =

Scientific classification
- Domain: Bacteria
- Kingdom: Pseudomonadati
- Phylum: Pseudomonadota
- Class: Alphaproteobacteria
- Order: Hyphomicrobiales
- Family: Rhizobiaceae
- Genus: Peteryoungia; Rahi et al. 2021

Type species
- Peteryoungia ipomoeae (Sheu et al. 2016) Rahi et al. 2021

Species
- Peteryoungia aggregata (Hirsch and Müller 1986) Kuzmanović et al. 2022; "Peteryoungia desertarenae" Rahi et al. 2021; Peteryoungia ipomoeae (Sheu et al. 2016) Rahi et al. 2021; "Peteryoungia rhizophila" (Gao et al. 2020) Rahi et al. 2021; "Peteryoungia rosettiformans" (Kaur et al. 2011) Rahi et al. 2021; "Peteryoungia wuzhouensis" (Yuan et al. 2018) Rahi et al. 2021

Genus of bacteria

Peteryoungia is a genus of bacteria from the family Rhizobiaceae.

== Phylogeny ==
The currently accepted taxonomy is based on the List of Prokaryotic names with Standing in Nomenclature (LPSN). The phylogeny is based on whole-genome analysis.

- - Peteryoungia
    - Peteryoungia desertarenae
    - - Peteryoungia ipomoeae
      - - - Peteryoungia wuzhouensis
          - Rhizobium glycinendophyticum
        - - Peteryoungia rosettiformans
          - - Agrobacterium albertimagni
            - Peteryoungia rhizophila
  - outgroups
    Peteryoungia
