= Lake Martel =

Glacial lake in Piedmont, Italy

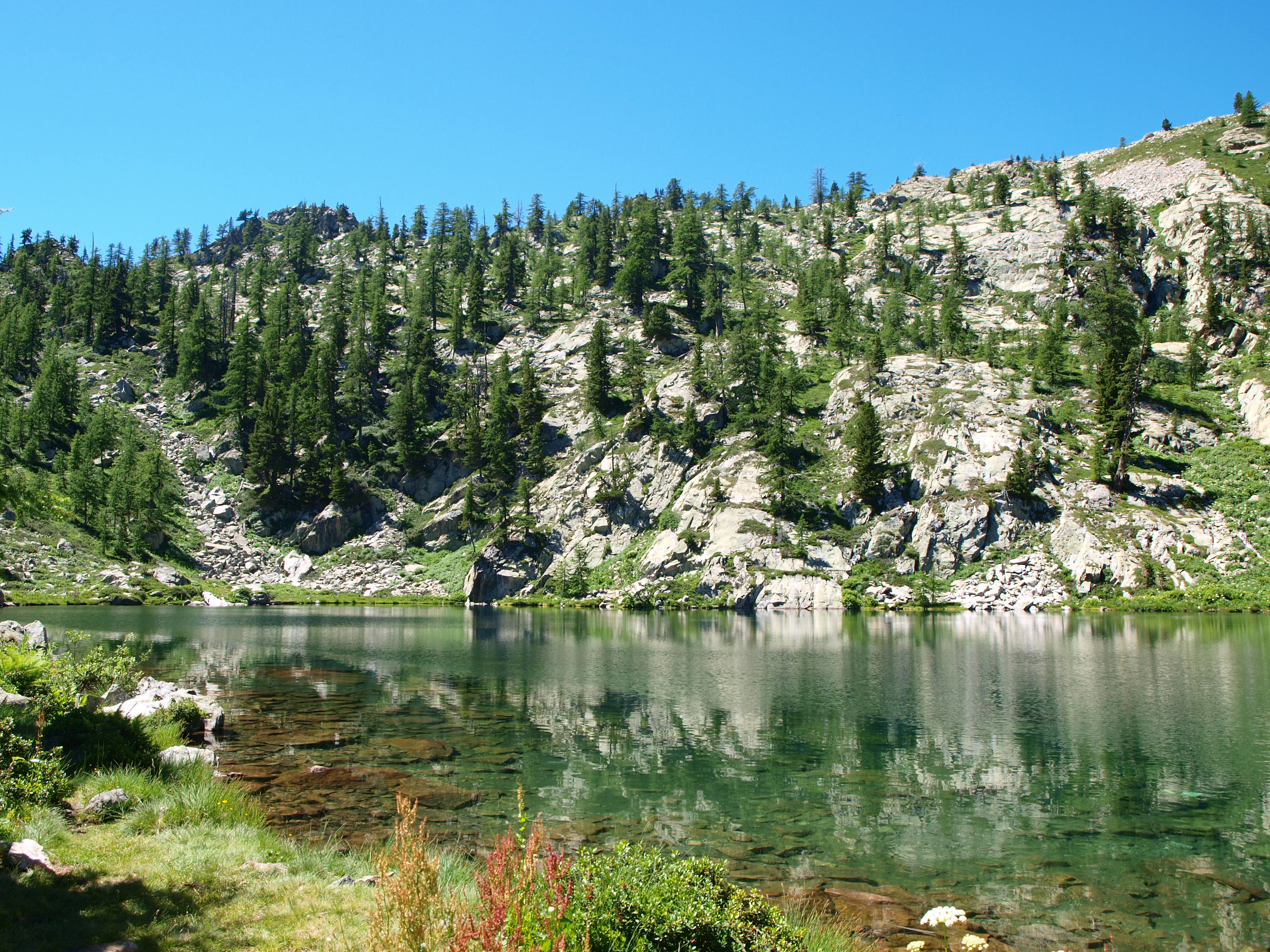
- Lake Martel

- Location of Lake Martel
- Location: Vinadio, Province of Cuneo, Piedmont, Italy
- Coordinates: 44.2379°N 7.1598°E
- Type: Glacial
- Primary inflows: None
- Primary outflows: Small underground stream
- Basin countries: Italy
- Surface area: 0.16 km^{2} (0.062 sq mi)
- Surface elevation: 2,166 m (7,106 ft)

The Lake Martel is located in the municipality of Vinadio, in the Province of Cuneo, in the upper Riofreddo valley. It is situated at 2,166 m above sea level and is a completely natural lake, formed due to glacial excavation. Surrounded by rocks typical of gneiss, belonging to the crystalline massif of Monte Argentera, it is located in the heart of the Maritime Alps.

== Access ==
After passing the village of Vinadio, proceed toward the Colle della Lombarda and, after a few switchbacks, follow the signs for Riofreddo. At this point, having passed the artificial reservoir, continue for about 2 kilometers until the end of the paved road, near a recently renovated mountain hut. Leaving the car, follow the path toward the Rifugio Malinvern and Lake Malinvern. Upon reaching the junction with signs for "Lake Martel and Lake Nero" (left bank), take the P15B trail, which is somewhat challenging and of medium difficulty. After about 2 hours and 30 minutes of walking, you reach the destination.

== Fauna ==
In the vicinity of the lake, specimens of ibex can be encountered, or more rarely, specimens of chamois.

The lake is primarily populated by the brown trout.

== Gallery ==
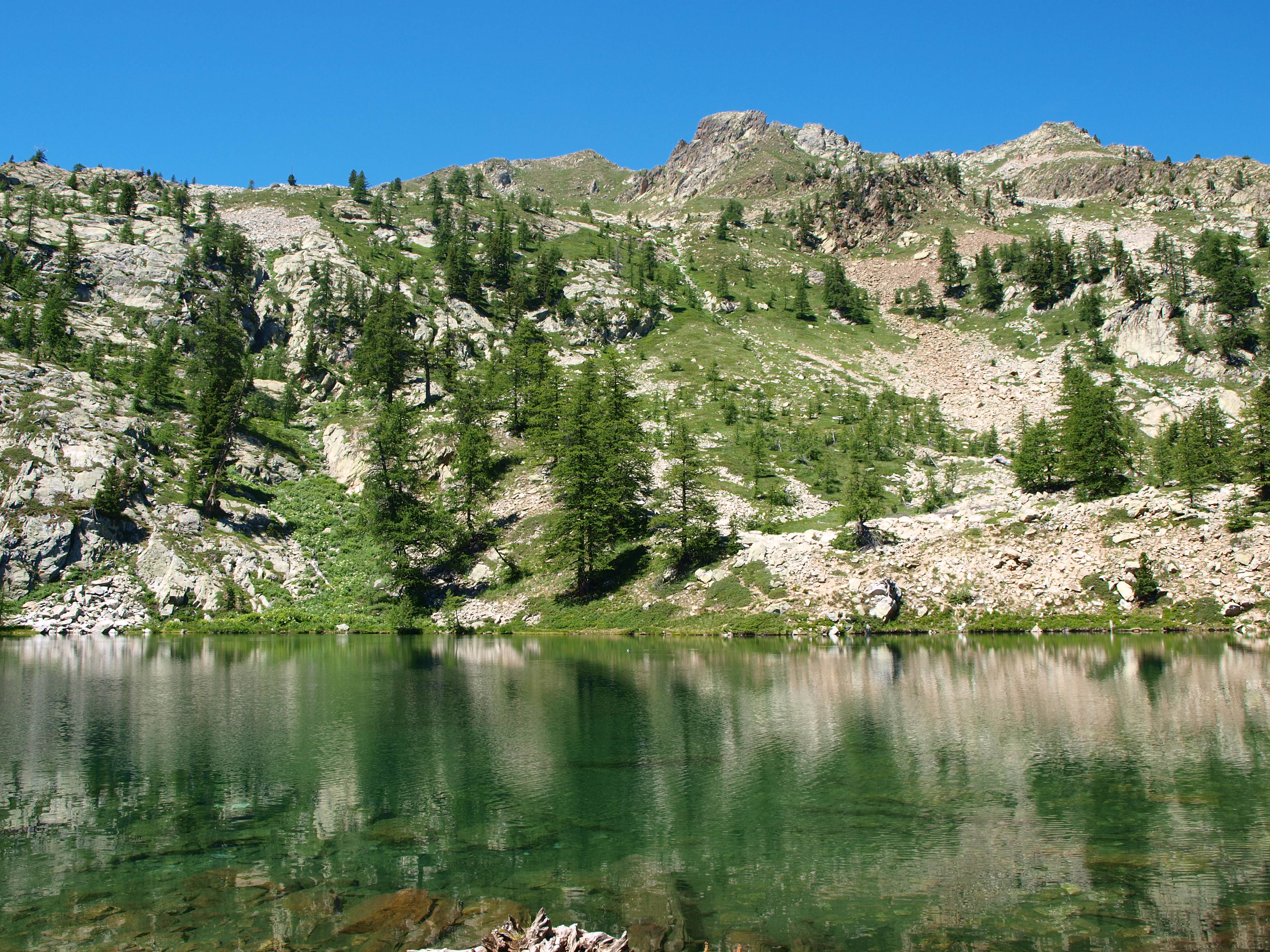
The lake

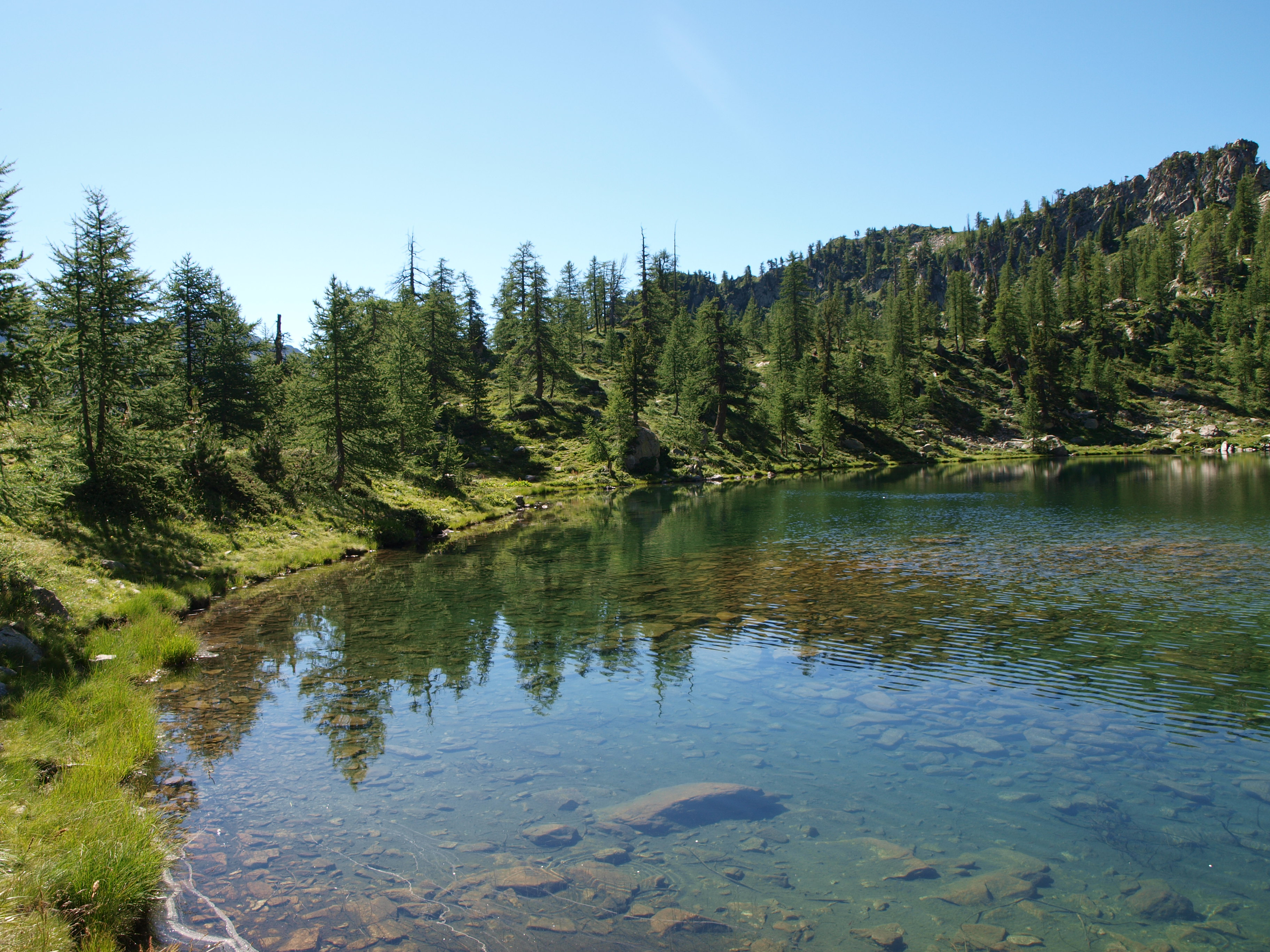
The lake

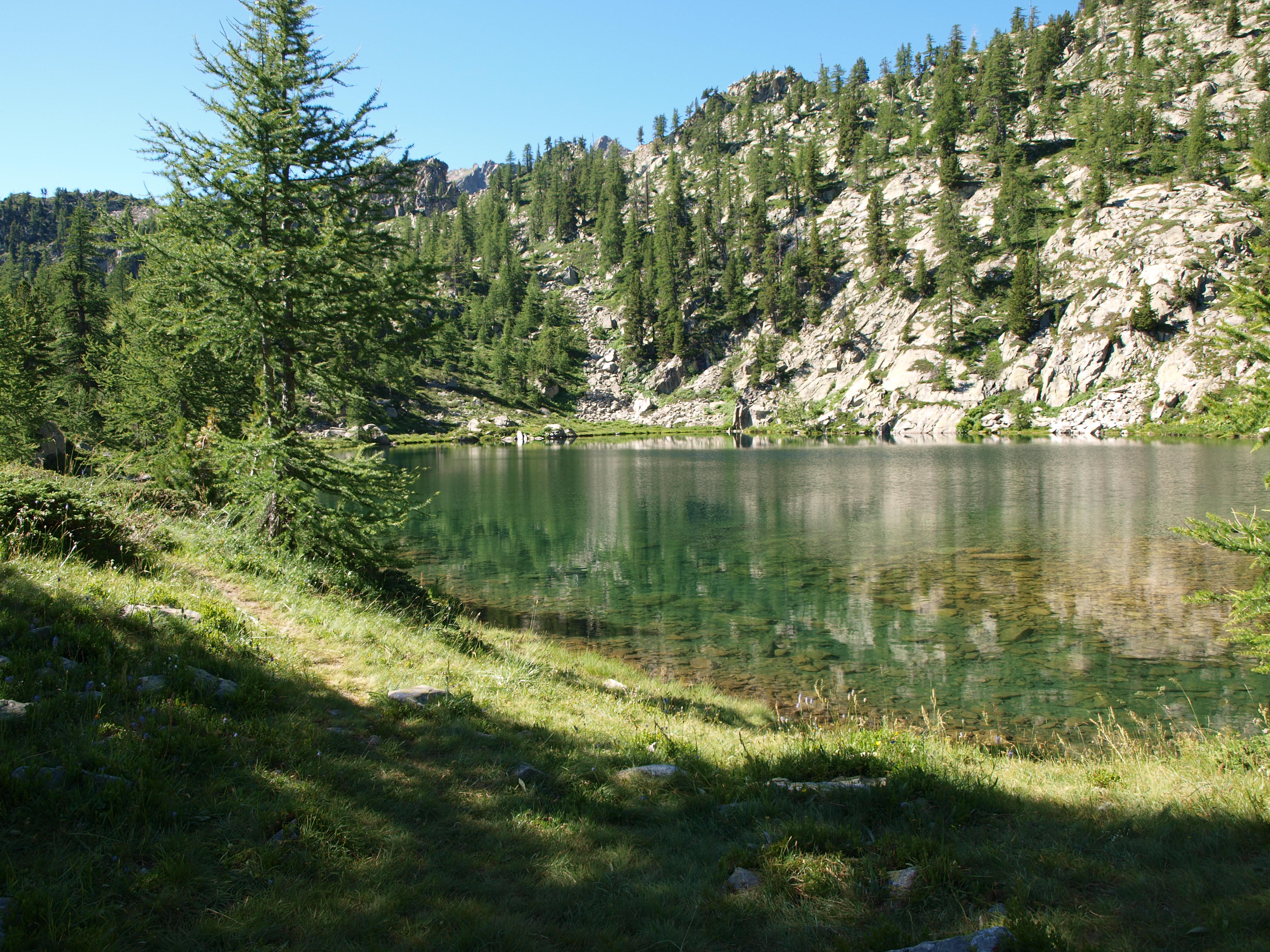
The lake

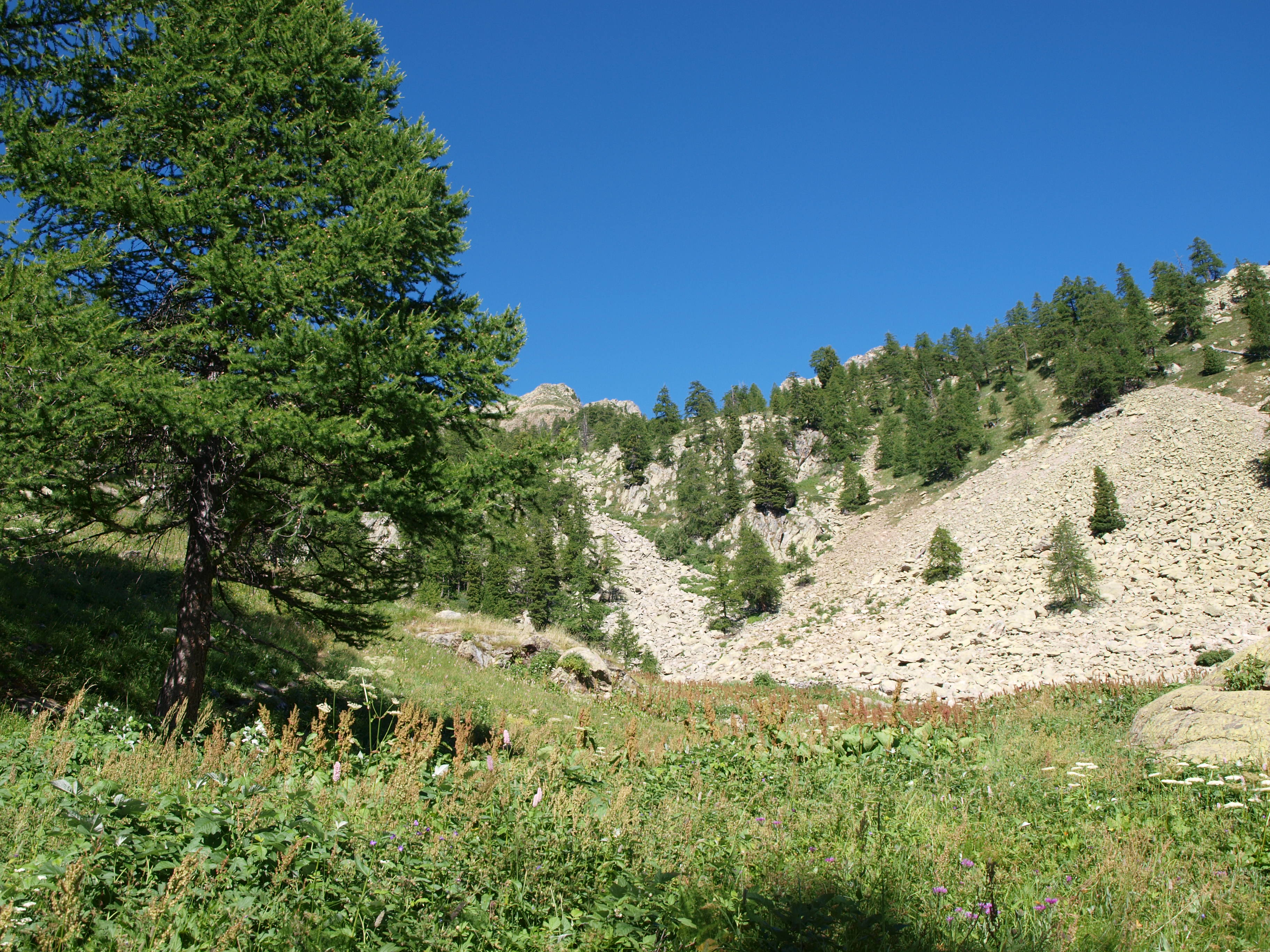
Along the trail

== Bibliography ==
- Mattio, Carlo A. I più bei sentieri della Provincia di Cuneo [The Most Beautiful Trails of the Province of Cuneo] (in Italian). Blu Edizioni.
- Guida dei sentieri alpini della Provincia di Cuneo (volume II) [Guide to the Alpine Trails of the Province of Cuneo (Volume II)] (in Italian). Provincia di Cuneo.
- Carta dei sentieri e dei rifugi 1:25.000 [Map of Trails and Refuges 1:25,000] (in Italian). Istituto Geografico Centrale.
- Maggio, Marcello. Anelli di montagna [Mountain Loops] (in Italian). Primalpe.
