= Ignazio Bertola =

Italian military architect (1676–1755)

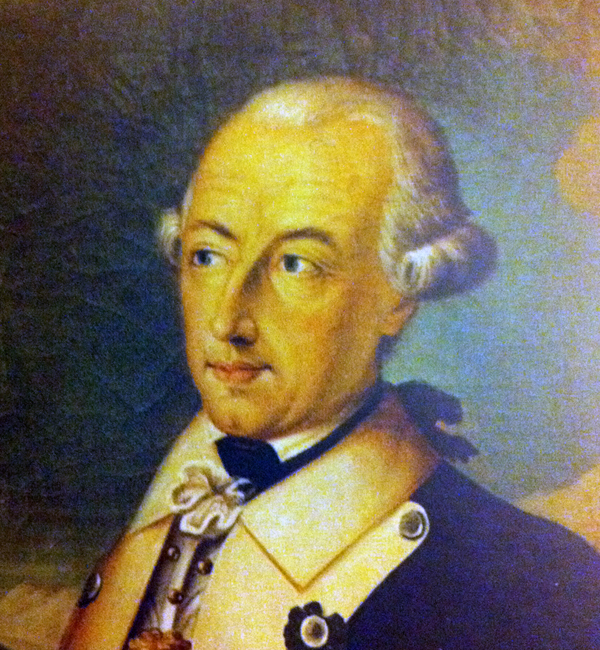
Count Giuseppe Francesco Ignazio Bertola

Giuseppe Francesco Ignazio Bertola born Roveda was an Italian military architect.

== Biography ==
Born in 1676 in Tortona, Ignazio was the adopted son of the architect Antonio Bertola and followed in his footsteps as a military engineer.

In 1720 he was commissioned to build or renovate the new defensive system of the Duchy of Savoy whose necessity had emerged after the Treaty of Utrecht.This work ended six years later, getting the approval of the military experts of the time. He made works of civil and military engineering in Alessandria and in Fenestrelle and built the so-called "road of the guns", a trail between the valleys Varaita and Maira.

He held the office of Master of Fortresses and then First Engineer of Her Majesty.

He was the first director of the "School of Theory and Practice of Artillery of Piedmont", which was founded in 1736. In 1742 he was appointed count of Exilles by Charles Emmanuel III of Savoy.

Bertola died in Turin in 1755.
