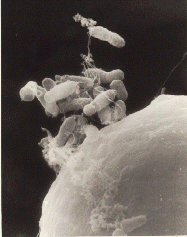
- Agrobacterium tumefaciens as it begins to infect a carrot cell

Scientific classification
- Domain: Bacteria
- Kingdom: Pseudomonadati
- Phylum: Pseudomonadota
- Class: Alphaproteobacteria
- Order: Hyphomicrobiales
- Family: Rhizobiaceae; Conn 1938

Genera
- See text

= Rhizobiaceae =

Family of bacteria

The Rhizobiaceae is a family of Pseudomonadota comprising multiple subgroups that enhance and hinder plant development. Some bacteria found in the family are used for plant nutrition and collectively make up the rhizobia. Other bacteria such as Agrobacterium tumefaciens and Rhizobium rhizogenes severely alter the development of plants in their ability to induce crown galls or hairy roots, respectively. The family has been of an interest to scientists for centuries in their ability to associate with plants and modify plant development. The Rhizobiaceae are, like all Pseudomonadota, Gram-negative. They are aerobic, and the cells are usually rod-shaped. Many species of the Rhizobiaceae are diazotrophs which are able to fix nitrogen and are symbiotic with plant roots.

== Genera ==
Rhizobiaceae comprises the following genera:

- Agrobacterium Conn 1942 (Approved Lists 1980)
- Allorhizobium de Lajudie et al. 1998
- Ciceribacter Kathiravan et al. 2013
- Endobacterium Menéndez et al. 2021
- Ensifer Casida 1982
- Ferirhizobium corrig. Romanenko et al. 2024
- Gellertiella Tóth et al. 2017
- Georhizobium Cao et al. 2020
- Hoeflea Peix et al. 2005
- Lentilitoribacter Park et al. 2013
- Liberibacter Fagen et al. 2014
- Martelella Rivas et al. 2005
- Mycoplana Gray and Thornton 1928 (Approved Lists 1980)
- "Neopararhizobium" Hördt et al. 2020
- Neorhizobium Mousavi et al. 2015
- "Onobrychidicola" Ashrafi et al. 2022
- Pararhizobium Mousavi et al. 2016
- Peteryoungia Rahi et al. 2021
- Pseudorhizobium Kimes et al. 2017
- Rhizobium Frank 1889 (Approved Lists 1980)
- Shinella An et al. 2006
- Sinorhizobium Chen et al. 1988
- Xaviernesmea Kuzmanović et al. 2022

== Phylogeny ==
The currently accepted taxonomy is based on the List of Prokaryotic names with Standing in Nomenclature (LPSN). The phylogeny is based on whole-genome analysis.

- - Rhizobiaceae
    - - "Neopararhizobium"
      - - Lentilitoribacter
        - Hoeflea
    - - - Liberibacter
        - - Martelella
          - Shinella
      - - - - Mycoplana
            - Gellertiella
          - - - Ensifer
              - Sinorhizobium
            - Pararhizobium
        - - Rhizobium
          - - - Allorhizobium
              - Ciceribacter
            - - Agrobacterium
              - - Pseudorhizobium
                - Neorhizobium
  - outgroup
    Phyllobacteriaceae
