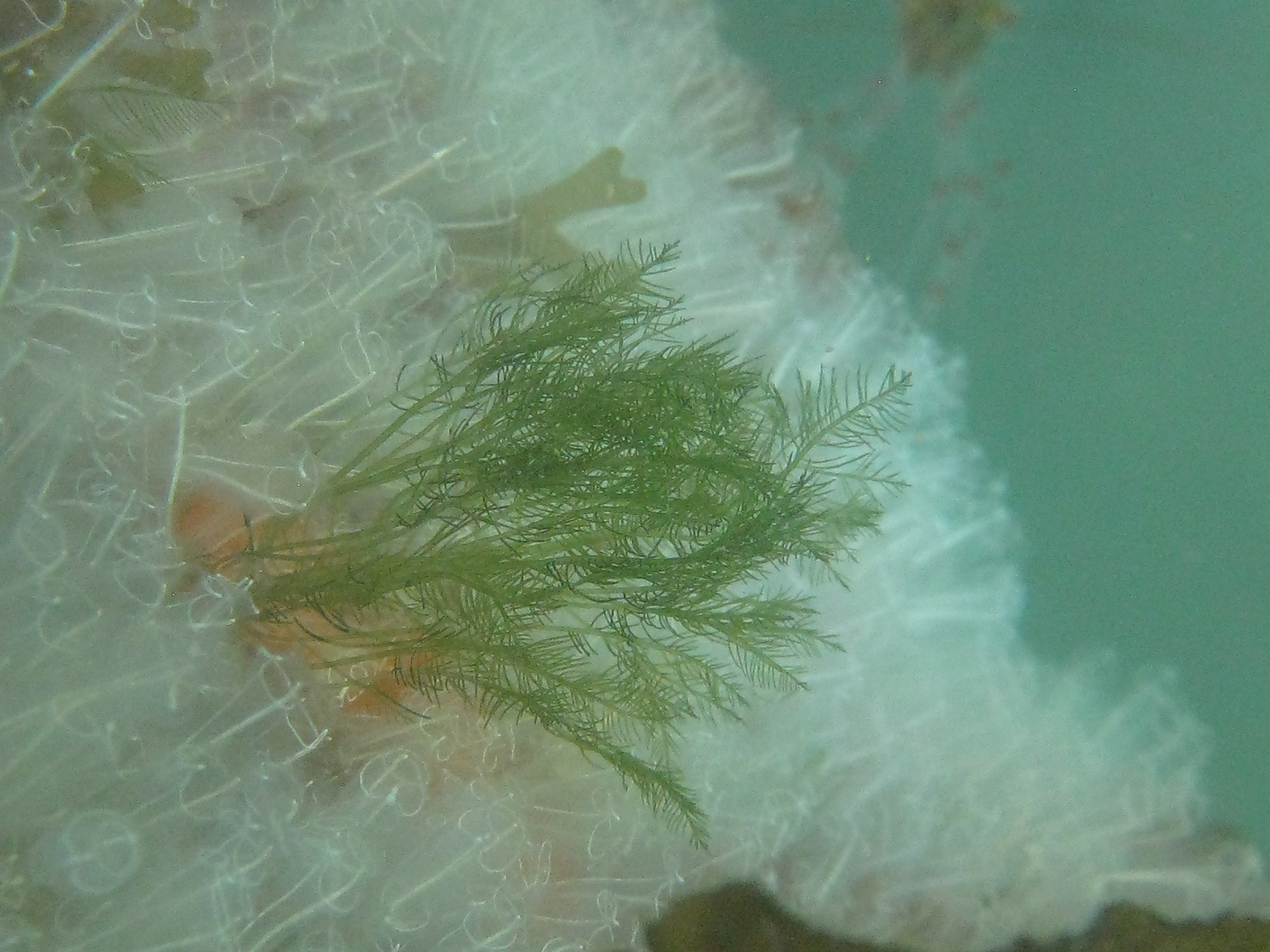
- Bryopsis plumosa

Scientific classification
- Kingdom: Plantae
- Division: Chlorophyta
- Class: Ulvophyceae
- Order: Bryopsidales
- Family: Bryopsidaceae
- Genus: Bryopsis; J.V. Lamouroux, 1809

Species
- See text

= Bryopsis =

Genus of algae

Bryopsis, often referred to as hair algae, is a genus of marine green algae in the family Bryopsidaceae. Species in the genus are macroscopic, siphonous marine green algae that are made up of units of single tubular filaments. They can form dense tufts up to 40 cm in height. Each cell is made of up an erect thallus that is often branched into pinnules. Approximately 60 species have been identified in this genus since its initial discovery in 1809. The ecological success of Bryopsis has also been attributed to its associations with endophytic bacteria that reside in the cytoplasm of their cells.

Species in this genus are known to be pests in aquariums and associated with green tides due to macroalgal blooms. However, Bryopsis also contains unique chemical properties, most notably, Kahalalide F (KF), a depsipeptide that is being studied for its antitumor properties in human cancer cells and also has important ecological significance in protecting the algae against herbivory. The removal of algal blooms for the extraction of KF may be a pragmatic approach to eradicating Bryopsis from green tides and aiding the economic burden of producing KF experimentally for clinical trials.

== Morphology and cell biology ==
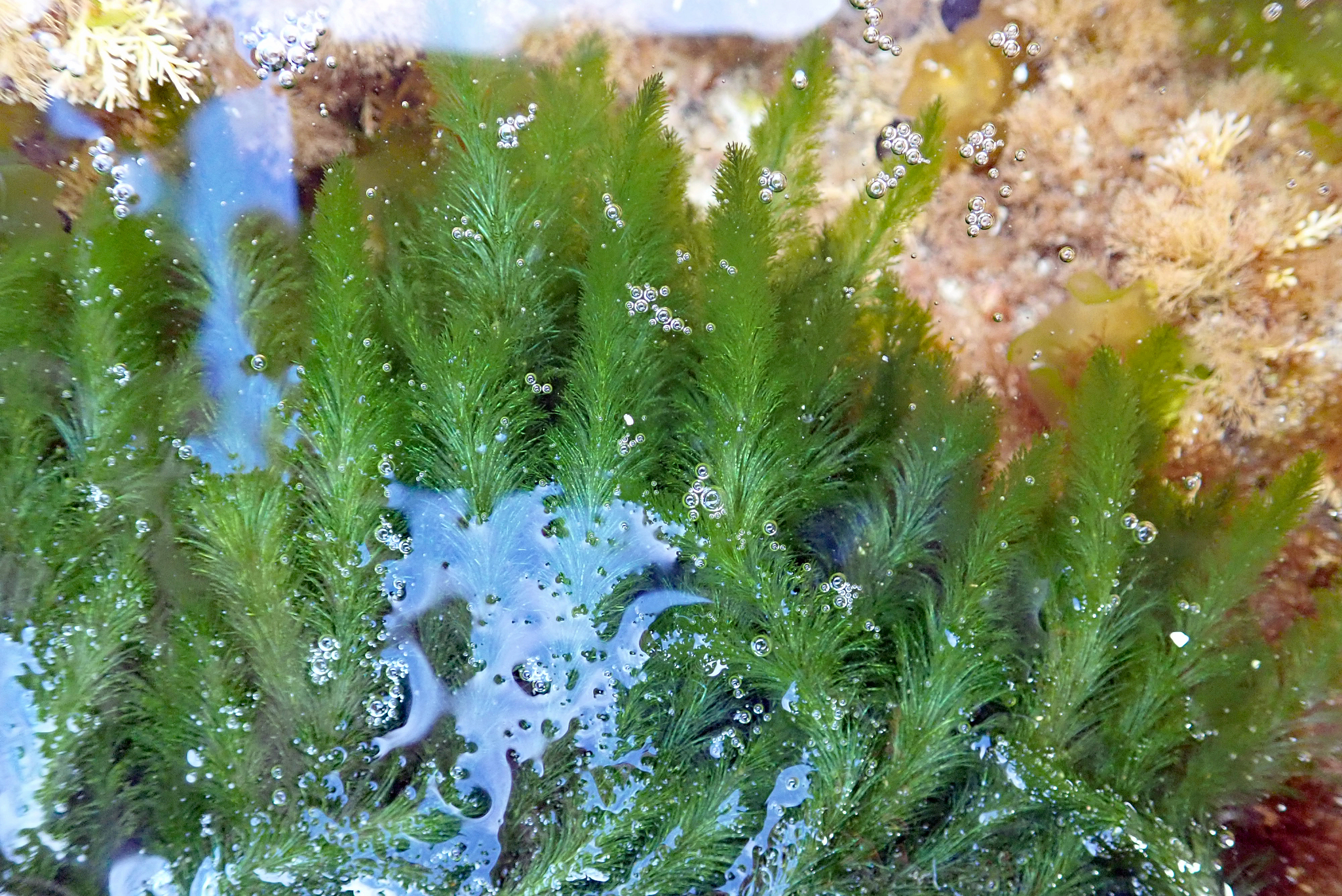
Bryopsis vestita

Bryopsis is a filamentous green alga that can forms dense tufts between 2 – 40 cm tall. It tends to have a morphology that is simple, non-calcified and siphonous multinucleate filaments with no cross walls, with axes that are erect and uniaxial. Its fronds are feather-like, extended with prostate axes. Organisms are single tubular cells that are siphonous, which is a term used to describe algae in which the thallus is not compartmentalized and typically contains a large vacuole surrounded by an outer later of protoplasm. The nuclei and chloroplasts reside in the thallus and line the cell wall. When extruded, the protoplasm can survive without a cell membrane for several minutes before regenerating into mature individual units. The thallus is commonly erect and occurs in two morphologies corresponding to haploid or diploid life cycle stages: the macrothallus and microthallus. The growth of the macrothallus is indeterminate, while the microthallus is often determinate. The fronds of Bryopsis vary among species from deltoid to lanceolate and the pinnules are most commonly in radial, distichous or secund arrangements.

Previous research on the morphology of this genus has correlated the wall structure with the cell shape of Bryopsis. The cell walls are tough yet flexible. The main components of the cell wall are mannan, cellulose and xylan. Its meristematic activity is conveniently differentiated from the typical mechanism in that it is free of cross-walls, is not covered by mature laterals and its laterals all lie in the same plane, so new mass is added to the inner surface of the growing walls from transverse microfibrils. The apical development and arrangement of transverse microfibrils play an important role in the lateral and longitudinal growth of the cell wall structure.

The chloroplast is the largest organelle in the cell of Bryopsis. Its relative vitality compared to other organelles in unfavourable conditions and its ability to photosynthesize and lodge in other cells demonstrates its high level of autonomy relative to other organelles. The chloroplast is also thought to have an important role in protoplast regeneration. The literature suggests that the fast rate of repair to photosystem II and transient photoinactivation are mechanisms that this genus uses to help mitigate photodamage from excess sun light. The siphonous morphology of Bryopsis also plays an important role in adapting to changing light conditions on the intertidal shores; affecting light-harvesting modulation in some species of this genus. Some species of Bryopsis have a protective state in which their bodies discriminate between surface filaments that get high exposure to the sun from those that reside in underlayers.

Bryopsis is a unicellular coenocytic cell. In the macrothallus, nuclei are approximately 25 μm in diameter, while in the microthallus the primary nucleus can be up to 60 μm. The nucleolus of the primary nucleus is spherical and around 20 μm in diameter. In many species of this genus, it has been observed that nuclear volume is not related to nuclear DNA content. In the sporophyte stage, the nucleus is 10 μm diameter. Once the nucleus of the sporophyte reaches a sufficient size, it will start to divide, resulting in a multinucleated sporophyte. This arrangement is aided by centrioles which help to separate the chromosomes and split the nucleus into two daughter nuclei. After the first division, the nucleus of the sporophyte is the same size the nuclei in the mature macrothallus. The subsequent division of the cytoplasm results in uninucleate masses of protoplasm.

== Life cycle ==
The life history patterns of Bryopsis are highly variable, potentially the most diverse among any genus of green algae. Bryopsis have highly variable life history patterns, even within species. The life cycle of Bryopsis has two stages alternating between an erect macroscopic stage which form macrothalli and a small branched phase which form microthalli. Macrothalli are haploid while microthalli are diploid. Haploid macrothalli may either produce gametes that will then fuse to make a zygote and then a sporophyte (microthallus), or they may produce microthalli at the tips of fronds whose cytoplasms are always kept separate from that of the "mother" organism, the macrothallus. In this specialized region, diploid and haploid nuclei can both be found, but the exact mechanism of diploidization is poorly understood. This means that in Bryopsis diploidization to produce microthalli is not dependent on syngamy, it can happen within the macrothallus. This can be disadvantageous due to the loss of genetic exchange, but it is advantageous because the direct development of microthalli does not depend on mating so new microthalli can be produced relatively quickly. Microthalli formed in this way then detach from the gametophyte to form separate sporophytes. Macrothalli develop either directly from microthalli, or through stephanokontic zoospores which form from them.

Stephanokontic zoospores are flagellated cells that develop into gametophytes upon attachment to substrate. Stephanokontic zoospores in the life cycles of Bryopsis have been observed in many species. However, some species within Bryopsis do not have stephanokonic zoospores and produce macrothalli directly from microthalli. Both methods of development can occur within one species, as observed in B. plumosa. The timing of meiosis in Bryopsis is not well understood.

In vitro cultivation of Bryopsis hypnoides has revealed new information that is important in its regeneration. In environments where conditions are suboptimal, organelle aggregation among B. hypnoides was found to be a possible response to survive.

== Distribution ==
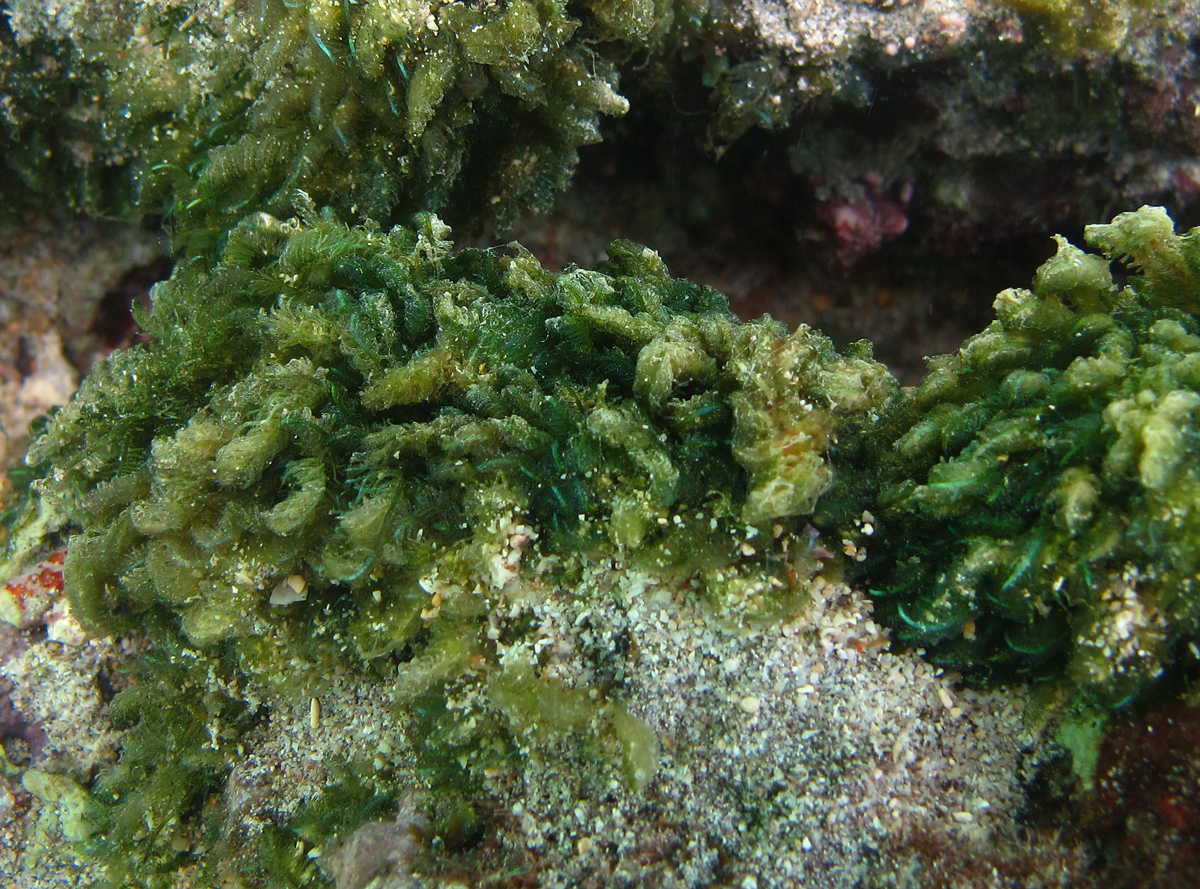
Bryopsis cf. pennata at Réunion

Bryopsis contains mostly epilithic but sometimes free-floating algae that occupy a range of habitats including seaweed beds, shallow fringing reefs and both sheltered and well-exposed subtidal areas. Bryopsis is widely distributed in tropical and subtropical areas and dominant in eutrophic coastal regions. B. pennata, B. hyponoides and B. plumosa are among the most common cosmopolitan species within this genus. In addition to having a wide distribution, this genus can have a high species density. For example, in Singapore it represents one of the four functional-form groups that makes up approximately 20-40% of benthic cover across coral reefs and along the east coast of the United States and the Caribbean, where clusters of species from this genus dominate intertidal regions. A majority of the species tend to inhabit marine ecosystems with temperatures that range from 5 to 27 degrees celsius, among coral reefs and near the shore, associated to rocky substrates however, some may also inhabit mangrove areas, estuaries, and other brackish systems.

Bryopsis is widely distributed along tropical, subtropical, and temperate coastal regions and thrives in eutrophic waters. Bryopsis can be epilithic or free-floating. Climate warming and pollution are factors that are thought to contribute to its increased presence over the past few years. The genus is also widely distributed in Brazil, with studies spanning from the late 1800 to 2015.

== Ecology ==
Bryopsis are regarded to have ecological significance as primary producers, also as refuge for other marine organisms. It may also be possible that some species within the genus are invasive in nature, seeing how it thrives in eutrophic conditions. They may function as bioindicators.

=== Herbivory ===
For benthic organisms like Bryopsis, herbivory is an important factor influencing species density and mortality. Chemically mediated predator-prey interactions such as the production of kahalalide F (KF), helps protect Bryopsis from herbivory. However, Sacoglossans are an exception, they are a type of opisthobranch mollusk that eat siphonaceous green algae. They are highly specialized herbivores that sequester chloroplasts and other secondary metabolites from their diet has a source of photosynthetic energy. The literature has demonstrated that both Bryopsis and the mollusks that feed on it are protected from fish predation due to the presence of KF. The sequestration of secondary metabolites such as KF provides the mollusks a diet-derived chemical defense against predation. Therefore, Bryopsis has an influential role on the ecology and evolution of mollusk species that feed on it.

=== Competitive interactions with coral reefs ===
Globally, coral reef ecosystems are degrading due to anthropogenic effects such as pollution and climate change. The proliferation of Bryopsis has also influenced the dramatic decline in coral reefs by limiting survivorship and potentially constrain recovery of degrading reefs. The larvae of coral are vulnerable to competition with macroalgae. Bryopsis reduces survivorship of coral larvae through allelopathic effects, occupying large amounts of geographical space, and destabilizing coral microbiomes. Increasing concentrations of allelochemicals produced by Bryopsis results in increased larval mortality rates. These effects extend beyond the duration of chemical exposure because even when no traces remained, the mortality rate of coral larvae continued to increase in experimental conditions.

Hypoxia may be another factor that contributes to the competitive interactions between coral and macroalgae. Bryopsis is tolerant to low oxygen concentration environments that were detrimental to coral species. Additionally, the coral skeleton that remains after tissue degradation optimizes colonization by microalgae, which attach to the exposed hard substrate. Therefore, the recovery of degrading coral reefs containing macroalgae may be negatively affected due to Bryopsis' wider range of tolerance for suboptimal conditions and its allelopathic effects on the survivorship and settlement of coral larvae.

=== Green tides ===
Algal blooms occur in various coastal regions worldwide. Bryopsis is one of the main genera of macroalgae contributing to this. Microbes break down the macroalgae that accumulate in the ocean and intertidal regions. The decomposition of algae causes oxygen shortages and hypoxic or anoxic, lethal environments for other organisms. This could have serious effects on the ecosystem. Rising sea water temperatures and eutrophication are thought to be major factors responsible for the development of green tides. Bryopsis micro-propagules in the form of gametes, spores and zygotes attach to existing mature thalli or seaweed beds and this initiates the green tides. Algal blooms could have significant ecological repercussions if they are not contained due to their potentially harmful effects on other organisms.

=== Bacterial associations ===
Bacterial associations with marine macroalgae are common. They are often found on the surface and in the cytoplasm or vacuoles of the cells and can influence the life cycle as well as different metabolic functions such as growth factors, and the fixation of nitrogen and antimicrobial compounds of the macroalgae. Bacteria-like particles have been identified in the cytoplasm of the thalli and gametes of Bryopsis. The latter supports the theory of vertical transmission of endophytic bacteria, implying a stable and mutualistic relationship between the host and its endobionts. Bryopsis is thought to have intrinsic mechanisms that are highly selective for specific bacteria despite being exposed to a wide range of marine bacteria. The functionality of the presence of these endosymbionts is not well known however, they are thought to provide the algae an adaptive advantage. A strong host specific association between Flavobacteriaceae endosymbionts and Bryopsis has been cited in literature to aid nitrogen fixation in the algae. Generalist phylotypes fulfill metabolic functions such as nitrogen-fixation (Rhizobiaceae), anoxygenic photosynthesis (Phyllobacteriaceae) and CO-oxidation (Labrenzia).

== Human interactions ==
=== Clinical applications ===
Bryopsis is a source of bioactive compounds such as therapeutic kahalalides. Kahalalide F (KF) acts against human cancer cell lines. Clinical trials have demonstrated that when KF is combined with its other isomers it is highly sensitive to drug resistant strains of cancer. The potential for clinical application is being explored, though the mechanism by which KF targets cancer cells is not well understood. Potentially invasive green algae that grow as a result of algal blooms could be recovered to extract KF for clinical purposes. This is thought to be a pragmatic approach to addressing the ecological impact of green macroalgae blooms and the economic burden associated with manufacturing KF for clinical trials.

Bioactive compounds are also known to be present among Bryopsis, specifically among B. pennata and B. plumosa with different biological activities such as antifungal, antibacterial, and anticoagulant properties. Bioactive compounds found in the genus are also being used as treatments for different types of cancers (e.g. prostate, lung), as treatment for AIDS, and as mosquito repellants.

=== Aquaria ===
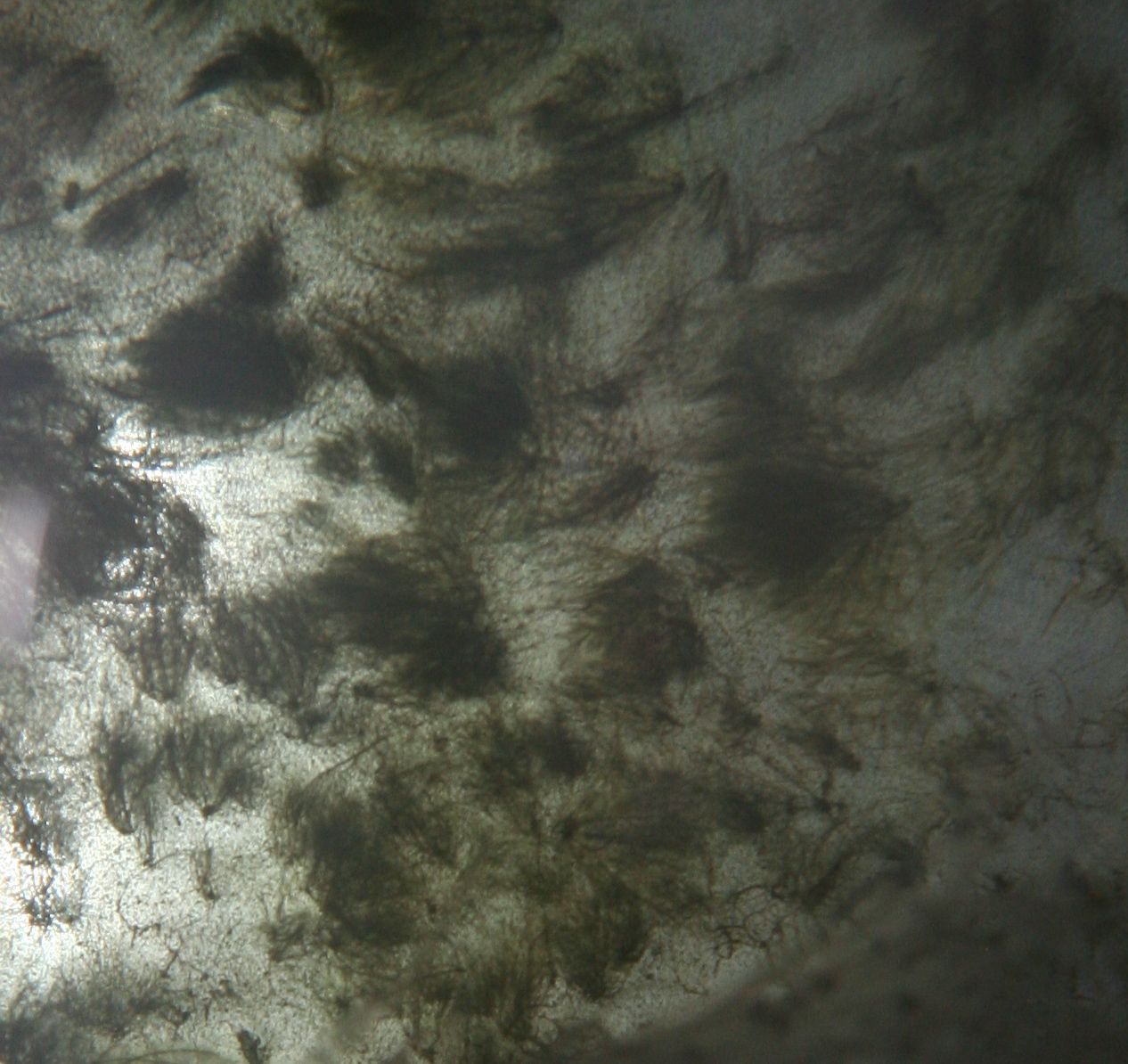
Bryopsis in a reef aquarium

Species of Bryopsis commonly populate commercial aquariums. They are introduced to aquariums on live rocks and the nutrient rich environment is favorable for its growth. With little competition or predation in these environments, Bryopsis can overtake the benthic surface creating unfavorable low-oxygen environments for other species. The elimination and control of Bryopsis within aquariums is challenging to manage and has economic significance.

This algae is usually seen as a nuisance though it may be desirable in macroalgae tanks. Though it is rarely sold on its own, its coarse composition aids in accumulating detritus from which it can derive nutrients. Eradication can be achieved through the use of grazers (including several crabs, mollusks, and sea urchins), manual removal, light starvation, and nutrient reduction. Elevated magnesium may hinder the growth of the algae but can be dangerous to invertebrates.

Bryopsis plumosa and Bryopsis pennata are especially troublesome.

== Discovery ==
Jean Vincent Felix Lamouroux was the first person to differentiate green, red and brown algae. In 1809, he discovered five new marine algal genera and he cited his findings in the Journal de Botanique. Among them were the first five species in the genus Bryopsis (B. pennata, B. hypnoides, B. arbuscula, B. cupressina and B. muscosa). He described this genus as being green, with feather-like fronds. Lamouroux differentiated these species by their size, arrangement and densities of pinnules on the main axes of the thallus.

In 1823, Bory de Saint Vincent brought forth the family of green algae Bryopsidaceae which included the genus Bryopsis, (Bryopsidales, Ulvophyceae and Chlorophyta). Later, 4 other genera (Bryopsidella, Derbesia, Pedobesia and Trichosolen) were also placed in this family. Since Lamouroux's initial discovery, there have been over 60 Bryopsis species described worldwide.

The discovery of the variety of life history patterns has been formative in understanding the relationship between Bryopsis and other genera in the order. The life history varies between species of Bryopsis and even within single species of this genus. The differentiation of new genera, such as Bryopsidella, which was previously reported as Bryposis halymeniae and Derbesia neglecta, resulted from the identification of its unique life history. This resulted in taxonomic reorganization at the family level. Continuous morphological variations and their inherently simple thallus structure has made it difficult to differentiate species within this genus. Therefore, the use of molecular datasets is an important tool in differentiating species. Currently, research using the chloroplast genome of Bryopsis as an identifier for species level studies is being done. The entire chloroplast genome of B. plumosa, B. maxima and B. hypnoides has been sequenced.

== Taxonomy and nomenclature ==
The word Bryopsis comes from Greek origins. Bry- comes from the Greek words bryos and byron, meaning moss, blossom and bloom. Ópsis or Ypsis is the Greek word for appearance or sight. -opsis is synonymous to "likeness" and used in naming living organisms with organic structures that resemble other pre-existing structures that have already been named.

Bryopsis was originally described by Lamouroux in 1809, providing information on five species based on morphological appearance, specifically the pinnules, its number, lengths, and arrangement. In eastern USA, three species of Bryopsis namely: B. pennata, B. hynoides, B. plumosa are known to inhabit together or separately.

Challenges in identifying Bryopsis species often arise from the great number of categories between species within the genus due to phenotypic traits that are quite similar from one another. Morphological analysis alone can lead to misidentification of species and misuse of nomenclature. In order to fully understand the diversity within the genus, different physiological aspects have been analyzed (e.g. life cycle, chromosomes) however, these have been insufficient in further elucidating taxonomic issues within species. Thus, the need for research using genetic markers may be of primary importance in recognizing several species that are morphologically plastic in nature.

=== Species list ===
- Bryopsis adriatica
- Bryopsis africana
- Bryopsis australis
- Bryopsis cespitosa
- Bryopsis corticulans
- Bryopsis corymbosa
- Bryopsis cupressina
- Bryopsis cupressoides
- Bryopsis dasyphylla
- Bryopsis derbesioides
- Bryopsis dichotoma
- Bryopsis duplex
- Bryopsis eckloniae
- Bryopsis feldmannii
- Bryopsis flagellata
- Bryopsis foliosa
- Bryopsis galapagensis
- Bryopsis gemellipara
- Bryopsis halliae
- Bryopsis harveyana
- Bryopsis hypnoides
- Bryopsis implexa
- Bryopsis indica
- Bryopsis lubrica
- Bryopsis lyngbyei
- Bryopsis macraildii
- Bryopsis macrocarpa
- Bryopsis magellanica
- Bryopsis maxima
- Bryopsis minor
- Bryopsis muscosa
- Bryopsis myosuroides
- Bryopsis nana
- Bryopsis palliolatis
- Bryopsis penicillum
- Bryopsis pennata
- Bryopsis pennulata
- Bryopsis peruviana
- Bryopsis plumosa
- Bryopsis pottsii
- Bryopsis profunda
- Bryopsis pusilla
- Bryopsis ramulosa
- Bryopsis rhizophora
- Bryopsis robusta
- Bryopsis rosea
- Bryopsis ryukyuensis
- Bryopsis salvadoreana
- Bryopsis secunda
- Bryopsis spinescens
- Bryopsis stenoptera
- Bryopsis tenuis
- Bryopsis thuyoides
- Bryopsis triploramosa
- Bryopsis vestita
