= Aquamicrobium segne =

Scientific classification
- Domain: Bacteria
- Kingdom: Pseudomonadati
- Phylum: Pseudomonadota
- Class: Alphaproteobacteria
- Order: Hyphomicrobiales
- Family: Phyllobacteriaceae
- Genus: Aquamicrobium
- Species: A. segne

Binomial name
- Aquamicrobium segne Lipski and Kämpfer 2012

Type strain
- 1006/1, CCUG 55250, DSM 19714

Species of bacterium

Aquamicrobium segne is a Gram-negative, aerobic bacteria from the genus Aquamicrobium which was isolated from a biofilter of an animal rendering plant in Germany.
