= Marinobacter xestospongiae =

Scientific classification
- Domain: Bacteria
- Kingdom: Pseudomonadati
- Phylum: Pseudomonadota
- Class: Alphaproteobacteria
- Order: Hyphomicrobiales
- Family: Phyllobacteriaceae
- Genus: Marinobacter
- Species: M. xestospongiae

Binomial name
- Marinobacter xestospongiae Lee et al. 2012

Type strain
- JCM 17469, NRRL B-59512, UST090418-1611

Synonyms
- Marinobacter mosjesanensis

Species of bacterium

Marinobacter xestospongiae is a Gram-negative, slightly halophilic and non-spore-forming bacterium from the genus of Marinobacter which has been isolated from the sponge Xestospongia testudinaria from the sea coast of Saudi Arabia.
