= Marinobacter =

Scientific classification
- Domain: Bacteria
- Kingdom: Pseudomonadati
- Phylum: Pseudomonadota
- Class: Alphaproteobacteria
- Order: Hyphomicrobiales
- Family: Phyllobacteriaceae
- Genus: Marinobacter; Gauthier et al. 1992

Type species
- Marinobacter hydrocarbonoclasticus

Species
- M. adhaerens M. algicola M. alkaliphilus M. antarcticus M. arcticus M. aromaticivorans M. bryozoorum M. daepoensis M. daqiaonensis M. excellens M. flavimaris M. gudaonensis M. guineae M. halophilus M. gudaonensis M. halotolerans M. hydrocarbonoclasticus M. koreensis M. lacisalsi M. lipolyticus M. litoralis M. lutaoensis M. maritimus M. mobilis M. nitratireducens M. oulmenensis M. pelagius M. persicus M. psychrophilus M. salinus M. nanhaiticus M. salarius M. salicampi M. salsuginis M. santoriniensis M. sediminum M. segnicrescens M. shengliensis M. squalenivorans M. similis M. szutsaonensis M. vinifirmus M. xestospongiae M. zhanjiangensis M. zhejiangensis

Genus of bacteria

Marinobacter is a genus of bacteria found in sea water. They are also found in a variety of salt lakes. A number of strains and species can degrade hydrocarbons. The species involved in hydrocarbon degradation include M. alkaliphilus, M. arcticus, M. hydrocarbonoclasticus, M. maritimus, and M. squalenivorans.

There are currently 46 species of Marinobacter that are characterized by Gram-negative rods and salt-tolerance.
