= Nitratireductor indicus =

Scientific classification
- Domain: Bacteria
- Kingdom: Pseudomonadati
- Phylum: Pseudomonadota
- Class: Alphaproteobacteria
- Order: Hyphomicrobiales
- Family: Phyllobacteriaceae
- Genus: Nitratireductor
- Species: N. indicus

Binomial name
- Nitratireductor indicus Lai et al. 2011

Type strain
- C115, CCTCC AB 209298, LMG 25540, MCCC 1A01260, RC92-7, Wang C115

Species of bacterium

Nitratireductor indicus is a Gram-negative, oxidase- and catalase-positive mobile bacteria from the genus of Nitratireductor which was isolated from deep-sea water of the Indian Ocean.
