= Marinobacter salinus =

Scientific classification
- Domain: Bacteria
- Kingdom: Pseudomonadati
- Phylum: Pseudomonadota
- Class: Alphaproteobacteria
- Order: Hyphomicrobiales
- Family: Phyllobacteriaceae
- Genus: Marinobacter
- Species: M. salinus

Binomial name
- Marinobacter salinus Rani et al. 2017

Type strain
- JCM 31416, KCTC 52255, Hb8

Species of bacterium

Marinobacter salinus is a Gram-negative, aerobic, halophilic, rod-shaped and motile bacterium from the genus of Marinobacter which has been isolated from tidal flat on Korea.
