= Marinobacter aromaticivorans =

Scientific classification
- Domain: Bacteria
- Kingdom: Pseudomonadati
- Phylum: Pseudomonadota
- Class: Alphaproteobacteria
- Order: Hyphomicrobiales
- Family: Phyllobacteriaceae
- Genus: Marinobacter
- Species: M. aromaticivorans

Binomial name
- Marinobacter aromaticivorans Cui et al. 2016

Type strain
- CGMCC 1.11015, KCTC 23781, D15-8P

Species of bacterium

Marinobacter aromaticivorans is a Gram-negative, rod-shaped and slightly halotolerant bacterium from the genus of Marinobacter which has been isolated from sediments from the South China Sea. Marinobacter aromaticivorans has the ability to degrade polycyclic aromatic hydrocarbons.
