= Marinobacter shengliensis =

Scientific classification
- Domain: Bacteria
- Kingdom: Pseudomonadati
- Phylum: Pseudomonadota
- Class: Alphaproteobacteria
- Order: Hyphomicrobiales
- Family: Phyllobacteriaceae
- Genus: Marinobacter
- Species: M. shengliensis

Binomial name
- Marinobacter shengliensis Luo et al. 2015

Type strain
- SL013A-24A, SL013A-34A-2, SL013A24A, SL013A34A2

Species of bacterium

Marinobacter shengliensis is a Gram-negative, moderately halophilic, aerobic and rod-shaped bacterium from the genus of Marinobacter with a single polar flagellum, which has been isolated from saline soil which was contaminated with oil from the Shengli Oilfield in China.
