= Nitratireductor kimnyeongensis =

Scientific classification
- Domain: Bacteria
- Kingdom: Pseudomonadati
- Phylum: Pseudomonadota
- Class: Alphaproteobacteria
- Order: Hyphomicrobiales
- Family: Phyllobacteriaceae
- Genus: Nitratireductor
- Species: N. kimnyeongensis

Binomial name
- Nitratireductor kimnyeongensis Kang et al. 2009

Type strain
- JCM 14851, KACC 11904, KY 101

Synonyms
- Nitratireductor kimnyeongense

Species of bacterium

Nitratireductor kimnyeongensis is a Gram-negative, aerobic, oxidase- and catalase-positive bacteria from the genus of Nitratireductor which was isolated from the Kimnyeong Beach in Jeju from the Republic of Korea.
