= Pseudahrensia todarodis =

Scientific classification
- Domain: Bacteria
- Kingdom: Pseudomonadati
- Phylum: Pseudomonadota
- Class: Alphaproteobacteria
- Order: Hyphomicrobiales
- Family: Ahrensiaceae
- Genus: Pseudahrensia
- Species: P. todarodis

Binomial name
- Pseudahrensia todarodis Kim et al. 2016

Type strain
- JCM 30419, KACC 18257, KHS02

Species of bacterium

Pseudahrensia todarodis is a Gram-negative, non-spore-forming, aerobic, rod-shaped and non-motile bacterium from the genus of Pseudahrensia which has been isolated from the gut of the squid Todarodes pacificus from the Sea of Japan.
