= Marinobacter daqiaonensis =

Scientific classification
- Domain: Bacteria
- Kingdom: Pseudomonadati
- Phylum: Pseudomonadota
- Class: Alphaproteobacteria
- Order: Hyphomicrobiales
- Family: Phyllobacteriaceae
- Genus: Marinobacter
- Species: M. daqiaonensis

Binomial name
- Marinobacter daqiaonensis Qu et al. 2011

Type strain
- CGMCC 1.9167, LMG 25365, NCCB 100308, Qu YCSA40, YCSA40

Species of bacterium

Marinobacter daqiaonensis is a Gram-negative and moderately halophilic bacterium from the genus of Marinobacter which has been isolated from sediments of the Daqiao saltern in Qingdao.
