= Aquamicrobium aerolatum =

Scientific classification
- Domain: Bacteria
- Kingdom: Pseudomonadati
- Phylum: Pseudomonadota
- Class: Alphaproteobacteria
- Order: Hyphomicrobiales
- Family: Phyllobacteriaceae
- Genus: Aquamicrobium
- Species: A. aerolatum

Binomial name
- Aquamicrobium aerolatum Kämpfer et al. 2009

Type strain
- CCUG 57044, DSM 21857, Sa14

Synonyms
- Aquamicrobium aerolata

Species of bacterium

Aquamicrobium aerolatum is a gram-negative, oxidase-positive, aerobic, rod-shaped, motile bacteria from the genus Aquamicrobium which was isolated from air from a duck shed in Germany. Defluvibacter lusatiensis was transferred to Aquamicrobium aerolatum.
