= Aquamicrobium defluvii =

Scientific classification
- Domain: Bacteria
- Kingdom: Pseudomonadati
- Phylum: Pseudomonadota
- Class: Alphaproteobacteria
- Order: Hyphomicrobiales
- Family: Phyllobacteriaceae
- Genus: Aquamicrobium
- Species: A. defluvii

Binomial name
- Aquamicrobium defluvii Bambauer et al. 1998

Type strain
- CFBP 6740, CIP 105610, DSM 11603, LMG 22048, NKK

Species of bacterium

Aquamicrobium defluvii is a gram-negative, oxidase- and catalase-positive, bacteria from the genus Aquamicrobium which was isolated from activated sewage sludge in Germany. Oxygen can be used as a terminal electron acceptor. Different carbons were tested but only a few sugars, fatty acids and thiophene 2-carboxylate supported growth. The genomic information about these species is limited and more research is needed. Aquamicrobium defluvii uses thiophene-2-carboxylate as its only source of carbon.
