= Chelativorans oligotrophicus =

Scientific classification
- Domain: Bacteria
- Kingdom: Pseudomonadati
- Phylum: Pseudomonadota
- Class: Alphaproteobacteria
- Order: Hyphomicrobiales
- Family: Phyllobacteriaceae
- Genus: Chelativorans
- Species: C. oligotrophicus

Binomial name
- Chelativorans oligotrophicus Doronina et al. 2010

Type strain
- DSM 19276, LPM-4, VKM B-2395

Synonyms
- Chelatovorus oligotrophus

Species of bacterium

Chelativorans oligotrophicus is a Gram-negative, aerobic, non-motile bacteria from the genus of Chelativorans.
