= Aquamicrobium ahrensii =

Scientific classification
- Domain: Bacteria
- Kingdom: Pseudomonadati
- Phylum: Pseudomonadota
- Class: Alphaproteobacteria
- Order: Hyphomicrobiales
- Family: Phyllobacteriaceae
- Genus: Aquamicrobium
- Species: A. ahrensii

Binomial name
- Aquamicrobium ahrensii Lipski and Kämpfer 2012

Type strain
- 905/1, CCUG 55251, DSM 19730

Synonyms
- Phyllobacteriaceae bacterium

Species of bacterium

Aquamicrobium ahrensii is a gram-negative, aerobic, bacteria from the genus Aquamicrobium which was isolated from biofilter from an animal rendering plant in Germany.
