= Marinobacter salicampi =

Scientific classification
- Domain: Bacteria
- Kingdom: Pseudomonadati
- Phylum: Pseudomonadota
- Class: Alphaproteobacteria
- Order: Hyphomicrobiales
- Family: Phyllobacteriaceae
- Genus: Marinobacter
- Species: M. salicampi

Binomial name
- Marinobacter salicampi Yoon et al. 2007

Type strain
- CCUG 54357, KCTC 12972, ISL-40

Species of bacterium

Marinobacter salicampi is a Gram-negative, rod-shaped and motile bacterium from the genus of Marinobacter which has been isolated from the Yellow Sea in Korea.
