= Marinobacter koreensis =

Scientific classification
- Domain: Bacteria
- Kingdom: Pseudomonadati
- Phylum: Pseudomonadota
- Class: Alphaproteobacteria
- Order: Hyphomicrobiales
- Family: Phyllobacteriaceae
- Genus: Marinobacter
- Species: M. koreensis

Binomial name
- Marinobacter koreensis Kim et al. 2006

Type strain
- DD-M3, DSM 17924, KACC 11513

Species of bacterium

Marinobacter koreensis is a Gram-negative, straight-rod-shaped, aerobic and moderately halophilic bacterium from the genus of Marinobacter which has been isolated from sea sand from Pohang in Korea.
