= Marinobacter alkaliphilus =

Scientific classification
- Domain: Bacteria
- Kingdom: Pseudomonadati
- Phylum: Pseudomonadota
- Class: Alphaproteobacteria
- Order: Hyphomicrobiales
- Family: Phyllobacteriaceae
- Genus: Marinobacter
- Species: M. alkaliphilus

Binomial name
- Marinobacter alkaliphilus Takai et al. 2005

Type strain
- ATCC BAA-889, JCM12291, ODP1200D-1.5

Species of bacterium

Marinobacter alkaliphilus is an alkaliphilic and mesophilic bacterium from the genus of Marinobacter from the Ocean which has been investigated from the Ocean Drilling Program.
