= Aminobacter carboxidus =

Scientific classification
- Domain: Bacteria
- Kingdom: Pseudomonadati
- Phylum: Pseudomonadota
- Class: Alphaproteobacteria
- Order: Hyphomicrobiales
- Family: Phyllobacteriaceae
- Genus: Aminobacter
- Species: A. carboxidus

Binomial name
- Aminobacter carboxidus (Meyer et al. 1994) Hördt et al. 2020

Type strain
- ATCC 51424, CIP 105722, DSM 1086, VKM B-1332, Z-1171

Synonyms
- Alcaligenes carboxydus (Nozhevnikova and Zavarzin 1974) Cypionka et al. 1980; Achromobacter carboxydus Nozhevnikova and Zavarzin 1974; Carbophilus carboxidus (ex Nozhevnikova and Zavarzin 1974) Meyer et al. 1994

Species of bacterium

Aminobacter carboxidus is a gram-negative bacterium from the genus Aminobacter which has been isolated from soil in Moscow in Russia.
