= Marinobacter zhejiangensis =

Scientific classification
- Domain: Bacteria
- Kingdom: Pseudomonadati
- Phylum: Pseudomonadota
- Class: Alphaproteobacteria
- Order: Hyphomicrobiales
- Family: Phyllobacteriaceae
- Genus: Marinobacter
- Species: M. zhejiangensis

Binomial name
- Marinobacter zhejiangensis Huo et al. 2008

Type strain
- CGMCC 1.7061, JCM 15156, CN74

Species of bacterium

Marinobacter zhejiangensis is a Gram-negative, aerobic, halophilic and rod-shaped bacterium from the genus of Marinobacter which has been isolated from sediments from the East China Sea.
