= Aquamicrobium terrae =

Scientific classification
- Domain: Bacteria
- Kingdom: Pseudomonadati
- Phylum: Pseudomonadota
- Class: Alphaproteobacteria
- Order: Hyphomicrobiales
- Family: Phyllobacteriaceae
- Genus: Aquamicrobium
- Species: A. terrae

Binomial name
- Aquamicrobium terrae Wu et al. 2014

Type strain
- CICC 10733, DSM 27865, hun6

Species of bacterium

Aquamicrobium terrae is a Gram-negative, aerobic and non-motile bacteria from the genus Aquamicrobium which has been isolated from soil which was contaminated with aromatic compounds in Nanjing in China.
