= German Cemetery of Lomé =

Details
- Established: 1893
- Location: Lomé, Maritime Region
- Country: Togo

The German Cemetery of Lomé is a historic cemetery in Lomé, Togo, associated with the period of German colonial rule. It contains graves of missionaries, merchants and members of the German colonial administration, as well as several Togolese figures.

== History ==
The cemetery was established in 1893. The oldest known burial is that of a person who died in 1889 and whose remains were later transferred to the site.

During German rule, the cemetery was divided into areas used by Christian missions and the colonial administration. The Basel Mission also used an area north of the administrative section.

In 1902, colonial governor August Köhler ordered that employees of the German administration who died in Togoland should be buried locally rather than have their bodies repatriated to Europe. Köhler died later that year and was himself buried in the cemetery.

The cemetery continued to be used after the end of German rule. Togolese Protestant figures, including pastors Andreas Aku and Robert Baeta, were also buried there.

== Description ==
=== Location ===
The cemetery is located near the coast of Lomé, east of present-day Tokmake Street, which was known as Bremer Straße during German rule.

The site is enclosed by a masonry wall, with its main entrance on the southern side facing the coast. Almond trees planted within the cemetery date to 1905.

=== Burials ===
More than forty graves dating from the German colonial period have been identified at the cemetery. They include missionaries, merchants and members of the colonial administration who died in or around Lomé.

The site also contains graves of Togolese people, reflecting its continued use after the German colonial period.

== Heritage ==
The cemetery is among the surviving sites associated with German colonial rule in Togo documented by the Goethe-Institut in cooperation with Togolese authorities. Historical information panels were installed at several former German colonial sites in Lomé and Kpalimé, including the cemetery.

== See also ==
- History of Togo
- German Togoland
- Lomé
