= Marinobacter nanhaiticus =

Scientific classification
- Domain: Bacteria
- Kingdom: Pseudomonadati
- Phylum: Pseudomonadota
- Class: Alphaproteobacteria
- Order: Hyphomicrobiales
- Family: Phyllobacteriaceae
- Genus: Marinobacter
- Species: M. nanhaiticus

Binomial name
- Marinobacter nanhaiticus Gao et al. 2013

Type strain
- CGMCC 1.11019, KCTC 23749, D15-8W

Species of bacterium

Marinobacter nanhaiticus is a Gram-negative, facultatively anaerobic and slightly halophilic bacterium from the genus of Marinobacter which has been isolated from sediments from the South China Sea. Marinobacter nanhaiticus has the ability to degrade polycyclic aromatic hydrocarbons.
