= Aquamicrobium soli =

Scientific classification
- Domain: Bacteria
- Kingdom: Pseudomonadati
- Phylum: Pseudomonadota
- Class: Alphaproteobacteria
- Order: Hyphomicrobiales
- Family: Phyllobacteriaceae
- Genus: Aquamicrobium
- Species: A. soli

Binomial name
- Aquamicrobium soli Xu et al. 2017

Type strain
- CCTCC AB2016045, KCTC 52165, strain NK8

Synonyms
- Aquamicrobium nanjngzl

Species of bacterium

Aquamicrobium soli is a Gram-negative, aerobic, short rod-shaped non-spore-forming and non-motile bacteria from the genus Aquamicrobium which has been isolated from soil which was contaminated with chlorobenzoate in China.
