= Bryopsidella neglecta =

Scientific classification
- Clade: Viridiplantae
- Division: Chlorophyta
- Class: Ulvophyceae
- Order: Bryopsidales
- Family: Bryopsidaceae
- Genus: Bryopsidella
- Species: B. neglecta

Binomial name
- Bryopsidella neglecta (Berthold) Furnari and Cormaci

Synonyms
- Derbesia neglecta Berthold; Bryopsis halymeniae Berthold; Bryopsidella halymeniae (Berthold) Boudoresque and Perret-Boudoresque

Species of alga

Bryopsidella neglecta is a species of green alga.
