= Aminobacter lissarensis =

Scientific classification
- Domain: Bacteria
- Kingdom: Pseudomonadati
- Phylum: Pseudomonadota
- Class: Alphaproteobacteria
- Order: Hyphomicrobiales
- Family: Phyllobacteriaceae
- Genus: Aminobacter
- Species: A. lissarensis

Binomial name
- Aminobacter lissarensis McDonald et al. 2005

Type strain
- CC495, CCUG 50579, CIP 108661, DSM 17454, NCIMB 13789

Species of bacterium

Aminobacter lissarensis is a gram-negative bacterium from the genus of Aminobacter which was isolated from soil of beech woodland on Northern Ireland.
