= Aminobacter anthyllidis =

Scientific classification
- Domain: Bacteria
- Kingdom: Pseudomonadati
- Phylum: Pseudomonadota
- Class: Alphaproteobacteria
- Order: Hyphomicrobiales
- Family: Phyllobacteriaceae
- Genus: Aminobacter
- Species: A. anthyllidis

Binomial name
- Aminobacter anthyllidis Maynaud et al. 2013

Type strain
- CFBP 7437, LMG 26462, STM4645

Species of bacterium

Aminobacter anthyllidis is a species of gram-negative bacterium from the genus of Aminobacter.
