= Aquamicrobium lusatiense =

Scientific classification
- Domain: Bacteria
- Kingdom: Pseudomonadati
- Phylum: Pseudomonadota
- Class: Alphaproteobacteria
- Order: Hyphomicrobiales
- Family: Phyllobacteriaceae
- Genus: Aquamicrobium
- Species: A. lusatiense

Binomial name
- Aquamicrobium lusatiense Kämpfer et al. 2009

Type strain
- CFBP 6738, CIP 106844, DSM 11099, S1

Synonyms
- Defluvibacter lusatiensis; Defluvibacter lusatiae

Species of bacterium

Aquamicrobium lusatiense is a Gram-negative, oxidase-positive, strictly aerobic bacteria from the genus Aquamicrobium with a polar flagellum, which was isolated from activated sludge in Germany. Aquamicrobium lusatiense is able to degrade 2,4-dichlorophenol, 4-chloro-2-methylphenol, 4-chlorophenol, and phenol.
