= Nitratireductor lucknowense =

Scientific classification
- Domain: Bacteria
- Kingdom: Pseudomonadati
- Phylum: Pseudomonadota
- Class: Alphaproteobacteria
- Order: Hyphomicrobiales
- Family: Phyllobacteriaceae
- Genus: Nitratireductor
- Species: N. lucknowense

Binomial name
- Nitratireductor lucknowense Manickam et al. 2012

Type strain
- DSM 24322, MTCC 8354, strain IITR-21

Species of bacterium

Nitratireductor lucknowense is a bacterium from the genus of Nitratireductor which was isolated from pesticide contaminated soil in Lucknow in India.
