= Marinobacter hydrocarbonoclasticus =

Scientific classification
- Domain: Bacteria
- Kingdom: Pseudomonadati
- Phylum: Pseudomonadota
- Class: Alphaproteobacteria
- Order: Hyphomicrobiales
- Family: Phyllobacteriaceae
- Genus: Marinobacter
- Species: M. hydrocarbonoclasticus

Binomial name
- Marinobacter hydrocarbonoclasticus Gauthier et al. 1992

Synonyms
- Pseudomonas nautica Bauman et al. 1972; Marinobacter aquaeolei Nguyen et al. 1999

Species of bacterium

Marinobacter hydrocarbonoclasticus is a species of bacteria found in sea water which are able to degrade hydrocarbons. The cells are rod-shaped and motile by means of a single polar flagellum.

== Etymology ==
‘Hydrocarbonoclastic’ means ‘hydrocarbon dismantling.’ These bacteria were named as such because they can degrade the major components of oil.

== History ==
Both the genus Marinobacter and the species Marinobacter hydrocarbonoclasticus were first identified and described in 1992 by Gauthier et al. Using polymerase chain reaction to analyze by 16sRNA DNA, Gauthier showed that it was a member of the gamma group of the Proteobacteria, with sufficient distance to other described Proteobacteria to warrant the creation of a new genus.

In 2005, Marquez and Ventosa from the Department of Microbiology and Parasitology of the University of Sevilla in Spain used “G+C content, fatty acid composition, and DNA-DNA hybridization… to understand the taxonomic positions” of Marinobacter hydrocarbonoclasticus and Marinobacter aquaeolei. “Marquez suggests that the two species be united under the same name since they are heterotypic synonyms due to phenotypic and phylogenetic traits.”

In 2011, Hamdan & Fuller discovered that Marinobacter hydrocarbonoclastus, die when exposed to the chemical dispersant COREXIT EC9500A used to treat the Deepwater Horizon oilspill.

== Genome Structure ==
The genome of Marinobacter hydrocarbonoclasticus has a 52.7% guanine + cytosine content.

== Evolution and Phylogeny ==
Marinobacter hydrocarbonoclasticus are a type of eubacteria. 16sRNA DNA analysis indicates that these organisms are related to the Gammaproteobacteria. Initial 16sRNA phylogenetic analysis did not reveal any close relatives to Marinobacter hydrocarbonoclasticus. Therefore, the organism was placed in a genus of its own, with scientists believing that Pseudomonas aeruginosa was its closest modern relative.

In 1999, 16S rDNA sequence analysis revealed Marinobacter hydrocarbonoclasticus to have a very close relative in Marinobacter aquaeolei. The two organisms contain 16S rDNA sequences with 99.4% similarity.

The organisms from the genus Marinobacter have been found to have high diversity in terms of the environments they inhabit. Marinobacter species have been discovered in “hypersaline bacterial mats, marine hot-water springs in Japan, [and] cold seawater as in Arctic and Antarctic regions.”

== Morphology and description ==
Marinobacter hydrocarbonoclasticus are Gram-negative and rod shaped. Their cells are, on average, are 0.3-0.6 μm in diameter and 2-3 μm long. Their ability to produce flagella is largely dependent on the NaCl concentration of their environment. In solutions with NaCl concentrations of 0.6-1.5M, Marinobacter hydrocarbonoclasticus produce and move by the movement of “a single unsheathed polar flagellum.” In solutions with NaCl concentrations <0.2 or >1.5, M. hydrocarbonoclasticus are unable to produce flagella, and are thereby unable to influence their movement through medium.

== Metabolism ==
Marinobacter hydrocarbonoclasticus cells do not contain cytochrome P450, which is the key enzyme for degrading aromatic rings, a major component of petroleum hydrocarbons. These organisms are adapted to growing on long non-cyclic alkanes, which are common in petroleum hydrocarbons. Cells can grow on aromatic hydrocarbons, such as hydrocarbons containing aromatic rings. Marinobacter hydrocarbonoclasticus are not obligate hydrocarbonoclastic organisms; they can also grow on standard medium, without hydrocarbons. Moreover, Marinobacter cells can denitrify, producing nitrogen gas. They can use either nitrate (NO_{3}^{−}) or nitrite (NO_{2}^{−}) as their terminal elector. Marinobacter hydrocarbonoclasticus cells can grow in aerobic liquid medium culture and form colonies on agar, showing that they are not obligate anaerobes.

== Growth, Reproduction, and Behaviour ==
Marinobacter form discrete well-rounded colonies on plates, indicating that they reproduce via binary fission. Marinobacter hydrocarbonoclasticus can grow with or without the presence of oxygen. Their cells are tolerant of high salinities. They are capable of growing up to 3.5 Molar NaCl, but grow best at around 0.6 Molar, which is the molar of the Mediterranean seawater where they are isolated. They can grow as free plankton or as fixed elements of a biofilm. Marinobacter hydrocarbonoclasticus cells degrade hydrocarbons and excrete osmoprotectant ectoine. They also excrete Petrobactin, “a bis-catechol α-hydroxy acid siderophore that readily undergoes a light-mediated decarboxylation reaction when bound to Fe(III).”

== Significance in Technology and Industry ==
Marinobacter hydrocarbonoclastus degrade petroleum hydrocarbons, including those found in oceanic oil spills. In 2011, it was discovered that Marinobacter hydrocarbonoclastus are inhibited when exposed to the chemical COREXIT EC9500A. This chemical is a dispersant widely used to assist in the clean up after oceanic oil spills. In their tests, Hamdan and Fuller (2011) obtained data suggesting that, “hydrogen-degrading bacteria are inhibited by chemical dispersants, and that the use of dispersants has the potential to diminish the capacity of the environment to bioremediate spills.”

Marinobacter hydrocarbonoclasticus are able to grow in liquid culture and on agar plates, where they produced beige colonies. They are tolerant of high salinity and can grow aerobically and anaerobically. The ability to grow in heterogeneous environments could prove beneficial for scientists seeking new, bacterial based, techniques for oceanic oil spill clean up.
