= Nitratireductor aquibiodomus =

Scientific classification
- Domain: Bacteria
- Kingdom: Pseudomonadati
- Phylum: Pseudomonadota
- Class: Alphaproteobacteria
- Order: Hyphomicrobiales
- Family: Phyllobacteriaceae
- Genus: Nitratireductor
- Species: N. aquibiodomus

Binomial name
- Nitratireductor aquibiodomus Labbé et al. 2004

Type strain
- ATCC BAA-762, DSM 15645, IAM 15348, JCM 21793, NL21

Synonyms
- Aquabidomus nitratireducens

Species of bacterium

Nitratireductor aquibiodomus is a Gram-negative, rod-shaped bacteria from the genus of Nitratireductor which was isolated from a marine denitrification system in Canada.
