= Marinobacter adhaerens =

Scientific classification
- Domain: Bacteria
- Kingdom: Pseudomonadati
- Phylum: Pseudomonadota
- Class: Alphaproteobacteria
- Order: Hyphomicrobiales
- Family: Phyllobacteriaceae
- Genus: Marinobacter
- Species: M. adhaerens

Binomial name
- Marinobacter adhaerens Kaeppel et al. 2012

Type strain
- CIP 110141, DSM 23420, HP15, NCBI AY241552

Species of bacterium

Marinobacter adhaerens is a Gram-negative, rod-shaped and motile bactebacterium from the genus of Marinobacter which has been isolated from marine aggregates from the Wadden Sea in Germany.
