= Marinobacter lutaoensis =

Scientific classification
- Domain: Bacteria
- Kingdom: Pseudomonadati
- Phylum: Pseudomonadota
- Class: Alphaproteobacteria
- Order: Hyphomicrobiales
- Family: Phyllobacteriaceae
- Genus: Marinobacter
- Species: M. lutaoensis

Binomial name
- Marinobacter lutaoensis Shieh et al. 2003

Type strain
- BCRC 17087, CCRC 17087, JCM 11179, T5054

Synonyms
- Aeromarinobacter lutaoensis, Marinothermus lutaoensis

Species of bacterium

Marinobacter lutaoensis is a Gram-negative, heterotrophic, thermotolerant, strictly aerobic and non-spore-forming bacterium from the genus of Marinobacter which has been isolated from a hot spring from the coast of Lutao in Taiwan.
