= Marinobacter pelagius =

Scientific classification
- Domain: Bacteria
- Kingdom: Pseudomonadati
- Phylum: Pseudomonadota
- Class: Alphaproteobacteria
- Order: Hyphomicrobiales
- Family: Phyllobacteriaceae
- Genus: Marinobacter
- Species: M. pelagius

Binomial name
- Marinobacter pelagius Xu et al. 2008

Type strain
- CGMCC 1.6775, HS225, JCM 14804

Species of bacterium

Marinobacter pelagius is a Gram-negative, aerobic, moderately halophilic and neutrophilic bacterium from the genus of Marinobacter which has been isolated from seawater around Zhoushan in China. Marinobacter pelagius can be used to produce gold nanoparticles.
