= Marinobacter flavimaris =

Scientific classification
- Domain: Bacteria
- Kingdom: Pseudomonadati
- Phylum: Pseudomonadota
- Class: Alphaproteobacteria
- Order: Hyphomicrobiales
- Family: Phyllobacteriaceae
- Genus: Marinobacter
- Species: M. flavimaris

Binomial name
- Marinobacter flavimaris Yoon et al. 2004

Type strain
- CIP 108615, DSM 16070, Hoon SW-145, JCM 12323, KCTC 12185, LMG 23834, SW-145

Species of bacterium

Marinobacter flavimaris is a Gram-negative, non-spore-forming, slightly halophilic and motile bacterium from the genus of Marinobacter which has been isolated from sea water from the Yellow Sea in Korea.
