= Chelativorans xinjiangense =

Scientific classification
- Domain: Bacteria
- Kingdom: Pseudomonadati
- Phylum: Pseudomonadota
- Class: Alphaproteobacteria
- Order: Hyphomicrobiales
- Family: Phyllobacteriaceae
- Genus: Chelativorans
- Species: C. xinjiangense

Binomial name
- Chelativorans xinjiangense Meng et al. 2020

Type strain
- lm93

Species of bacterium

Chelativorans oligotrophicus is a Gram-negative, aerobic and rod-shaped from the genus of Chelativorans which has been isolated from soil from Xinjiang.
