= Marinobacter gudaonensis =

Scientific classification
- Domain: Bacteria
- Kingdom: Pseudomonadati
- Phylum: Pseudomonadota
- Class: Alphaproteobacteria
- Order: Hyphomicrobiales
- Family: Phyllobacteriaceae
- Genus: Marinobacter
- Species: M. gudaonensis

Binomial name
- Marinobacter gudaonensis Gu et al. 2007

Type strain
- CGMCC 1.6294, CIP 109534, DSM 18066, LMG 23509, SL014B61A, Wu SL014B-61A

Species of bacterium

Marinobacter gudaonensis is a Gram-negative and rod-shaped bacterium from the genus of Marinobacter which has been isolated from saline soil which was contaminated with oil from the Shengli Oil Field in China.
