= Marinobacter sediminum =

Scientific classification
- Domain: Bacteria
- Kingdom: Pseudomonadati
- Phylum: Pseudomonadota
- Class: Alphaproteobacteria
- Order: Hyphomicrobiales
- Family: Phyllobacteriaceae
- Genus: Marinobacter
- Species: M. sediminum

Binomial name
- Marinobacter sediminum Romanenko et al. 2005

Species of bacterium

Marinobacter sediminum is a marine, Gram-negative, aerobic and halophilic bacteria with type strain KMM 3657^{T} (=R65^{T} =DSM 15400^{T}).
