= Nitratireductor pacificus =

Scientific classification
- Domain: Bacteria
- Kingdom: Pseudomonadati
- Phylum: Pseudomonadota
- Class: Alphaproteobacteria
- Order: Hyphomicrobiales
- Family: Phyllobacteriaceae
- Genus: Nitratireductor
- Species: N. pacificus

Binomial name
- Nitratireductor pacificus Lai et al. 2011

Type strain
- CCTCC AB 209302, LMG 25541, MCCC 1A01024, pht-3B

Species of bacterium

Nitratireductor pacificus is a Gram-negative and motile bacteria from the genus of Nitratireductor which was isolated from enriched sediment from the Pacific Ocean.
