= Marinobacter persicus =

Scientific classification
- Domain: Bacteria
- Kingdom: Pseudomonadati
- Phylum: Pseudomonadota
- Class: Alphaproteobacteria
- Order: Hyphomicrobiales
- Family: Phyllobacteriaceae
- Genus: Marinobacter
- Species: M. persicus

Binomial name
- Marinobacter persicus Bagheri et al. 2013

Type strain
- CCM 7970, CECT 7991, IBRC-M 10445, KCTC 23561, M9B

Species of bacterium

Marinobacter persicus is a Gram-negative, non-spore-forming, strictly aerobic and moderately halophilic bacterium from the genus of Marinobacter which has been isolated from the Aran-Bidgol Lake from the central desert of Iran.
