= Marinobacter oulmenensis =

Scientific classification
- Domain: Bacteria
- Kingdom: Pseudomonadati
- Phylum: Pseudomonadota
- Class: Alphaproteobacteria
- Order: Hyphomicrobiales
- Family: Phyllobacteriaceae
- Genus: Marinobacter
- Species: M. oulmenensis

Binomial name
- Marinobacter oulmenensis Kharroub et al. 2011

Type strain
- CECT 7499, DSM 22359, Set74

Species of bacterium

Marinobacter oulmenensis is a Gram-negative, aerobic and moderately halophilic bacterium from the genus of Marinobacter which has been isolated from brine from Sabkha in Ain Oulmene in Algeria.
