= Corticibacterium populi =

Scientific classification
- Domain: Bacteria
- Kingdom: Pseudomonadati
- Phylum: Pseudomonadota
- Class: Alphaproteobacteria
- Order: Hyphomicrobiales
- Family: Phyllobacteriaceae
- Genus: Corticibacterium
- Species: C. populi

Binomial name
- Corticibacterium populi Li et al. 2016

Type strain
- sp. 4107-9-1, CFCC 12884, KCTC 42249, 16B10-2-7

Species of bacterium

Corticibacterium populi is a Gram-negative, aerobic and motile bacterium from the genus of Corticibacterium which has been isolated from the bark Populus × euramericana.
