= Chelativorans composti =

Scientific classification
- Domain: Bacteria
- Kingdom: Pseudomonadati
- Phylum: Pseudomonadota
- Class: Alphaproteobacteria
- Order: Hyphomicrobiales
- Family: Phyllobacteriaceae
- Genus: Chelativorans
- Species: C. composti

Binomial name
- Chelativorans composti Kämpfer et al. 2015

Type strain
- JCM 17863, KCTC 23707, Nis3

Synonyms
- Thermovum composti Yabe et al. 2012

Species of bacterium

Chelativorans composti is a Gram-negative and thermophilic bacteria from the genus of Chelativorans which has been isolated from compost.
