= Marinobacter lacisalsi =

Scientific classification
- Domain: Bacteria
- Kingdom: Pseudomonadati
- Phylum: Pseudomonadota
- Class: Alphaproteobacteria
- Order: Hyphomicrobiales
- Family: Phyllobacteriaceae
- Genus: Marinobacter
- Species: M. lacisalsi

Binomial name
- Marinobacter lacisalsi Aguilera et al. 2009

Type strain
- CECT 7297, FP2.5, LMG 24237

Species of bacterium

Marinobacter lacisalsi is a Gram-negative, non-spore-forming, aerobic and moderately halophilic bacterium from the genus Marinobacter that has been isolated from the lake from Fuente de Piedra in Spain.
