= Paramesorhizobium deserti =

Scientific classification
- Domain: Bacteria
- Kingdom: Pseudomonadati
- Phylum: Pseudomonadota
- Class: Alphaproteobacteria
- Order: Hyphomicrobiales
- Family: Phyllobacteriaceae
- Genus: Paramesorhizobium
- Species: "P." deserti"

Binomial name
- "Paramesorhizobium" deserti" Luo et al. 2015

Type strain
- A-3-E

Species of bacterium

"Paramesorhizobium deserti" is an antibiotic resistant bacterium from the genus "Paramesorhizobium" which has been isolated from soil from the Taklimakan Desert in China.
