= Pseudohoeflea suaedae =

Scientific classification
- Domain: Bacteria
- Kingdom: Pseudomonadati
- Phylum: Pseudomonadota
- Class: Alphaproteobacteria
- Order: Hyphomicrobiales
- Family: Phyllobacteriaceae
- Genus: Pseudohoeflea
- Species: P. suaedae

Binomial name
- Pseudohoeflea suaedae (Chung et al. 2013) Hyeon et al. 2017

Type strain
- YC6898, KACC 14911, NBRC 107700

Synonyms
- Hoeflea suaedae Chung et al. 2013

Species of bacterium

Pseudohoeflea suaedae is a bacterium from the genus Pseudohoeflea which has been isolated from the root of the plant Suaeda maritima from the tidal flat of Namhae Island on Korea.
