= Aliihoeflea aestuarii =

Scientific classification
- Domain: Bacteria
- Kingdom: Pseudomonadati
- Phylum: Pseudomonadota
- Class: Alphaproteobacteria
- Order: Hyphomicrobiales
- Family: Phyllobacteriaceae
- Genus: Aliihoeflea
- Species: "A." aestuarii"

Binomial name
- "Aliihoeflea" aestuarii" Roh et al. 2008

Type strain
- DSM 19536, JCM 15118, KCTC 22052, N8

Synonyms
- Mesorhizobium aestuarii

Species of bacterium

"Aliihoeflea aestuarii" is a Gram-negative and rod-shaped bacterium from the genus "Aliihoeflea" which has been isolated from tidal flat sediments in Korea.
