= Marinobacter similis =

Scientific classification
- Domain: Bacteria
- Kingdom: Pseudomonadati
- Phylum: Pseudomonadota
- Class: Alphaproteobacteria
- Order: Hyphomicrobiales
- Family: Phyllobacteriaceae
- Genus: Marinobacter
- Species: M. similis

Binomial name
- Marinobacter similis Ng et al. 2015

Type strain
- CIP 110589, JCM 19398, KMM 7501, A3d10, JCM 19398

Species of bacterium

Marinobacter similis is a Gram-negative and motile bacterium from the genus of Marinobacter which has been isolated from seawater.
