= Aminobacter niigataensis =

Scientific classification
- Domain: Bacteria
- Kingdom: Pseudomonadati
- Phylum: Pseudomonadota
- Class: Alphaproteobacteria
- Order: Hyphomicrobiales
- Family: Phyllobacteriaceae
- Genus: Aminobacter
- Species: A. niigataensis

Binomial name
- Aminobacter niigataensis Urakami et al. 1992

Type strain
- ATCC 49932, CCM 4330, CCUG 48820, DM-81, DSM 7050, IAM 15265, JCM 7853, KACC 10905, KACC 11260

Species of bacterium

Aminobacter niigataensis is a gram-negative bacterium from the genus of Aminobacter which was isolated from soil.
