= Aminobacter ciceronei =

Scientific classification
- Domain: Bacteria
- Kingdom: Pseudomonadati
- Phylum: Pseudomonadota
- Class: Alphaproteobacteria
- Order: Hyphomicrobiales
- Family: Phyllobacteriaceae
- Genus: Aminobacter
- Species: A. ciceronei

Binomial name
- Aminobacter ciceronei McDonald et al. 2005

Type strain
- ATCC 202197, CCUG 50580, CIP 108660, DSM 17455, IAM 15301, IMB 1, JCM 21751

Species of bacterium

Aminobacter ciceronei is a gram-negative bacterium from the genus of Aminobacter which was isolated from agricultural soil in California in the United States. Aminobacter anthyllidis has the ability to degrade Chloromethane and Bromomethane.
