= Marinobacter psychrophilus =

Scientific classification
- Domain: Bacteria
- Kingdom: Pseudomonadati
- Phylum: Pseudomonadota
- Class: Alphaproteobacteria
- Order: Hyphomicrobiales
- Family: Phyllobacteriaceae
- Genus: Marinobacter
- Species: M. psychrophilus

Binomial name
- Marinobacter psychrophilus Zhang et al. 2008

Type strain
- CGMCC 1.6499, JCM 14643, BSi20041, 20041

Species of bacterium

Marinobacter psychrophilus is a Gram-negative, rod-shaped, psychrophilic and motile bacterium from the genus of Marinobacter which has been isolated from sea-ice of the Canadian Basin.
