= Marinobacter santoriniensis =

Scientific classification
- Domain: Bacteria
- Kingdom: Pseudomonadati
- Phylum: Pseudomonadota
- Class: Alphaproteobacteria
- Order: Hyphomicrobiales
- Family: Phyllobacteriaceae
- Genus: Marinobacter
- Species: M. santoriniensis

Binomial name
- Marinobacter santoriniensis Handley et al. 2009

Type strain
- ATCC BAA-1649, DSM 21262, NCIMB 14441, NKSG1

Species of bacterium

Marinobacter santoriniensis is a Gram-negative, facultatively anaerobic, non-spore-forming and motile bacterium from the genus of Marinobacter which has been isolated from hydrothermal sediments in Santorini in Greece. Marinobacter santoriniensis can metabolize arsenate and arsenite.
