= Marinobacter salarius =

Scientific classification
- Domain: Bacteria
- Kingdom: Pseudomonadati
- Phylum: Pseudomonadota
- Class: Alphaproteobacteria
- Order: Hyphomicrobiales
- Family: Phyllobacteriaceae
- Genus: Marinobacter
- Species: M. salarius

Binomial name
- Marinobacter salarius Ng et al. 2015

Type strain
- CIP 110588, JCM 19399, KMM 7502, LMG 27497, JCM 19399, R9SW1

Species of bacterium

Marinobacter salarius is a Gram-negative and motile bacterium from the genus of Marinobacter which has been isolated from sea water from the Chazhma Bay from the Sea of Japan.
