= Oricola cellulosilytica =

Scientific classification
- Domain: Bacteria
- Kingdom: Pseudomonadati
- Phylum: Pseudomonadota
- Class: Alphaproteobacteria
- Order: Hyphomicrobiales
- Family: Phyllobacteriaceae
- Genus: Oricola
- Species: O. cellulosilytica

Binomial name
- Oricola cellulosilytica Hameed et al. 2015

Type strain
- BCRC 80694, JCM 19534, CC-AMH-0

Species of bacterium

Oricola cellulosilytica is a Gram-negative, strictly aerobic, non-spore-forming, cellulose-degrading and motile bacterium from the genus of Oricola which has been isolated from water from the Hualien River on Taiwan.
