= Marinobacter guineae =

Scientific classification
- Domain: Bacteria
- Kingdom: Pseudomonadati
- Phylum: Pseudomonadota
- Class: Alphaproteobacteria
- Order: Hyphomicrobiales
- Family: Phyllobacteriaceae
- Genus: Marinobacter
- Species: M. guineae

Binomial name
- Marinobacter guineae Montes et al. 2008

Type strain
- CECT 7243, LMG 24048, M3B

Species of bacterium

Marinobacter guineae is a Gram-negative, aerobic and moderately halophilic bacterium from the genus Marinobacter which has been isolated from the South Shetland Islands.
