= Marinobacter halophilus =

Scientific classification
- Domain: Bacteria
- Kingdom: Pseudomonadati
- Phylum: Pseudomonadota
- Class: Alphaproteobacteria
- Order: Hyphomicrobiales
- Family: Phyllobacteriaceae
- Genus: Marinobacter
- Species: M. halophilus

Binomial name
- Marinobacter halophilus Zhong et al. 2015

Type strain
- CGMCC 1.12481, JCM 30472, XCD-X12

Species of bacterium

Marinobacter halophilus is a Gram-negative, non-spore-forming and halophilic bacterium from the genus of Marinobacter which has been isolated from the Xiaochaidan Lake in the Qaidam Basin in China.
