= L. maritimus =

L. maritimus may refer to:

- Lathyrus maritimus, a synonym for several species of pea
- Lotus maritimus, a deervetch species

== See also ==
- Maritimus (disambiguation)
