= Marinobacter mobilis =

Scientific classification
- Domain: Bacteria
- Kingdom: Pseudomonadati
- Phylum: Pseudomonadota
- Class: Alphaproteobacteria
- Order: Hyphomicrobiales
- Family: Phyllobacteriaceae
- Genus: Marinobacter
- Species: M. mobilis

Binomial name
- Marinobacter mobilis Huo et al. 2008

Type strain
- CGMCC 1.7059, JCM 15154, CN46, CN71

Species of bacterium

Marinobacter mobilis is a Gram-negative, halophilic, aerobic and motile bacterium from the genus of Marinobacter which has been isolated from sediments from the East China Sea.
