= Pseudahrensia aquimaris =

Scientific classification
- Domain: Bacteria
- Kingdom: Pseudomonadati
- Phylum: Pseudomonadota
- Class: Alphaproteobacteria
- Order: Hyphomicrobiales
- Family: Ahrensiaceae
- Genus: Pseudahrensia
- Species: P. aquimaris

Binomial name
- Pseudahrensia aquimaris Jung et al. 2012

Type strain
- CCUG 60023, HDW-32, KCTC 23345

Synonyms
- Ahrensia aquimaris

Species of bacterium

Pseudahrensia aquimaris is a Gram-negative and non-motile bacterium from the genus of Pseudahrensia which has been isolated from seawater from the Yellow Sea on Korea.
