= Marinobacter nitratireducens =

Scientific classification
- Domain: Bacteria
- Kingdom: Pseudomonadati
- Phylum: Pseudomonadota
- Class: Alphaproteobacteria
- Order: Hyphomicrobiales
- Family: Phyllobacteriaceae
- Genus: Marinobacter
- Species: M. nitratireducens

Binomial name
- Marinobacter nitratireducens Vaidya et al. 2015

Type strain
- JCM 18428, MTCC 11704, AK21

Species of bacterium

Marinobacter nitratireducens is a Gram-negative, halophilic rod-shaped and motile bacterium from the genus of Marinobacter which has been isolated from coastal sea water from Visakhapatnam in India.
