= Marinobacter arcticus =

Scientific classification
- Domain: Bacteria
- Kingdom: Pseudomonadati
- Phylum: Pseudomonadota
- Class: Alphaproteobacteria
- Order: Hyphomicrobiales
- Family: Phyllobacteriaceae
- Genus: Marinobacter
- Species: M. arcticus

Binomial name
- Marinobacter arcticus Gauthier, Lafay, Christen, Fernandez, Acquaviva, Bonin & Bertrand, 1992

Synonyms
- Marinobacter articus

Species of bacterium

Marinobacter arcticus is a bacterium from the genus of Marinobacter.
