= Aquamicrobium aestuarii =

Scientific classification
- Domain: Bacteria
- Kingdom: Pseudomonadati
- Phylum: Pseudomonadota
- Class: Alphaproteobacteria
- Order: Hyphomicrobiales
- Family: Phyllobacteriaceae
- Genus: Aquamicrobium
- Species: A. aestuarii

Binomial name
- Aquamicrobium aestuarii Jin et al. 2013

Type strain
- G210, JCM 16876, KACC 14931

Species of bacterium

Aquamicrobium aestuarii is a gram-negative, catalase- and oxidase-positive strictly aerobic, motile bacteria with a flagellum from the genus Aquamicrobium which was isolated from the Yellow Sea in South Korea.
