= Marinobacter lipolyticus =

Scientific classification
- Domain: Bacteria
- Kingdom: Pseudomonadati
- Phylum: Pseudomonadota
- Class: Alphaproteobacteria
- Order: Hyphomicrobiales
- Family: Phyllobacteriaceae
- Genus: Marinobacter
- Species: M. lipolyticus

Binomial name
- Marinobacter lipolyticus Martín et al. 2003

Species of bacterium

Marinobacter lipolyticus is a moderate halophile with lipolytic activity. It is Gram-negative and rod-shaped, with type strain SM19^{T} (=DSM 15157^{T} =NCIMB 13907^{T} =CIP 107627^{T} =CCM 7048^{T}).

== Genome ==
The genome of Marinobacter lipolyticius is thought to be 4Mb with a 57.0% G+C content, and 3,646 putatative ORFs.
