= Marinobacter zhanjiangensis =

Scientific classification
- Domain: Bacteria
- Kingdom: Pseudomonadati
- Phylum: Pseudomonadota
- Class: Alphaproteobacteria
- Order: Hyphomicrobiales
- Family: Phyllobacteriaceae
- Genus: Marinobacter
- Species: M. zhanjiangensis

Binomial name
- Marinobacter zhanjiangensis Zhuang et al. 2012

Type strain
- CCTCC AB 208029, DSM 21077, JSM 078120, KCTC 22280

Species of bacterium

Marinobacter zhanjiangensis is a Gram-negative, aerobic and non-spore-forming bacterium from the genus of Marinobacter which has been isolated from tidal flat from the water from the South China Sea near the Naozhou Island in China.
