= Marinobacter salsuginis =

Scientific classification
- Domain: Bacteria
- Kingdom: Pseudomonadati
- Phylum: Pseudomonadota
- Class: Alphaproteobacteria
- Order: Hyphomicrobiales
- Family: Phyllobacteriaceae
- Genus: Marinobacter
- Species: M. salsuginis

Binomial name
- Marinobacter salsuginis Antunes et al. 2007

Type strain
- CIP 109893, DSM 18347, LMG 23697, SD-14B, BS2

Synonyms
- Marinobacter halosydne

Species of bacterium

Marinobacter salsuginis is a Gram-negative and moderately halophilic bacterium from the genus of Marinobacter which has been isolated from seawater from the Shaban Deep from the Red Sea. The strain BS2 of Marinobacter salsuginis can reduce the mortality of the shrimps Penaeus monodon and Litopenaeus vannamei by killing the dinoflagellate Noctiluca scintillans. The strain 5N-3 can degrade 1,2-Dichloroethene (cis-DCE) in the absence of inducing substrates like phenol.[6]
