= Marinobacter antarcticus =

Scientific classification
- Domain: Bacteria
- Kingdom: Pseudomonadati
- Phylum: Pseudomonadota
- Class: Alphaproteobacteria
- Order: Hyphomicrobiales
- Family: Phyllobacteriaceae
- Genus: Marinobacter
- Species: M. antarcticus

Binomial name
- Marinobacter antarcticus Liu et al. 2012

Type strain
- CGMCC 1.10835, KCTC 23684, ZS2-30

Species of bacterium

Marinobacter antarcticus is a Gram-negative, aerobic, halotolerant, rod-shaped and motile bacterium from the genus of Marinobacter which has been isolated from Antarctic sediments.
