= Nitratireductor basaltis =

Scientific classification
- Domain: Bacteria
- Kingdom: Pseudomonadati
- Phylum: Pseudomonadota
- Class: Alphaproteobacteria
- Order: Hyphomicrobiales
- Family: Phyllobacteriaceae
- Genus: Nitratireductor
- Species: N. basaltis

Binomial name
- Nitratireductor basaltis Kim et al. 2009

Type strain
- J3, JCM 14935, KCTC 22119

Species of bacterium

Nitratireductor basaltis is a Gram-negative, oxidase- and catalase-positive bacteria from the genus of Nitratireductor which was isolated from black sand from the Soesoggak beach on the Jeju Island in South Korea.
