= Marinobacter excellens =

Scientific classification
- Domain: Bacteria
- Kingdom: Pseudomonadati
- Phylum: Pseudomonadota
- Class: Alphaproteobacteria
- Order: Hyphomicrobiales
- Family: Phyllobacteriaceae
- Genus: Marinobacter
- Species: M. excellens

Binomial name
- Marinobacter excellens Gorshkova et al. 2003

Type strain
- CIP 107686, KMM 3809

Synonyms
- Marinobacter excelentus

Species of bacterium

Marinobacter excellens is a Gram-negative and halophilic bacterium from the genus of Marinobacter which has been isolated from sediments from the Chazhma Bay from the Sea of Japan.
