= Chelativorans intermedius =

Scientific classification
- Domain: Bacteria
- Kingdom: Pseudomonadati
- Phylum: Pseudomonadota
- Class: Alphaproteobacteria
- Order: Hyphomicrobiales
- Family: Phyllobacteriaceae
- Genus: Chelativorans
- Species: C. intermedius

Binomial name
- Chelativorans intermedius Kämpfer et al. 2015

Type strain
- CCM 8543, CIP 110825, A1392, CC-MHSW-5, DSM 29391, LMG 28482

Species of bacterium

Chelativorans intermedius is a Gram-negative, non-spore-forming and rod-shaped bacteria from the genus of Chelativorans which has been isolated from water from a coastal hot spring on the Green Island on Taiwan.
