= Bryopsidella ostreobiformis =

Scientific classification
- Clade: Viridiplantae
- Division: Chlorophyta
- Class: Ulvophyceae
- Order: Bryopsidales
- Family: Bryopsidaceae
- Genus: Bryopsidella
- Species: B. ostreobiformis

Binomial name
- Bryopsidella ostreobiformis Calderon-Saenz and Schnetter

Species of alga

Bryopsidella ostreobiformis is a species of green alga from Croatia.
