= Marinobacter squalenivorans =

Scientific classification
- Domain: Bacteria
- Kingdom: Pseudomonadati
- Phylum: Pseudomonadota
- Class: Alphaproteobacteria
- Order: Hyphomicrobiales
- Family: Phyllobacteriaceae
- Genus: Marinobacter
- Species: M. squalenivorans

Binomial name
- Marinobacter squalenivorans Rontani et al. 2003

Type strain
- 2Asq64

Species of bacterium

Marinobacter squalenivorans is a bacterium from the genus of Marinobacter which can metabolize shark oil.
