= Aminobacter aminovorans =

Scientific classification
- Domain: Bacteria
- Kingdom: Pseudomonadati
- Phylum: Pseudomonadota
- Class: Alphaproteobacteria
- Order: Hyphomicrobiales
- Family: Phyllobacteriaceae
- Genus: Aminobacter
- Species: A. aminovorans

Binomial name
- Aminobacter aminovorans (den Dooren de Jong 1926); Urakami et al. 1992

Synonyms
- Pseudomonas aminovorans den Dooren de Jong 1926; Chelatobacter heintzii Auling et al. 1993

Species of bacterium

Aminobacter aminovorans is a species of Gram-negative soil bacteria.
