= Marinobacter algicola =

Scientific classification
- Domain: Bacteria
- Kingdom: Pseudomonadati
- Phylum: Pseudomonadota
- Class: Alphaproteobacteria
- Order: Hyphomicrobiales
- Family: Phyllobacteriaceae
- Genus: Marinobacter
- Species: M. algicola

Binomial name
- Marinobacter algicola Green et al. 2006

Type strain
- CIP 109780, DG893, DSM 16394, LMG 23835, NCIMB 14009

Species of bacterium

Marinobacter algicola is a Gram-negative, aerobic and moderately halophilic bactebacterium from the genus of Marinobacter which has been isolated from the dinoflagellate Gymnodinium catenatum in Scotland.
