= Marinobacter daepoensis =

Scientific classification
- Domain: Bacteria
- Kingdom: Pseudomonadati
- Phylum: Pseudomonadota
- Class: Alphaproteobacteria
- Order: Hyphomicrobiales
- Family: Phyllobacteriaceae
- Genus: Marinobacter
- Species: M. daepoensis

Binomial name
- Marinobacter daepoensis Yoon et al. 2004

Type strain
- CIP 108614, DSM 16072, JCM 12324, KCTC 12184, SW-156

Species of bacterium

Marinobacter daepoensis is a Gram-negative, non-spore-forming, slightly halophilic and motile bacterium from the genus of Marinobacter which has been isolated from sea water from the Yellow Sea in Korea.
