= Marinobacter vinifirmus =

Scientific classification
- Domain: Bacteria
- Kingdom: Pseudomonadati
- Phylum: Pseudomonadota
- Class: Alphaproteobacteria
- Order: Hyphomicrobiales
- Family: Phyllobacteriaceae
- Genus: Marinobacter
- Species: M. vinifirmus

Binomial name
- Marinobacter vinifirmus Liebgott et al. 2006

Type strain
- CCUG 52119, CIP 109495, DSM 17747, FB1

Synonyms
- Marinobacter vinulentus

Species of bacterium

Marinobacter vinifirmus is a Gram-negative, moderately halophilic, non-spore-forming and motile bacterium from the genus of Marinobacter which has been isolated from wine-barrel-decalcification wastewater in France.
