= Marinobacter litoralis =

Scientific classification
- Domain: Bacteria
- Kingdom: Pseudomonadati
- Phylum: Pseudomonadota
- Class: Alphaproteobacteria
- Order: Hyphomicrobiales
- Family: Phyllobacteriaceae
- Genus: Marinobacter
- Species: M. litoralis

Binomial name
- Marinobacter litoralis Yoon et al. 2003

Type strain
- JCM 11547, KCCM 41591, SW-45

Synonyms
- Marinobacter marinus

Species of bacterium

Marinobacter litoralis is a Gram-negative, non-spore-forming, moderately halophilic and motile bacterium from the genus of Marinobacter which has been isolated from sea water from the Sea of Japan.
