= Marinobacter bryozoorum =

Scientific classification
- Domain: Bacteria
- Kingdom: Pseudomonadati
- Phylum: Pseudomonadota
- Class: Alphaproteobacteria
- Order: Hyphomicrobiales
- Family: Phyllobacteriaceae
- Genus: Marinobacter
- Species: M. bryozoorum

Binomial name
- Marinobacter bryozoorum Romanenko et al. 2005

Species of bacterium

Marinobacter bryozoorum is a marine, Gram-negative, aerobic and halophilic bacteria with type strain KMM 3840^{T} (=50-11^{T} =DSM 15401^{T}).
