= Nitratireductor aquimarinus =

Scientific classification
- Domain: Bacteria
- Kingdom: Pseudomonadati
- Phylum: Pseudomonadota
- Class: Alphaproteobacteria
- Order: Hyphomicrobiales
- Family: Phyllobacteriaceae
- Genus: Nitratireductor
- Species: N. aquimarinus

Binomial name
- Nitratireductor aquimarinus Jang et al. 2011

Type strain
- CL-SC21, JCM 17288, KCCM 90090

Species of bacterium

Nitratireductor aquimarinus is a Gram-negative, aerobic bacteria from the genus of Nitratireductor which was isolated from Skeletonema costatum from the Sea of Japan.
