= Pseudaminobacter salicylatoxidans =

Scientific classification
- Domain: Bacteria
- Kingdom: Pseudomonadati
- Phylum: Pseudomonadota
- Class: Alphaproteobacteria
- Order: Hyphomicrobiales
- Family: Phyllobacteriaceae
- Genus: Pseudaminobacter
- Species: P. salicylatoxidans

Binomial name
- Pseudaminobacter salicylatoxidans Kämpfer et al. 1999

Species of bacterium

Pseudaminobacter salicylatoxidans is a Gram-negative, oxidase-positive, rod-shaped, motile bacteria from the genus of Pseudaminobacter which has the ability to oxidizes salicylate.
