= Chelativorans multitrophicus =

Scientific classification
- Domain: Bacteria
- Kingdom: Pseudomonadati
- Phylum: Pseudomonadota
- Class: Alphaproteobacteria
- Order: Hyphomicrobiales
- Family: Phyllobacteriaceae
- Genus: Chelativorans
- Species: C. multitrophicus

Binomial name
- Chelativorans multitrophicus Doronina et al. 2010

Type strain
- DSM 9103, VKM B-2394

Species of bacterium

Chelativorans multitrophicus is a Gram-negative, aerobic, non-motile bacteria from the genus of Chelativorans which was isolated from soil of activated sludge from industrial wastewater treatment plants in Switzerland . Chelativorans multitrophicus has the ability to degrade EDTA.
