= B. maritimus =

B. maritimus may refer to:

- Bolboschoenus maritimus, a bulrush species
- Bromus maritimus, the seaside brome, a plant species

== See also ==
- Maritimus (disambiguation)
