= Nitratireductor lacus =

Scientific classification
- Domain: Bacteria
- Kingdom: Pseudomonadati
- Phylum: Pseudomonadota
- Class: Alphaproteobacteria
- Order: Hyphomicrobiales
- Family: Phyllobacteriaceae
- Genus: Nitratireductor
- Species: N. lacus

Binomial name
- Nitratireductor lacus Yu et al. 2016

Type strain
- KCTC 52186, MCCC 1K02481, GSS14

Species of bacterium

Nitratireductor lacus is a Gram-negative bacteria from the genus of Nitratireductor which has been isolated from the Yuncheng Salt Lake in China.
