= Roseitalea porphyridii =

Scientific classification
- Domain: Bacteria
- Kingdom: Pseudomonadati
- Phylum: Pseudomonadota
- Class: Alphaproteobacteria
- Order: Hyphomicrobiales
- Family: Phyllobacteriaceae
- Genus: Roseitalea
- Species: R. porphyridii

Binomial name
- Roseitalea porphyridii Hyeon et al. 2017

Type strain
- JCM 31538, KACC 18807, MA7-20

Species of bacterium

Roseitalea porphyridii is a Gram-negative and strictly aerobic bacterium from the genus Roseitalea that has been isolated from the alga Porphyridium marinum in Korea.
