= N. maritimus =

N. maritimus may refer to:

- Nicrophorus maritimus, a synonym for Nicrophorus investigator, a burying beetle
- Nitrosopumilus maritimus, an extremely common archaeon species living in seawater

== See also ==
- Maritimus (disambiguation)
