= Marinobacter szutsaonensis =

Scientific classification
- Domain: Bacteria
- Kingdom: Pseudomonadati
- Phylum: Pseudomonadota
- Class: Alphaproteobacteria
- Order: Hyphomicrobiales
- Family: Phyllobacteriaceae
- Genus: Marinobacter
- Species: M. szutsaonensis

Binomial name
- Marinobacter szutsaonensis Wang et al. 2009

Type strain
- BCRC 17809, CGMCC 1.7011, JCM 15751, NTU-104

Species of bacterium

Marinobacter szutsaonensis is a Gram-negative, aerobic and non-spore-forming bacterium from the genus of Marinobacter which has been isolated from the saltern of Szutsao in Taiwan.
