= Marinobacter halotolerans =

Scientific classification
- Domain: Bacteria
- Kingdom: Pseudomonadati
- Phylum: Pseudomonadota
- Class: Alphaproteobacteria
- Order: Hyphomicrobiales
- Family: Phyllobacteriaceae
- Genus: Marinobacter
- Species: M. halotolerans

Binomial name
- Marinobacter halotolerans Kim et al. 2017

Species of bacterium

Marinobacter halotolerans is a Gram-negative, moderately halophilic and motile bacterium from the genus of Marinobacter which has been isolated from the Yellow Sea on Korea.
