= Pseudaminobacter defluvii =

Scientific classification
- Domain: Bacteria
- Kingdom: Pseudomonadati
- Phylum: Pseudomonadota
- Class: Alphaproteobacteria
- Order: Hyphomicrobiales
- Family: Phyllobacteriaceae
- Genus: Pseudaminobacter
- Species: P. defluvii

Binomial name
- Pseudaminobacter defluvii Kämpfer et al. 1999

Type strain
- CIP 107185, IAM 12817, IFO 14570, JCM 20757, KCTC 2844, KCTC 2849, NBRC 14570, NCIMB 13842, THI 051

Synonyms
- Pseudoaminobacter defluvii

Species of bacterium

Pseudaminobacter defluvii is a Gram-negative, oxidase-positive, rod-shaped, motile bacteria from the genus of Pseudaminobacter.
