= Marinobacter segnicrescens =

Scientific classification
- Domain: Bacteria
- Kingdom: Pseudomonadati
- Phylum: Pseudomonadota
- Class: Alphaproteobacteria
- Order: Hyphomicrobiales
- Family: Phyllobacteriaceae
- Genus: Marinobacter
- Species: M. segnicrescens

Binomial name
- Marinobacter segnicrescens Guo et al. 2007

Type strain
- CGMCC 1.6489, LMG 23928, SS011B1-4

Synonyms
- Marinobacter segnegenens

Species of Gammaproteobacteria

Marinobacter segnicrescens is a Gram-negative, non-spore-forming, ellipsoid-shaped, moderately halophilic and motile bacterium from the genus of Marinobacter which has been isolated from sediments from the South China Sea.
