= Aminobacter aganoensis =

Scientific classification
- Domain: Bacteria
- Kingdom: Pseudomonadati
- Phylum: Pseudomonadota
- Class: Alphaproteobacteria
- Order: Hyphomicrobiales
- Family: Phyllobacteriaceae
- Genus: Aminobacter
- Species: A. aganoensis

Binomial name
- Aminobacter aganoensis Urakami et al. 1992

Type strain
- ATCC 49933, CCM 4328, DSM 7051, IAM 15266, JCM 7854, KACC 10886, KACC 11261, strain TH-3

Species of bacterium

Aminobacter aganoensis is a species of gram-negative bacterium from the genus of Aminobacter which was isolated from soil.
