= Ahrensia =

Scientific classification
- Domain: Bacteria
- Kingdom: Pseudomonadati
- Phylum: Pseudomonadota
- Class: Alphaproteobacteria
- Order: Hyphomicrobiales
- Family: Ahrensiaceae
- Genus: Ahrensia; Uchino et al. 1999
- Species: A. kielensis

Binomial name
- Ahrensia kielensis (ex Ahrens 1968) Uchino et al. 1999

Synonyms
- "Agrobacterium kieliense" Ahrens 1968; Ahrensia kieliense Uchino et al. 1999

Genus of bacteria

Ahrensia is a genus of bacteria in the order Hyphomicrobiales. Ahrensia is named after the German microbiologist R. Ahrens. The cells are rod-shaped and motile. They are strictly aerobic.

== See also ==
- List of bacterial genera named after personal names
