= Ahrensiaceae =

Scientific classification
- Domain: Bacteria
- Kingdom: Pseudomonadati
- Phylum: Pseudomonadota
- Class: Alphaproteobacteria
- Order: Hyphomicrobiales
- Family: Ahrensiaceae; Hördt et al. 2020

Genera
- Ahrensia Uchino et al. 1999; Oceaniradius Jeong et al. 2019; Oricola Hameed et al. 2015; Pseudahrensia Jung et al. 2012; Roseitalea Hyeon et al. 2017

Family of bacteria

Ahrensiaceae is a family of Alphaproteobacteria.
