= Pseudaminobacter =

Scientific classification
- Domain: Bacteria
- Kingdom: Pseudomonadati
- Phylum: Pseudomonadota
- Class: Alphaproteobacteria
- Order: Hyphomicrobiales
- Family: Phyllobacteriaceae
- Genus: Pseudaminobacter; Kämpfer et al. 1999

Type species
- Pseudaminobacter salicylatoxidans

Species
- Pseudaminobacter arsenicus Mu et al. 2019; Pseudaminobacter defluvii Kämpfer et al. 1999; Pseudaminobacter granuli Hahn et al. 2019; Pseudaminobacter manganicus Li et al. 2017; Pseudaminobacter salicylatoxidans Kämpfer et al. 1999

Genus of bacteria

Pseudaminobacter is a genus of Gram-negative, oxidase- and catalase-positive, rod-shaped bacteria.
