= Petrobactin =

Names
- Preferred IUPAC name 4-[4-[3-[(3,4-dihydroxybenzoyl)amino]propylamino]butylamino]-2-[2-[4-[3-[(3,4-dihydroxybenzoyl)amino]propylamino]butylamino]-2-oxoethyl]-2-hydroxy-4-oxobutanoic acid

Identifiers
CAS Number	545434-89-7
3D model (JSmol)	Interactive image; H^{+}: Interactive image
ChEBI	H^{+}: CHEBI:142778
ChemSpider	9586399
KEGG	C22273
PubChem CID	11411510
- InChI: InChI=1S/C34H50N6O11/c41-25-9-7-23(19-27(25)43)31(47)39-17-5-13-35-11-1-3-15-37-29(45)21-34(51,33(49)50)22-30(46)38-16-4-2-12-36-14-6-18-40-32(48)24-8-10-26(42)28(44)20-24/h7-10,19-20,35-36,41-44,51H,1-6,11-18,21-22H2,(H,37,45)(H,38,46)(H,39,47)(H,40,48)(H,49,50) Key: GKIMOVAPSAVJHZ-UHFFFAOYSA-N; H^{+}: InChI=1S/C34H50N6O11/c41-25-9-7-23(19-27(25)43)31(47)39-15-3-1-11-35-13-5-17-37-29(45)21-34(51,33(49)50)22-30(46)38-18-6-14-36-12-2-4-16-40-32(48)24-8-10-26(42)28(44)20-24/h7-10,19-20,35-36,41-44,51H,1-6,11-18,21-22H2,(H,37,45)(H,38,46)(H,39,47)(H,40,48)(H,49,50)/p+1 Key: SESZZOOISCLDTE-UHFFFAOYSA-O
- SMILES: C1=CC(=C(C=C1C(=O)NCCCNCCCCNC(=O)CC(CC(=O)NCCCCNCCCNC(=O)C2=CC(=C(C=C2)O)O)(C(=O)O)O)O)O; H^{+}: C(=O)([O-])C(CC(=O)NCCC[NH2+]CCCCNC(C1=CC=C(C(=C1)O)O)=O)(CC(=O)NCCC[NH2+]CCCCNC(C2=CC=C(C(=C2)O)O)=O)O

Properties
Chemical formula	C_{34}H_{50}N_{6}O_{11}
Molar mass	718.79 g·mol^{−1}
- Except where otherwise noted, data are given for materials in their standard state (at 25 °C [77 °F], 100 kPa). Infobox references

Petrobactin is a metal-binding natural product used for iron acquisition by Bacillus anthracis, the pathogen that causes anthrax, as well as in other bacterial species such as Marinobacter hydrocarbonoclasticus, and Alteromonas macleodii. It is of the bis-catechol (3,4-dihydroxybenzoyl) class of such siderophores. As with others in this class, petrobactin serves as a highly specific iron(III) transport ligand, and contributes to marine microbial uptake of environmental iron.

The iron-chelated petrobactin complex readily undergoes an uncatalysed, light-mediated decarboxylation—a photo-oxidation—of its metal-associated secondary carboxylic acid-group, resulting in the concommitant reduction of iron(III) to biologically useful iron(II).

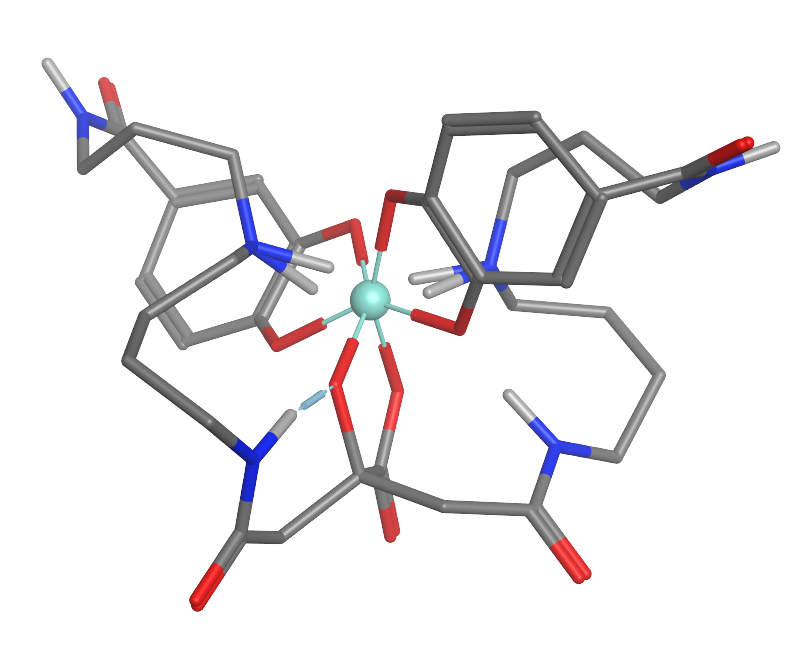
3D structure of petrobactin-iron complex generated with OPLS-AA forcefield in MOE.

== Biological function ==
Like other siderophores, petrobactin is secreted by pathogenic bacterium infecting animals. In the case of B. anthracis, petrobactin is used to acquire iron from its host.

The yclNOPQ operon is required for the utilization of petrobactin.

Orthologs of this operon likely contribute to the pathogenicity of Bacilli species.

== Mechanism of action ==
The 3,4-catecholate moieties of Bacillus petrobactin, terminal in the ligand, do not improve iron(III) affinity (relative to other siderophores with hydroxamate moieties); rather, they increase the rate of at which ferric iron is extracted from human transferrin.

== Biosynthesis ==
In B. anthracis, petrobactin is produced by a nonribosomal peptide synthetase independent siderophore (NIS) synthetase pathway, in a pathway termed "Asb" for "anthrax siderophore biosynthesis", based on the organism of its original characterisation.

Biosynthesis of petrobactin in Bacillus anthracis. Reconstruction of figure 1C in Nusca, Tyler D. (2012). Abbreviations used: ATP, AMP, PP_{i}.

As indicated in the figure, biosynthesis in B. anthracis procedes with ATP-dependent, AsbA-mediated amide formation between a primary carboxylate of citric acid, and the terminal primary amine of the butane-1,4-diamine portion of spermidine, via displacement reaction of an acylphosphate intermediate by the primary amino-group. Separately, 3,4-dihydroxybenzoic acid is produced by AsbF from 3-dehydroshikimic acid, and this benzoic acid is used to produce a thioester intermediate with a cysteine residue of AsbD, a further ATP-dependent reaction catalysed by AsbC.

From the citroyl-spermidine biosynthetic intermediate (AsbA reaction product), the process can proceed in one of two ways, either with (i) AsbB-mediated installation of a second spermidine moiety at the remaining free primary carboxylate of the AsbA product to give a symmetric bis-spermidyl-citrate, followed by sequential AsbE-catalysed installations, from AsbD-thioesters, of two 3,4-dihydroxybenzoyl moieties, as amides, at the two free primary amines of the AsbB product; or, (ii) altering this order of reactions in first catalysing attachment of one AsbD-thioester-derived 3,4-dihydroxybenzoyl moiety by AsbE, then in performing the AsbB-catalysed attachment of the second spermidine moiety by its butane-1,4-diamine portion, followed (again) by AsbE-catalysed addition of the second AsbD-thioester-derived 3,4-dihydroxybenzoyl moiety. In both of these variant reaction sequences, the AsbB-mediated amide-forming reactions are ATP-dependent, and the AsbE-mediated benzoylation reactions regenerate the free cysteinyl-thiol form of AsbD. From both reaction sequences, the product is petrobactin, a symmetric citric acid derivative with 3,4-dihydroxybenzoyl-spermidine moieties attached to each of its primary carboxylic acids.

=== Comparative bacterial genomics ===
The gene cluster encoding the Asb proteins in B. anthracis presents the individual genes in alphabetical order, AsbA through AsbF, an order identical to that seen in M. hydrocarbonclasticus biosynthesis of petrobactin. In A. macleodii only the first three genes, encoding the proteins AsbA through AsbC, are identical to B. anthracis; its versions of the genes encoding AsbD and AsbF are non-identical, and longer, and the cluster ends with its gene encoding AsbE, between which lie sequences encoding a PepSY domain, and sequences for two hypothetical protein domains.
