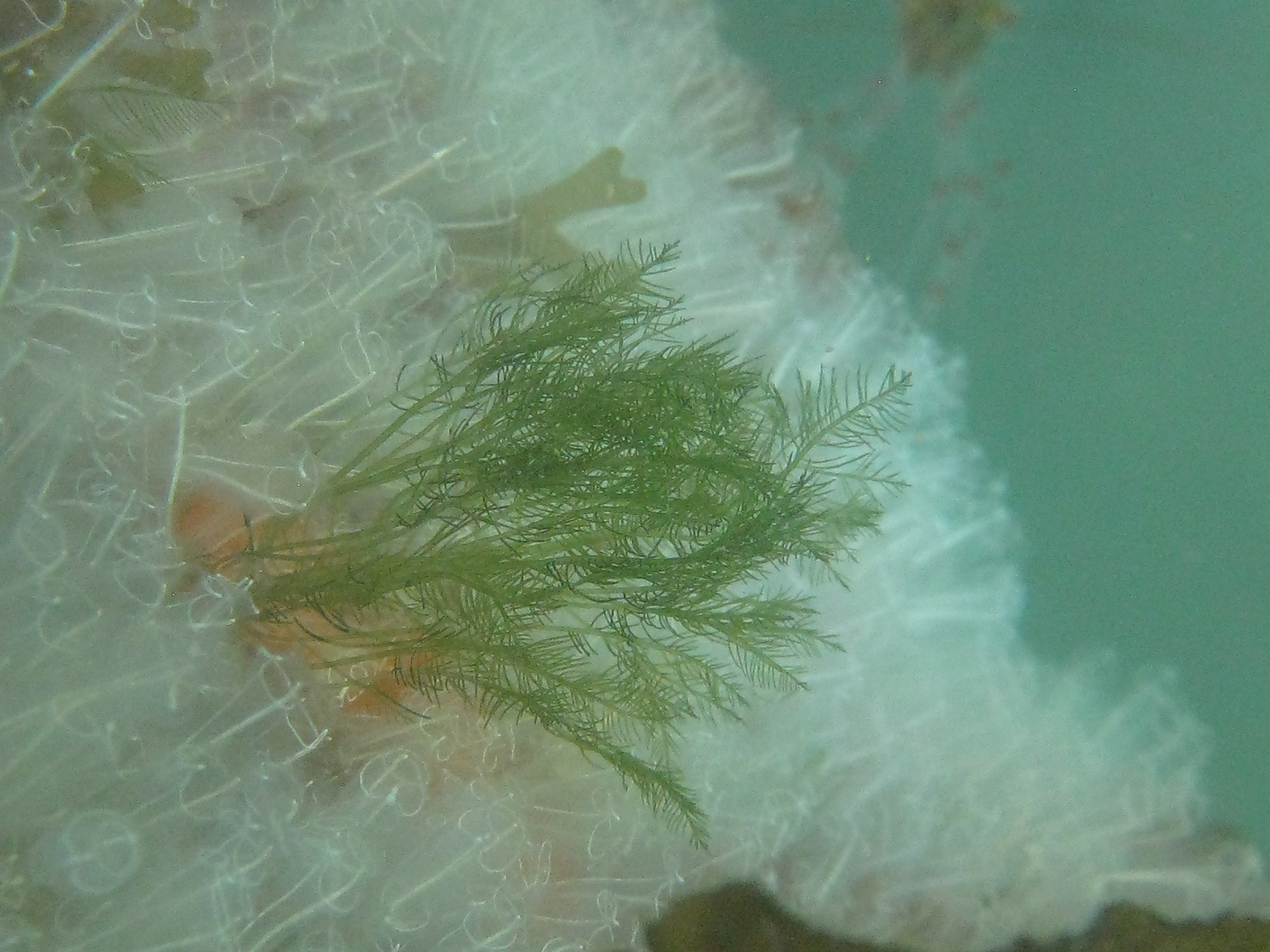
- Bryopsis plumosa (the green organism in the centre)

Scientific classification
- Kingdom: Plantae
- Division: Chlorophyta
- Class: Ulvophyceae
- Order: Bryopsidales
- Family: Bryopsidaceae
- Genus: Bryopsis
- Species: B. plumosa

Binomial name
- Bryopsis plumosa (Hudson) C.Agardh, 1823

Synonyms
- Bryopsis arbuscula Conferva tenax (Roth, 1806); Ulva plumosa (Hudson, 1778)

= Bryopsis plumosa =

Species of alga

Bryopsis plumosa, sometimes known by the common names green algae or hen pen, is a type of green seaweed.

== Taxonomy ==
This species was originally described by William Hudson under the name Ulva plumosa.

== Distribution ==
Bryopsis plumosa is found in the British Isles, Europe, the Mediterranean Sea and the Black Sea, Azores, Portugal, Spain, France, Norway, Faroes and Iceland, on the Atlantic coast of North America, west coast of Greenland, Jamaica, Canary Islands, Senegal, Ghana, Mauritania, South Africa, British Columbia to California, Australia, Japan and New Zealand.

== Description ==
Bryopsis plumosa has distichous branches with a thallus that is small and erect, growing up to 10 cm long. It is coloured bright green and has a soft, silky texture. The branches arranged in two opposite rows.

== Reproduction ==
The species is dioecious; when fertile the male plants turn yellowish-green and the female plants are dark green.

== Ecology ==
It can be found in intertidal pools.

== Similar species ==
Bryopsis hypnoides can be difficult to distinguish, the branches of B. hypnoides are arranged spirally or irregularly.
