= Aliihoeflea =

Scientific classification
- Domain: Bacteria
- Kingdom: Pseudomonadati
- Phylum: Pseudomonadota
- Class: Alphaproteobacteria
- Order: Hyphomicrobiales
- Family: Phyllobacteriaceae
- Genus: Aliihoeflea; Roh et al. 2008

Species
- "A. aestuarii"

Genus of bacteria

"Aliihoeflea" is a genus of bacteria from the family of Phyllobacteriaceae with one known species ("Aliihoeflea aestuarii").
