= Corticibacterium =

Scientific classification
- Domain: Bacteria
- Kingdom: Pseudomonadati
- Phylum: Pseudomonadota
- Class: Alphaproteobacteria
- Order: Hyphomicrobiales
- Family: Phyllobacteriaceae
- Genus: Corticibacterium; Li et al. 2016

Type species
- Corticibacterium populi

Species
- C. populi

Genus of bacteria

Corticibacterium is a genus of gram-negative bacteria from the family Phyllobacteriaceae with one known species (Corticibacterium populi).
