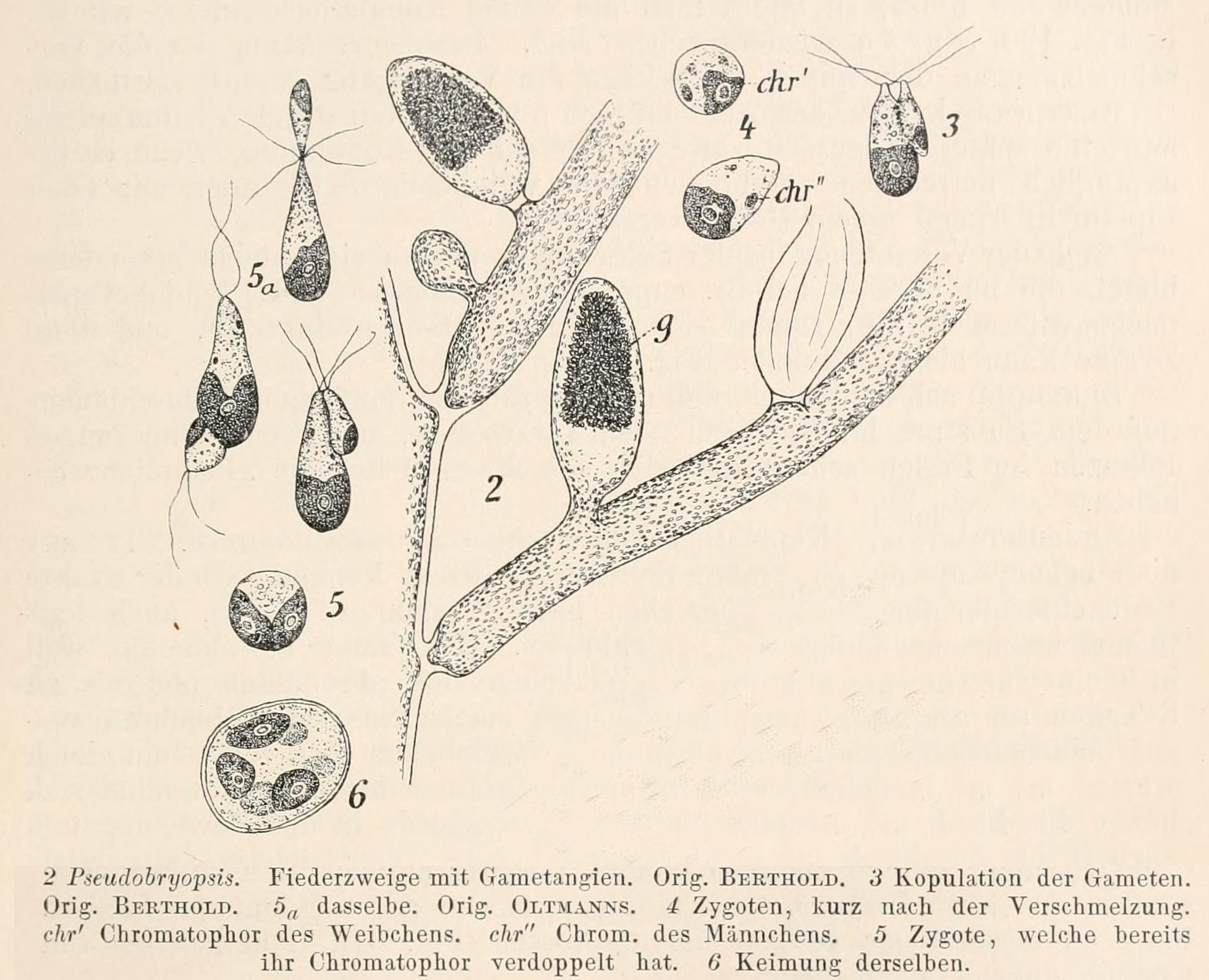

Scientific classification
- Clade: Viridiplantae
- Division: Chlorophyta
- Class: Ulvophyceae
- Order: Bryopsidales
- Family: Bryopsidaceae
- Genus: Pseudobryopsis; Berthold in Oltmanns, 1904

Type species
- Pseudobryopsis myura (J. Agardh) Berthold, 1904

Species
- Pseudobryopsis hainanensis; Pseudobryopsis oahuensis; Pseudobryopsis parva; Pseudobryopsis plantonica

= Pseudobryopsis =

Genus of algae

Pseudobryopsis is a genus of green algae in the family Bryopsidaceae.
