= Pseudohoeflea =

Scientific classification
- Domain: Bacteria
- Kingdom: Pseudomonadati
- Phylum: Pseudomonadota
- Class: Alphaproteobacteria
- Order: Hyphomicrobiales
- Family: Phyllobacteriaceae
- Genus: Pseudohoeflea; Hyeon et al. 2017

Species
- P. coraliihabitans Yu et al. 2024; P. suaedae (Chung et al. 2013) Hyeon et al. 2017

Genus of bacteria

Pseudohoeflea is a genus of bacteria from the family Phyllobacteriaceae with two species.
