= Aminobacter =

Scientific classification
- Domain: Bacteria
- Kingdom: Pseudomonadati
- Phylum: Pseudomonadota
- Class: Alphaproteobacteria
- Order: Hyphomicrobiales
- Family: Phyllobacteriaceae
- Genus: Aminobacter; Urakami et al. 1992

Type species
- Aminobacter aminovorans

Species
- A. aganoensis Urakami et al. 1992; A. aminovorans (den Dooren de Jong 1926) Urakami et al. 1992; A. anthyllidis Maynaud et al. 2013; A. carboxidus (Meyer et al. 1994) Hördt et al. 2020; A. ciceronei McDonald et al. 2005; "A. heintzii" (Auling et al. 1993) Volpiano et al. 2021; A. lissarensis McDonald et al. 2005; A. niigataensis Urakami et al. 1992

Synonyms
- Carbophilus Meyer et al. 1994; Chelatobacter Auling et al. 1993

Genus of bacteria

Aminobacter is a genus of Gram-negative soil bacteria.
