= Maritime English =

Maritime English may refer to:

- Atlantic Canadian English, a Canadian dialect of English
- Standard Marine Communication Phrases, a set of key phrases for use at sea

== See also ==
- Maritime (disambiguation)
