= Salaquimonas =

Scientific classification
- Domain: Bacteria
- Kingdom: Pseudomonadati
- Phylum: Pseudomonadota
- Class: Alphaproteobacteria
- Order: Hyphomicrobiales
- Family: Phyllobacteriaceae
- Genus: Salaquimonas; Kim et al. 2019
- Species: S. pukyongi

Binomial name
- Salaquimonas pukyongi Kim et al. 2019

Genus of bacteria

Salaquimonas pukyongi is a species of bacteria from the family of Phyllobacteriaceae. It is the only member of the genus Salaquimonas.
