= Lambia =

Scientific classification
- Clade: Viridiplantae
- Division: Chlorophyta
- Class: Ulvophyceae
- Order: Bryopsidales
- Family: Bryopsidaceae
- Genus: Lambia; Delépine, 1967

Type species
- Lambia antarctica (Skottsberg) Delépine, 1967

Species
- Lambia antarctica

Genus of algae

Lambia is a genus of green algae in the family Bryopsidaceae.

The genus name of Lambia is in honour of Elke Mackenzie (1911–1990), born as Ivan Mackenzie Lamb, who was a British polar explorer and botanist who specialised in the field of lichenology.

The genus was circumscribed by René Delépine in Compt. Rend. Hebd. Seances Acad. Sci. ser.D, vol.264 on pages 1410 and 1413 in 1967.
