= Pseudoderbesia =

Scientific classification
- Kingdom: Plantae
- Division: Chlorophyta
- Class: Ulvophyceae
- Order: Bryopsidales
- Family: Bryopsidaceae
- Genus: Pseudoderbesia; E. Calderon & Schnetter, 1991

Type species
- Pseudoderbesia arbuscula E. Calderon & Schnetter, 1991

Species
- Pseudoderbesia arbuscula

Genus of algae

Pseudoderbesia is a genus of green algae in the family Bryopsidaceae.
