= Tianweitania =

Scientific classification
- Domain: Bacteria
- Kingdom: Pseudomonadati
- Phylum: Pseudomonadota
- Class: Alphaproteobacteria
- Order: Hyphomicrobiales
- Family: Phyllobacteriaceae
- Genus: Tianweitania; Han et al. 2016

Type species
- Tianweitania sediminis

Genus of bacteria

Tianweitania is a genus of bacteria from the family of Phyllobacteriaceae, with one known species (Tianweitania sediminis). It has been isolated from terrestrial sediments from the Mohe Basin in China.
