= Paramesorhizobium =

Scientific classification
- Domain: Bacteria
- Kingdom: Pseudomonadati
- Phylum: Pseudomonadota
- Class: Alphaproteobacteria
- Order: Hyphomicrobiales
- Family: Phyllobacteriaceae
- Genus: Paramesorhizobium; Luo et al. 2015

Species
- "P. deserti"

Genus of bacteria

"Paramesorhizobium" is a provisional genus of bacteria from the family Phyllobacteriaceae with one known species ("Paramesorhizobium deserti").
