= Aquamicrobium =

Scientific classification
- Domain: Bacteria
- Kingdom: Pseudomonadati
- Phylum: Pseudomonadota
- Class: Alphaproteobacteria
- Order: Hyphomicrobiales
- Family: Phyllobacteriaceae
- Genus: Aquamicrobium; Bambauer et al. 1998

Type species
- Aquamicrobium defluvii Bambauer et al. 1998

Species
- Aquamicrobium aerolatum Kämpfer et al. 2009; Aquamicrobium aestuarii Jin et al. 2013; Aquamicrobium ahrensii Lipski and Kämpfer 2012; Aquamicrobium defluvii Bambauer et al. 1998; Aquamicrobium lusatiense (Fritsche et al. 1999) Kämpfer et al. 2009; Aquamicrobium segne Lipski and Kämpfer 2012; Aquamicrobium soli Xu et al. 2017; Aquamicrobium terrae Wu et al. 2014

Synonyms
- Defluvibacter Yabe et al. 2012

Genus of bacteria

Aquamicrobium is a genus of gram-negative, aerobic bacteria.
