= Chelativorans =

Scientific classification
- Domain: Bacteria
- Kingdom: Pseudomonadati
- Phylum: Pseudomonadota
- Class: Alphaproteobacteria
- Order: Hyphomicrobiales
- Family: Phyllobacteriaceae
- Genus: Chelativorans; Doronina et al. 2010

Type species
- Chelativorans multitrophicus

Species
- C. alearense Meng et al. 2021; C. composti (Yabe et al. 2012) Kämpfer et al. 2015; C. intermedius Kämpfer et al. 2015; C. multitrophicus Doronina et al. 2010; C. oligotrophicus Doronina et al. 2010; C. xinjiangense Meng et al. 2021

Synonyms
- Thermovum Yabe et al. 2012

Genus of bacteria

Chelativorans is a genus of Gram-negative, strictly aerobic, non-motile bacteria.
