= Marinobacter maritimus =

Scientific classification
- Domain: Bacteria
- Kingdom: Pseudomonadati
- Phylum: Pseudomonadota
- Class: Alphaproteobacteria
- Order: Hyphomicrobiales
- Family: Phyllobacteriaceae
- Genus: Marinobacter
- Species: M. maritimus

Binomial name
- Marinobacter maritimus Shivaji et al. 2005

Type strain
- JCM 12521, MTCC 6519, CK 47

Species of bacterium

Marinobacter maritimus is a Gram-negative, psychrotolerant and motile bacterium from the genus of Marinobacter which has been isolated from sea water near the Kerguelen islands.
