= Pseudahrensia =

Scientific classification
- Domain: Bacteria
- Kingdom: Pseudomonadati
- Phylum: Pseudomonadota
- Class: Alphaproteobacteria
- Order: Hyphomicrobiales
- Family: Ahrensiaceae
- Genus: Pseudahrensia; Jung et al. 2012

Type species
- Pseudahrensia aquimaris

Species
- P. aquimaris P. todarodis

Genus of bacteria

Pseudahrensia is a genus of bacteria from the order of Hyphomicrobiales.
