= Nitratireductor =

Scientific classification
- Domain: Bacteria
- Kingdom: Pseudomonadati
- Phylum: Pseudomonadota
- Class: Alphaproteobacteria
- Order: Hyphomicrobiales
- Family: Phyllobacteriaceae
- Genus: Nitratireductor; Labbé et al. 2004

Type species
- Nitratireductor aquibiodomus

Species
- N. aestuarii Ou et al. 2017; N. alexandrii Jiang et al. 2020; N. aquibiodomus Labbé et al. 2004; N. aquimarinus Jang et al. 2011; N. arenosus Baek et al. 2020; N. basaltis Kim et al. 2009; N. indicus Lai et al. 2011; N. kimnyeongensis Kang et al. 2009; N. lacus Yu et al. 2016; N. lucknowense Manickam et al. 2012; N. mangrovi Ye et al. 2020; N. pacificus Lai et al. 2011; N. shengliensis Pan et al. 2014; N. soli Chen et al. 2015

Genus of bacteria

Nitratireductor is a genus of bacteria.
