= Roseitalea =

Scientific classification
- Domain: Bacteria
- Kingdom: Pseudomonadati
- Phylum: Pseudomonadota
- Class: Alphaproteobacteria
- Order: Hyphomicrobiales
- Family: Phyllobacteriaceae
- Genus: Roseitalea; Hyeon et al. 2017

Species
- R. porphyridii

Genus of bacteria

Roseitalea is a genus of bacteria from the family of Phyllobacteriaceae with one known species (Roseitalea porphyridii).
