= Oceaniradius =

Scientific classification
- Domain: Bacteria
- Kingdom: Pseudomonadati
- Phylum: Pseudomonadota
- Class: Alphaproteobacteria
- Order: Hyphomicrobiales
- Family: Ahrensiaceae
- Genus: Oceaniradius; Jeong et al. 2019
- Species: O. stylonematis

Binomial name
- Oceaniradius stylonematis Jeong et al. 2019

Genus of bacteria

Oceaniradius stylonematis is a species of bacteria from the family Ahrensiaceae. It is the only member of the genus Oceaniradius.
