= Oricola (bacterium) =

Scientific classification
- Domain: Bacteria
- Kingdom: Pseudomonadati
- Phylum: Pseudomonadota
- Class: Alphaproteobacteria
- Order: Hyphomicrobiales
- Family: Phyllobacteriaceae
- Genus: Oricola; Hameed et al. 2015

Type species
- Oricola cellulosilytica

Species
- O. cellulosilytica Hameed et al. 2015; O. thermophila Yang et al. 2021

Genus of bacteria

Oricola is a genus of bacteria from the family Phyllobacteriaceae.
