= Maritime =

Maritime may refer to:

== Places ==
- Maritime County, former county of Poland
- Maritime Provinces (Ceylon), an administrative region of British Ceylon 1796–1833
- Maritime Region, Togo
- The Maritimes, or Maritime provinces, a region of Canada consisting of Nova Scotia, New Brunswick, and Prince Edward Island

== Music ==
- Maritime (band), an American indie pop group
- Maritime (album), by Minotaur Shock, 2005
- "Maritime", a song by Isis from the 2002 album Oceanic (Isis album)
- "Maritime", a song by Augury from the 2018 album Illusive Golden Age
- "The Maritimes", a song by Classified from the 2005 album Boy-Cott-In the Industry

== See also ==
- Marine (disambiguation)
- Maritima (disambiguation)
- Maritimum (disambiguation)
- Maritimus (disambiguation)
- Maritime Alps, a mountain range in the southwestern part of the Alps
- Maritime English (disambiguation), the study of human activity at sea
- Maritime museum
- Maritime pilot
- Maritime republics, Italian thalassocratic port cities
- Maritime Southeast Asia
- Maritime transport
