= Trichosolen =

Scientific classification
- Kingdom: Plantae
- Division: Chlorophyta
- Class: Ulvophyceae
- Order: Bryopsidales
- Family: Bryopsidaceae
- Genus: Trichosolen; Montagne, 1861

Type species
- Trichosolen antillarum Montagne, 1861

Species
- Trichosolen blomquistii; Trichosolen duchassaingii; Trichosolen gracilis; Trichosolen longipedicellata; Trichosolen mauritianus; Trichosolen molassensis; Trichosolen mucronatus; Trichosolen myura; Trichosolen pambanensis; Trichosolen papillata; Trichosolen parva; Trichosolen retrorsa; Trichosolen solomonensis; Trichosolen thikkodiensis; Trichosolen venezoleanus

Genus of algae

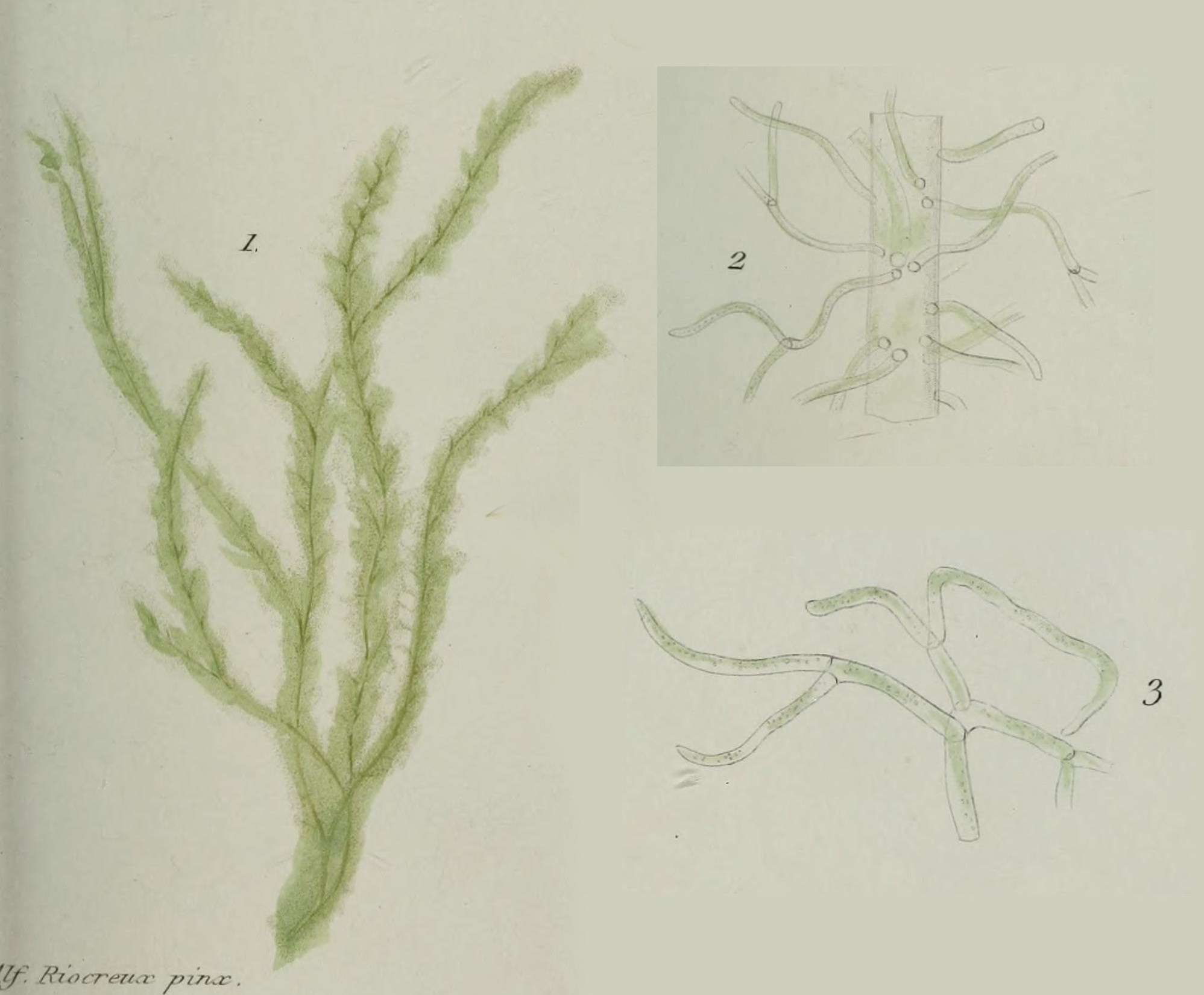
Trichosolen antillarum Montagne/Trichosolen duchassaingii

Trichosolen is a genus of green algae in the family Bryopsidaceae.
