= Bryopsidella =

Scientific classification
- Clade: Viridiplantae
- Division: Chlorophyta
- Class: Ulvophyceae
- Order: Bryopsidales
- Family: Bryopsidaceae
- Genus: Bryopsidella; Feldmann

Species
- Bryopsidella neglecta (Berthold 1880) Rietema 1975; Bryopsidella ostreobiformis Calderón-Sáenz & Schnetter

Genus of algae

Bryopsidella is a genus of green algae in the family Bryopsidaceae.
