= Maritimus =

Maritimus may refer to:

- maritimus, a Latin word commonly used in systematic names
- Maritimus, a Roman cognomen

== See also ==
- , including:
  - Marinobacter maritimus, a Proteobacteria species in the genus Marinobacter found in sea water
  - Ursus maritimus, the polar bear
  - Antechinus minimus maritimus, the swamp antechinus
  - Capricornis sumatraensis maritimus, the Indochinese serow, a vulnerable goat-anteope
  - Raphanus raphanistrum ssp. maritimus, the sea radish
- Maritima (disambiguation)
- Maritime (disambiguation)
- Maritimum (disambiguation)
