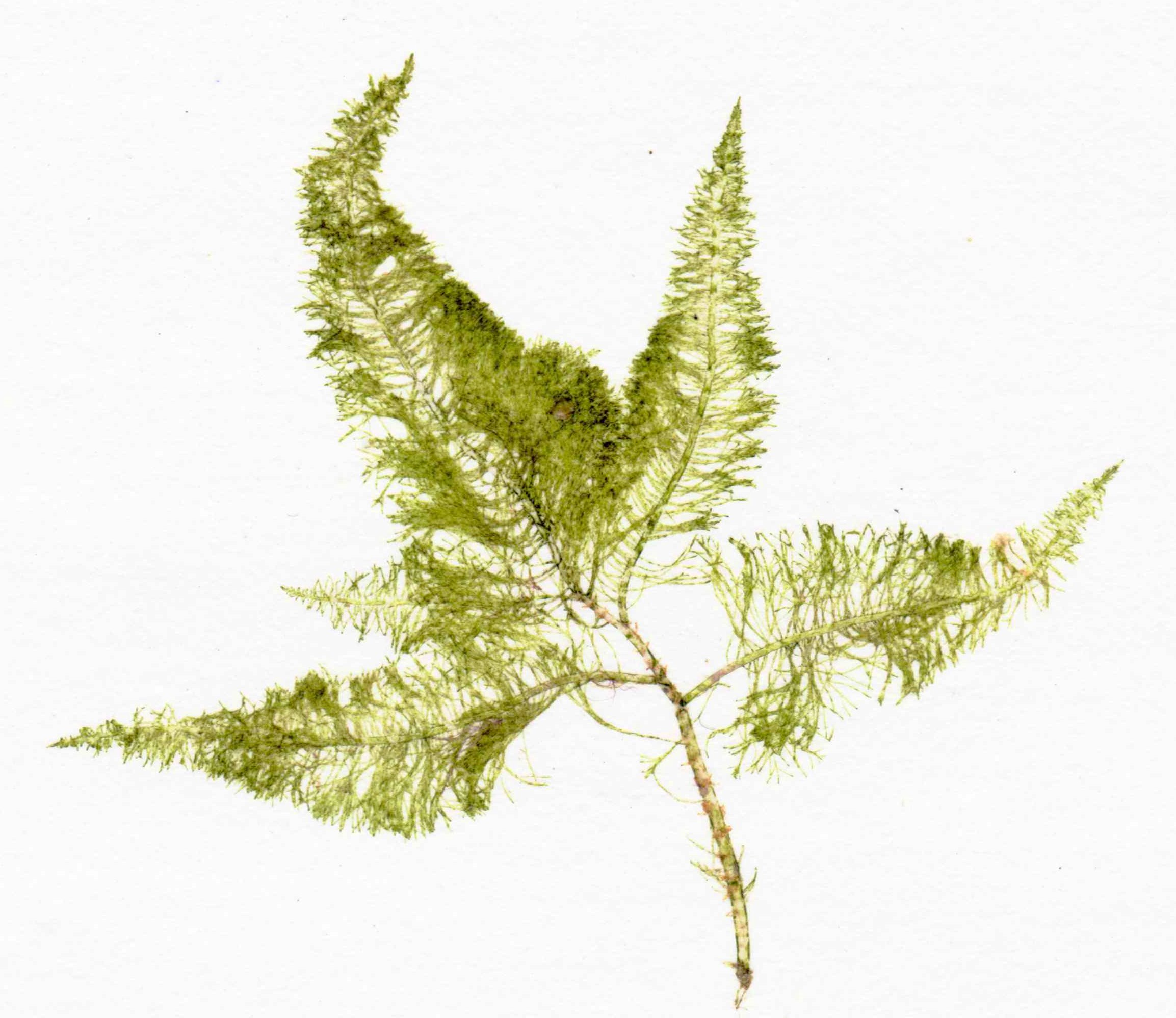
- Bryopsis plumosa collected near Villefranche-sur-Mer, France

Scientific classification
- Kingdom: Plantae
- Division: Chlorophyta
- Class: Ulvophyceae
- Order: Bryopsidales
- Family: Bryopsidaceae; Bory, 1929

Genera
- Bryopsidella; Bryopsis; Lambia; Pseudobryopsis; Pseudoderbesia; Trichosolen

= Bryopsidaceae =

Family of algae

Bryopsidaceae is a family of green algae, in the order Bryopsidales.
