= Phyllobacteriaceae =

Scientific classification
- Domain: Bacteria
- Kingdom: Pseudomonadati
- Phylum: Pseudomonadota
- Class: Alphaproteobacteria
- Order: Hyphomicrobiales
- Family: Phyllobacteriaceae; Mergaert and Swings 2006

Genera
- "Aliihoeflea" Roh et al. 2008; Aminobacter Urakami et al. 1992; Aquamicrobium Bambauer et al. 1998; Chelativorans Doronina et al. 2010; Corticibacterium Li et al. 2016; Mesorhizobium Jarvis et al. 1997; Nitratireductor Labbé et al. 2004; Oceaniradius Jeong et al. 2019; Oricola Hameed et al. 2015; "Paramesorhizobium" Luo et al. 2015; Phyllobacterium (ex Knösel 1962) Knösel 1984; Pseudaminobacter Kämpfer et al. 1999; Pseudohoeflea Hyeon et al. 2017; Roseitalea Hyeon et al. 2017; Salaquimonas Kim et al. 2019; Tianweitania Han et al. 2016

Family of bacteria

The Phyllobacteriaceae are a family of bacteria. The most common genus is Mesorhizobium which contains some of the rhizobia species.

== Phylogeny ==
The currently accepted taxonomy is based on the List of Prokaryotic names with Standing in Nomenclature (LPSN). The phylogeny is based on whole-genome analysis. (Note: Phyllobacterium is not included in this phylogenetic tree.)

- - Phyllobacteriaceae
    - - Pseudohoeflea
      - - Roseitalea
        - Oricola
    - - - - Chelativorans
          - Nitratireductor
        - - - Corticibacterium
            - Tianweitania
          - - Pseudaminobacter
            - - Aminobacter
              - - Aquamicrobium
                - Mesorhizobium
  - outgroup
    Notoacmeibacteraceae
