= Bristol heart scandal =

1990s medical scandal in England

The Bristol heart scandal occurred in England during the 1980s and 1990s. At the Bristol Royal Infirmary, babies died at high rates after cardiac surgery. An inquiry found "staff shortages, a lack of leadership", a unit "simply not up to the task", and "an old boy's culture among doctors, a lax approach to safety, secrecy about doctors' performance and a lack of monitoring by management". The scandal resulted in cardiac surgeons leading efforts to publish more data on the performance of doctors and hospitals. It was the subject of Innocents, a 2000 television drama.

== Concerns raised by Stephen Bolsin ==
Anaesthetist Stephen Bolsin joined the BRI team in 1988 and noticed high surgical mortality rates. As early as 1991, he raised concerns with high-ranking individuals at the trust and also contacted the National Health Service, the Department of Health, and the Royal Colleges. He was largely ignored until 1995, when Joshua Loveday died during a complex heart operation performed by Janardan Dhasmana, who overruled advice from Bolsin. Subsequently, Bolsin emigrated to Australia, where he was praised for raising issues about the mortality rates at BRI and was promoted to professor. He was awarded the Royal College of Anaesthetists Frederic Hewitt Medal in 2013 in recognition of his contribution to patient safety, and received the Medal of the Order of Australia in the 2025 Birthday Honours for service to medicine as an anaesthetist.

== Estimated surgical outcomes ==
In five years (1991–1995), 34 children under one year of age died in the unit, who are believed would have survived in other NHS units. Overall, 170 children died in the Bristol unit between 1986 and 1995 who would have survived in other NHS hospitals, as estimated by Laurence Vick, the lawyer most closely involved in the Bristol scandal. The same expert estimates that 25–30 children suffered permanent brain damage after cardiac surgery by the Bristol surgeons over the same 10-year timespan.

== Public inquiry ==
An investigation – the Bristol Royal Infirmary Inquiry – chaired by Professor Ian Kennedy QC was set up in 1998. It covered the period 1984 to 1995, and was later described as "the biggest public inquiry ever undertaken into the workings of the NHS". The inquiry reported in 2001, concluding that paediatric cardiac surgery services at Bristol were "simply not up to the task" because of shortages of key surgeons and nurses, and a lack of leadership, accountability, and teamwork. It found an 'old boy's culture' among doctors, a lax approach to safety, secrecy about doctors' performance and a lack of monitoring by management. Janardan Dhasmana, one of the surgeons, told the inquiry "Whenever you start any new operation you are bound to have, unfortunately, high mortality".

=== Retention of organs ===
Helen Rickard, the mother of an 11-month-old who died during heart surgery at Bristol in 1992, discovered in 1996 or 1997 that the hospital had kept the baby's heart; she began a campaign and set up a support group for affected parents. Evidence in September 1999 to the Bristol inquiry from Robert Anderson, a heart specialist at Great Ormond Street Hospital, revealed that several hospitals retained some organs from babies who died during surgery, for research and education purposes, often without the consent of the parents; a practice called 'organ harvesting' by the BBC. Anderson mentioned that Alder Hey Children's Hospital in Liverpool held a large number of hearts, and in December 1999 the government set up an inquiry into what became known as the Alder Hey organs scandal.

Outcomes included the setting up in 2001 of the Retained Organs Commission, which arranged for the return of stored organs and made recommendations for improvement in areas including consent, handling of body parts and tissue samples, and post-mortem methods; and revised consent legislation – the Human Tissue Act 2004 – which led to the creation of the Human Tissue Authority.

== Aftermath ==
The scandal accelerated efforts to provide patients with data on the performance of doctors and hospitals. The NHS Plan 2000, published a year earlier, included the establishment of the Commission for Health Improvement which was intended to tackle clinical performance issues.

The General Medical Council found Dhasmana and another surgeon, James Wisheart, guilty of serious professional misconduct for continuing to do two types of complex operation despite high death rates. Wisheart was 'struck off' by the GMC, as was John Roylance, the chief executive of United Bristol Healthcare NHS Trust. Dhasmana, a relatively junior surgeon, was banned from operating on children for three years and lost his job at Bristol Royal Infirmary.

Roylance – a radiologist who was approaching retirement age – stepped down from his chief executive post as the GMC investigation began, amid accusations he had ignored warnings from whistleblower Steve Bolsin. His appointment as OBE, which had been made in 1994, was revoked in 2001.

Four of the parents of children who died in the 1990s in the heart scandal would go on to commit suicide, including Bert Loveday, the father of Joshua Loveday, who after spiralling into depression and crime hanged himself at Winson Green Prison, Birmingham; and in 1994 Andy, partner of campaigner Helen Rickard.

== In media ==
In October 2000, before the public inquiry concluded, Channel 4 broadcast a medical drama titled Innocents. The film was based on interviews with the parents of babies who were operated on, and was part of a short season called "Doctors on Trial".

== Subsequent decline of mortality rates ==
The mortality rate within 30 days of a child's heart operation in the UK fell from 4.3% in 2000 to 2.6% in 2009. Plans to reduce the number of centres performing children's heart surgery have been opposed. A report to NHS England in July 2015 proposed a "three tier" model for all hospitals providing congenital heart disease care. It suggested that they would work within "regional, multi-centre networks, bringing together foetal, children’s and adult services" and noted that since 2001 there "have been subsequent reviews each making a series of recommendations, but no coordinated programme of change, and concerns have remained".

== See also ==
- Alder Hey organs scandal
- Criticism of the National Health Service (England)
- Martha's Rule
- Stafford Hospital scandal
