= Human Transplantation (Wales) Act 2013 =

Human Transplantation (Wales) Act 2013 (Note: Section 22.)
- Act of the National Assembly for Wales
- National Assembly for Wales
- Long title: An Act of the National Assembly for Wales to make provision concerning the consent required for the removal, storage and use of human organs and tissue for the purpose of transplantation; and for connected purposes.
- Citation: 2013 anaw 5
- Introduced by: Lesley Griffiths
- Territorial extent: Wales

Dates
- Royal assent: 10 September 2013
- Commencement: various (Note: Section 21.)

Other legislation
- Amends: Human Tissue Act 2004
- Relates to: Human Tissue Act 2004

Status: Current legislation

Text of statute as originally enacted

Revised text of statute as amended

Text of the Human Transplantation (Wales) Act 2013 as in force today (including any amendments) within the United Kingdom, from legislation.gov.uk.

The Human Transplantation (Wales) Act 2013 (anaw 5) (Welsh: Deddf Trawsblannu Dynol (Cymru) 2013) is an act of the National Assembly for Wales, passed in July 2013. It permits an opt-out system of organ donation, known as presumed consent, or deemed consent. The act allows hospitals to presume that people aged 18 or over, who have been resident in Wales for over 12 months, want to donate their organs at their death, unless they have objected specifically. The act varies the Law of England and Wales in Wales (still applicable in England), which relied on an opt-in system; whereby only those who have signed the NHS organ donation register, or whose families agreed, were considered to have consented to be organ donors.

The law came into effect in 2015, which allowed time for a Welsh Government public information campaign to take effect.

The act is considered by the Welsh Government to be the "most significant piece of legislation" passed in Wales since additional lawmaking powers were acquired by the Assembly in 2011, under the Government of Wales Act 2006.

== Background ==
The Human Tissue Act 2004 (c. 30) consolidated previous legislation in the United Kingdom (excluding Scotland, where the Human Tissue (Scotland) Act 2006 was enacted) and created the Human Tissue Authority to "regulate the removal, storage, use and disposal of human bodies, organs and tissue". Under the act, for organs (hearts, lungs, livers, pancreas and kidneys and corneas) to be available for transplant, a person must consent to their use on an 'opt-in' basis. That is, it is presumed that a person does not want to donate their organs, unless they indicate otherwise by: carrying an organ donation card; joining the NHS organ donation register; writing it down; or telling their relatives.

A 2003 survey by UK Transplant (now part of NHS Blood and Transplant) showed 90 per cent UK public support for organ donation in principle. In practice, however, organ donation was significantly lower, due mainly to the refusal by 40 per cent of relatives to give their consent for donation. In 2008, the UK had one of the lowest organ donation rates in Europe, at 13 donors per million of population (pmp). Spain had the world's highest donor rate, at 35 pmp. Spain's organ donation programme uses the 'opt-out' system, which has led many people, including the Chief Medical Officer for England, Liam Donaldson and the then Prime Minister Gordon Brown, to believe changing to a system of presumed consent would increase the incidence of organ donation in the UK. The Organ Donation Taskforce, set up by the UK Government in 2006, considered Spain's relative success. According to taskforce member, Dr Paul Murphy, "There is an association between countries with presumed consent and higher donation rates, but we could not see that link was a causal one." However, in an article entitled Time to move to presumed consent for organ donation, the British Medical Association argued that "the taskforce did not consider all the relevant evidence, particularly on relatives' refusal rates, and that the current policy, however reinforced, will not substantially increase the number of organs available. By modelling different scenarios, we show that only a policy of presumed consent will substantially increase the number of organs available for transplantation".

A report by the British Medical Association, published in the British Medical Journal in January 2009, found that of the countries studied (Spain, Austria, and Belgium), "all reported an increase in donation rates after the introduction of presumed consent". Nevertheless, the report concluded "Presumed consent alone is unlikely to explain the variation in organ donation rates between countries. Legislation, availability of donors, organisation and infrastructure of the transplantation service, wealth and investment in health care, and public attitudes to and awareness of organ donation may all play a part, but their relative importance is unclear".

In 2008, the charity Kidney Wales Foundation established Opt for Life Cymru, with People Like us Cymru, the Welsh Kidney Patients Association, the British Heart Foundation, the British Lung Foundation, Diabetes Cymru, Cystic Fibrosis and the British Medical Association, to campaign to change the law in Wales to a 'soft opt-out' system of organ donation.

Donation rates improved following the implementation of recommendations made in 2008 by the Organ Donation Taskforce. By 2012, the donation rate in the UK was 17.4 pmp. Donation rates in Wales continued to be higher than in the other countries of the UK. In 2012, the rate in Wales was 24.9 pmp.

Detailed cost-benefit analyses were published by the Welsh Government in 2012 as part of their Regulatory Impact Assessment. Net savings forecast, over a ten-year period, were: £3.392m per additional kidney transplant; £5.624m per additional liver transplant; £2.434m per additional heart transplant; £0.65m per additional lung transplant. The figures were calculated using transplant related costs against savings of medical management, to which quality-adjusted life year benefits (calculated by the UK Department of Health in 2006) were added. More people are on the waiting list for organ donation than organs are available. In Wales, 33 people died in 2012/13 while waiting for an organ. In September 2012, 237 people in Wales were on the waiting list for an organ. In 2011/12, 67 people became organ donors in Welsh hospitals. Potentially, each donor could provide up to nine organs for transplant. The Welsh Government hope organ donation rates will increase by 25 per cent following the introduction of a soft opt-out system.

According to those in favour of presumed-consent, an opt-out system increases the number of organs available for transplant. However, according to those in favour of an opt-in system, no evidence exists to show an increase following such a change to the organ donation system.

== Organ Donation Taskforce ==
In 2006, the UK Government set up the Organ Donation Taskforce (ODTF), to "consider the barriers to organ donation and make recommendations on how they could be overcome". The ODTF was asked: to take stock of progress within the context of the UK's ten year transplant framework (published in 2003); to identify barriers to organ donation; and to recommend what action needed to be taken to increase organ donation and procurement. The ODTF's first report, 'Organs for Transplants', published in January 2008, made 14 recommendations for improvements to donation infrastructure, including better identification and improved referral and care of donors, by which they anticipated a 50 per cent increase in organ donation in the UK within five years. No recommendations were made on the system of consent.

Following their report, the UK Health Minister asked the ODTF to extend their work, to consider whether presumed consent should be introduced throughout the UK. The ODTF's second report, published in November 2008, unanimously opposed a change in the law to a system of presumed consent.

== Considering legislation ==
Kidney Wales Foundation petitioned the National Assembly for Wales, in 2007, to increase the number of organ donors in Wales. The Assembly's Petitions Committee invited Kidney Wales Foundation to present oral evidence and, subsequently referred the matter to the Assembly's Health, Wellbeing and Local Government Committee, requesting that they consider the issue of presumed consent. The Committee presented its report, Inquiry into Presumed Consent for Organ Donation, in July 2008. The report was critical of UK Transplant (UKT). Noting that substantial sums were provided to UKT by the Welsh Government, the committee put forward three recommendations to ensure the needs of Wales were met. These included requiring UKT to comply with the Welsh Language Act 1993; the report noted that UKT had made no provision for Welsh speakers and the only Welsh language literature produced by UKT was the organ donor card. No suggestion was made, however, "that organs harvested in Wales should not continue to be made available across the UK". A number of recommendations were made in the report, including implementing the UK "ODTF recommendations in full in Wales as a matter of urgency". Although most of the Committee agreed with presumed consent in principle, their report did not recommend that the Assembly should seek to introduce of a system of presumed consent "at this stage". Of the nine committee members, six voted against proposing a presumed consent system: Jonathan Morgan (chair) (Conservative (Con)); Lorraine Barrett (Labour (Lab)); Irene James (Lab); Ann Jones (Lab); Val Lloyd (Lab); and Nick Ramsay (Con). Three voted in its favour; Helen Mary Jones (Plaid Cymru (PC)); Dr Dai Lloyd (PC); and Jenny Randerson (Liberal Democrat). In September 2008, Edwina Hart, Minister for Health and Social Care, rejected the committee's main recommendation, saying it did not reflect the weight of public opinion in favour of presumed consent. Hart confirmed the Welsh Government's intention to keep a change to the law under "active consideration".

Nationwide public debates, held between October 2008 and January 2009, sought to gauge public opinion on whether Wales should become the first UK country to introduce an opt-out system. The Welsh Government's public consultation paper, Options for Changes to the Organ Donation System in Wales published in May 2009, concluded that public opinion favoured change to a soft opt-out system. Further public consultation in 2009 showed "strong public support" for legislative change, encouraging Hart to propose introducing a presumed consent organ donation system in Wales.

== Legislative progress ==
The Welsh Government announced their intention, in December 2009, to submit a Legislative Competence Order (LCO) introducing a soft opt-out system of presumed consent organ donation in Wales. This was confirmed by Carwyn Jones, First Minister of Wales, when he set out the Government's 2010/11 legislative programme. An LCO proposing to transfer legislative powers for organ donation from the UK Parliament in Westminster to the National Assembly was introduced by the Welsh Government on 10 January 2011, as The National Assembly for Wales (Legislative Competence) (Health and Health Services) Order 2011).

In a referendum on 3 March 2011, Wales voted in favour of extending the law-making powers of its National Assembly. This allowed primary law to be made in the Senedd, freeing the Assembly from the requirement to seek permission from Westminster for an LCO before it could enact legislation on devolved matters. Consequently, on 9 March 2013, Edwina Hart, Minister for Health and Social Services, withdrew the LCO from consideration by the Secretary of State for Wales and the Welsh Affairs Committee in London. An impending Assembly election required that the Assembly be dissolved before the 5 May 2011 polling day. Believing insufficient time remained to write and consider a new bill before the Assembly's dissolution, Hart urged the next government to pursue new primary legislation permitting the system of presumed consent organ donation that she favoured.

Three of the four main parties (Plaid Cymru, Welsh Labour and Welsh Liberal Democrats) included a commitment to introduce an opt-out system for organ donation in their 2011 election manifestos. Following the election, which returned Labour as the largest party, Carwyn Jones included an "Organ Donation Bill to create an opt-out system of organ donation" among the legislative priorities set out by the new Welsh Government in July 2011. In the First Minister's Legislative Programme statement, Jones told the Assembly the government would introduce a bill by the end of 2011, "with a view to a new soft opt-out system being implemented in 2015".

=== White paper ===
A white paper proposing introducing a soft opt-out system of organ donation in Wales was published by the Welsh Government in November 2011. Its aim was to increase the number of organs available for donation, explaining that under the prevailing opt-in system, suitable organs were often not used because the deceased had not signed the NHS organ donor register (ODR). It said only 31 per cent of people in Wales were included on the ODR. It cited 25 to 30 per cent higher organ donation rates in countries using a soft opt-out system. The white paper proposed permitting the removal of organs and tissue for transplant of adults who had lived and died in Wales, unless they had objected during their lifetime. Under the proposals, the deceased's relatives would be involved in any decision to remove organs. The white paper invited responses to its proposals. Over the 12 week consultation period, 1,234 responses were received, which the Welsh Government published in March and April 2012. The public consultation included 13 meetings held across Wales. Of the responses stating a view, 52 per cent were in favour of the proposals, and 39 per cent against. A BBC Cymru Wales/ICM poll (of 1,000 people) held in March 2012 showed 63 per cent were in favour of the proposals, and 31 per cent against.

=== Draft bill ===
Further consultation was sought on the Welsh Government's Draft Human Transplantation (Wales) Bill and Explanatory Memorandum, published in June 2012. The 12 week consultation elicited 2,977 responses, a summary of which was published in October 2012 (updated December 2012). Of the 2,977 responses, 2,688 were identical or similar letters from (whom Dr Chris Jones NHS Wales medical director described as) "lobbying organisations" concerning the definition of brain-stem death, which would not change under the proposals.

=== Stage one ===
The Human Transplantation (Wales) Bill was laid before the National Assembly for Wales on 4 December 2012, by Lesley Griffiths, Minister for Health and Social Services. The bill's purpose was to establish a soft opt-out system, applying to people aged 18 and over who had lived in Wales for more than six months. Griffiths emphasised medical staff would not add to the families' distress by insisting on taking organs from their deceased relatives, despite families having no legal right of veto. The Welsh Government also published further research giving evidence of "an association" between opt-out laws and increased rates of organ donation, of 13–18 per cent. Noting that research showed that knowing the deceased's wishes were the main determining factor of their family's decision to agree to organ donation, Griffiths announced the Heart to heart campaign, aiming to encourage families to ensure their wishes for organ donation were known to each other.

Mark Drakeford, Minister for Health and Social Services since March 2013, moved the motion to agree the General Principles of the Human Transplantation (Wales) Bill in the Assembly on 16 April 2013. Addressing the "serious concerns" raised by the Health and Social Care Committee about the role of the deceased's family in the decision to donate organs, Drakeford said the Bill would be amended to provide a "clear right of objection for family members, where they can confirm that a potential donor would not have wished donation to take place". The Motion was agreed: For 41; Against 9; Abstain 5.

=== Stage two ===
The Health and Social Care Committee considered amendments to the bill on 22 May 2013. Of the 42 amendments considered, 22 were agreed, including extending the period of residency in Wales for deemed consent to apply, from six to twelve months. The living donation criteria for those "lacking the capacity to consent to donation" was confirmed to apply only if donation were in the best interests of the potential donor.

=== Stage three ===
Amendments to the bill, as agreed in committee, were debated and disposed of in the Senedd, on 2 July 2013.

=== Stage four ===
The bill was passed by the National Assembly on 2 July 2013, following discussion in the Senedd of four and three quarter hours.

=== Royal assent ===
The bill was given royal assent on 10 September 2013, becoming the Human Transplantation (Wales) Act 2013.

== Exemptions ==
Over 70 amendments to the bill were discussed before the bill was passed, several of which were agreed. Other transplants, including of limbs and face, would be exempt from the final regulations, which at the time of the bill, had yet to be completed.
