= Active mobility =

Unmotorised transport powered by activity

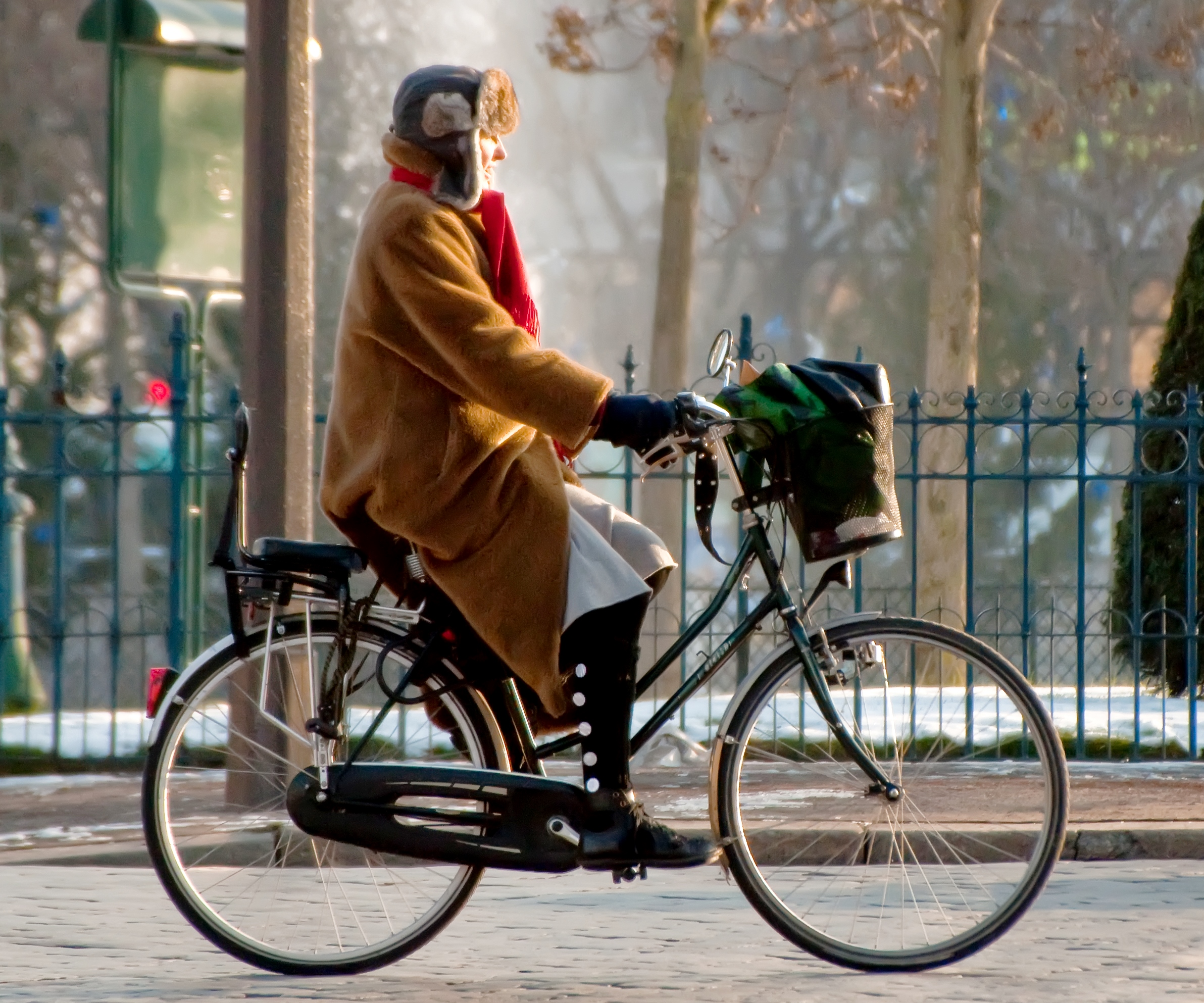
The urban bicycle, one of the most widespread and well-known vehicles for active mobility

Active mobility, soft mobility, active travel, active transport or active transportation is the transport of people or goods, through non-motorized means, based around human physical activity. The best-known forms of active mobility are walking and cycling, though other modes include running, rowing, skateboarding, kick scooters and roller skates. Due to its prevalence, cycling is sometimes considered separately from the other forms of active mobility.

Public policies promoting active mobility tend to improve health indicators by increasing the levels of physical fitness and reducing the rates of obesity and diabetes, whilst also reducing the consumption of fossil fuels and consequent carbon emissions. These policies are proven to result in large increases in active transportation for commuting: for example Portland, Oregon, was able to increase bicycle use 5-fold from 1990 to 2009 with pro-cycling programs. Studies have shown that city level programs are more effective than encouraging active mobility on the individual level.

== Health ==
Health benefits of active mobility include alleviating urban pressures, reduced energy consumption and production, and improved quality of life. Commonly active transport prevents the chances of fatal disease caused by pollution and environmental issues. Active mobility improves health by decreasing air pollution from cars. However, negative health problems can arise from inactive and sedentary lifestyles. The US Centers for Disease Control recommends increasing access to active transportation. Multiple U.S. studies advocate for increased access to active transportation for everyone, including children, due to multiple health benefits.

Sedentary people can lower their BMI by increasing physical activity. A House of Commons of the United Kingdom Health Committee report about Obesity in 2004 recommended cycling and walking as key components to combat obesity. Public Health England estimated in 2016 that in the UK, physical inactivity directly contributes to one in six deaths every year. The PHE report notes that walking and cycling daily is effective to increase physical activity and reduce levels of obesity, as well as prevent cardiovascular disease, type 2 diabetes, cancer and several mental illnesses, including depression.

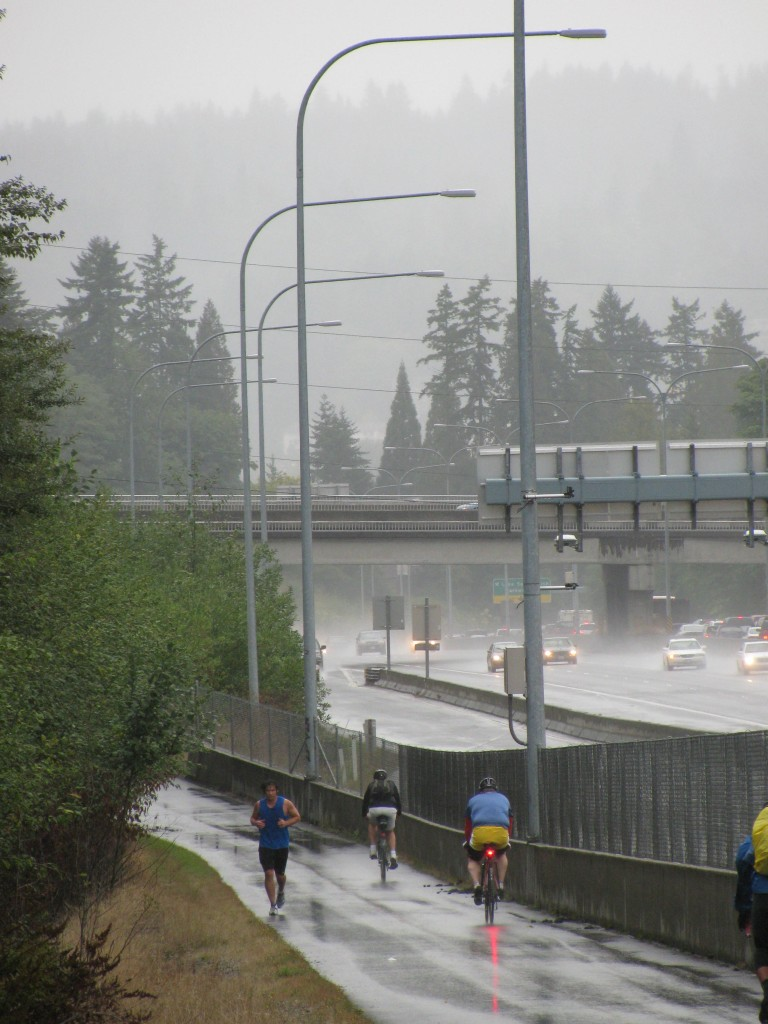
People exercising with active mobility on a rainy day

Physical exercise improves mental and physical health. Cyclists and walkers perceive their environment differently than people driving in cars because cars block sensory inputs that active mobility exposes. Proponents of active mobility assert that activities like cycling and walking promote a feeling of community and connection, improving mental health and overall wellbeing.

Providing good infrastructure for active mobility effectively promotes this type of transportation to decrease traffic and urban congestion. Cycling and walking can save money by reducing money spent on gasoline. Consequences of cycling and walking include increased exposure to air pollution, noise, and more frequent accidents. Cycling reduces the need for large roads and parking lots as bikes occupy 8% of available space compared to cars. As cycling and walking increase, urban infrastructure can be transformed to parks to add green space to urban environments. Aesthetically pleasing areas can become optimal places for walking and cycling in cities. Urban environments can also be transformed into walkable areas, which can benefit the elderly, but safety can be problematic if areas are congested with cars. Designing safe walkable areas in cities can increase the popularity of walking, decrease physical inactivity, and improve health.

Additionally, electric bike users benefit from this type of physical activity. In seven European cities, electric bike users had 10% higher weekly energy expenditure than other cyclists. People switching to e-bike from either private cars or public transport expend more energy as physical activity increases, gaining between 550 and 880 Metabolic Equivalent Task minutes per week. Electric bikes may act as a cycling enabler for women.

== Environment ==
An environmental benefit of active mobility is reducing greenhouse gas emissions to slow global warming. Every year, a typical car emits 4.6 metric tons of carbon dioxide. As a greenhouse gas, carbon dioxide in the atmosphere speeds up the effects of climate change. As automobile use increases greenhouse gas emissions, the rates in which our Earth is reaching climate tipping point thresholds are escalating. Active mobility lowers daily greenhouse gas emissions, slowing these tipping points. For example, in New Zealand, active mobility has been found to reduce emissions of carbon dioxide by 1% annually. In a study of 7 European cities, it was found that individual changes in active travel come with significant lifecycle carbon emissions benefits, even in European urban contexts with already high walking and cycling shares. An increase in cycling or walking consistently and independently decreased mobility-related lifecycle CO_{2} emissions. An average person cycling 1 trip/day more and driving 1 trip/day less for 200 days a year would decrease mobility-related lifecycle CO_{2} emissions by about 0.5 tonnes over a year.

Air and noise pollution are negative effects of vehicular transport. Air pollution negatively affects human health and the environment. Air pollution can cause acid rain, eutrophication, haze, wildlife deaths, thinning of Earth's ozone layer, crop damage, and global climate change. Noise pollution disrupts ecosystems and wildlife. Active mobility reduces air and noise pollution by substituting for cars that produce greenhouse gases and noise, benefiting the environment and urban ecosystems.

== Economy ==
Active mobility, such as walking and cycling, provides significant economic benefits, particularly in terms of economic equity. Compared to car ownership, which requires substantial upfront and ongoing costs for fuel, maintenance, and insurance, active transport options are highly affordable. Investing in active mobility infrastructure improves access to jobs, education, and essential services for lower-income households, reducing transportation poverty and promoting more equitable economic opportunities within urban spaces.

== Government responses ==
Road sign in Victoria, Australia

Active mobility has appealed to policymakers because of its beneficial contributions to physical health and reductions of air pollution, leading to legislative efforts to make cycling and walking safer and more attractive for commuting and personal errands. These measures include infrastructure changes to accommodate more cyclists and pedestrians on roads, regulations to limit car traffic, and education and training to improve the coordination between motor vehicles and individuals using active mobility. Infrastructure developments that have been correlated with increased active mobility are wider sidewalks, street lighting, flat terrain, and urban greenery, particularly with access to parks. Cycling in particular requires more infrastructure development to achieve a noticeable increase in use, including:

- Bike lanes: a separate lane on a conventional road designated by signage and street markings to be reserved for bicycles.
- Bike boxes: areas at an intersection designated for bicycles to occupy when stopped.
- Bicycle stations: specialized parking facilities that also include basic tools for bicycle maintenance.

Several researchers have also emphasized that the largest contribution to active mobility comes from easy access to local amenities such as restaurants, shops, and theaters, which can be promoted by local governments. A significant concern about increased active mobility is a corresponding increase in injuries and deaths, especially between pedestrians or cyclists and motor vehicles. Active mobility may often be more time-consuming than commuting by vehicle, and the effects of distance, geographic features such as hills, and climate may make outdoor exertion uncomfortable or impractical. Another criticism of active transportation policy contends that converting traffic lanes for bicycle use makes travel more difficult for commuters who must use a motor vehicle. Historically, modern urban planning has heavily prioritized motorized transport, resulting in street space allocation that disproportionately favors cars over active mobility. This car-centric design approach was often driven by the automotive industry's influence on infrastructure and city planning, leading to urban environments where pedestrians and cyclists are marginalized. Reversing this trend requires a fairer allocation of street space based on ethical principles, prioritizing the safety, accessibility, and convenience of active transport users.

== By country ==
=== European Union ===
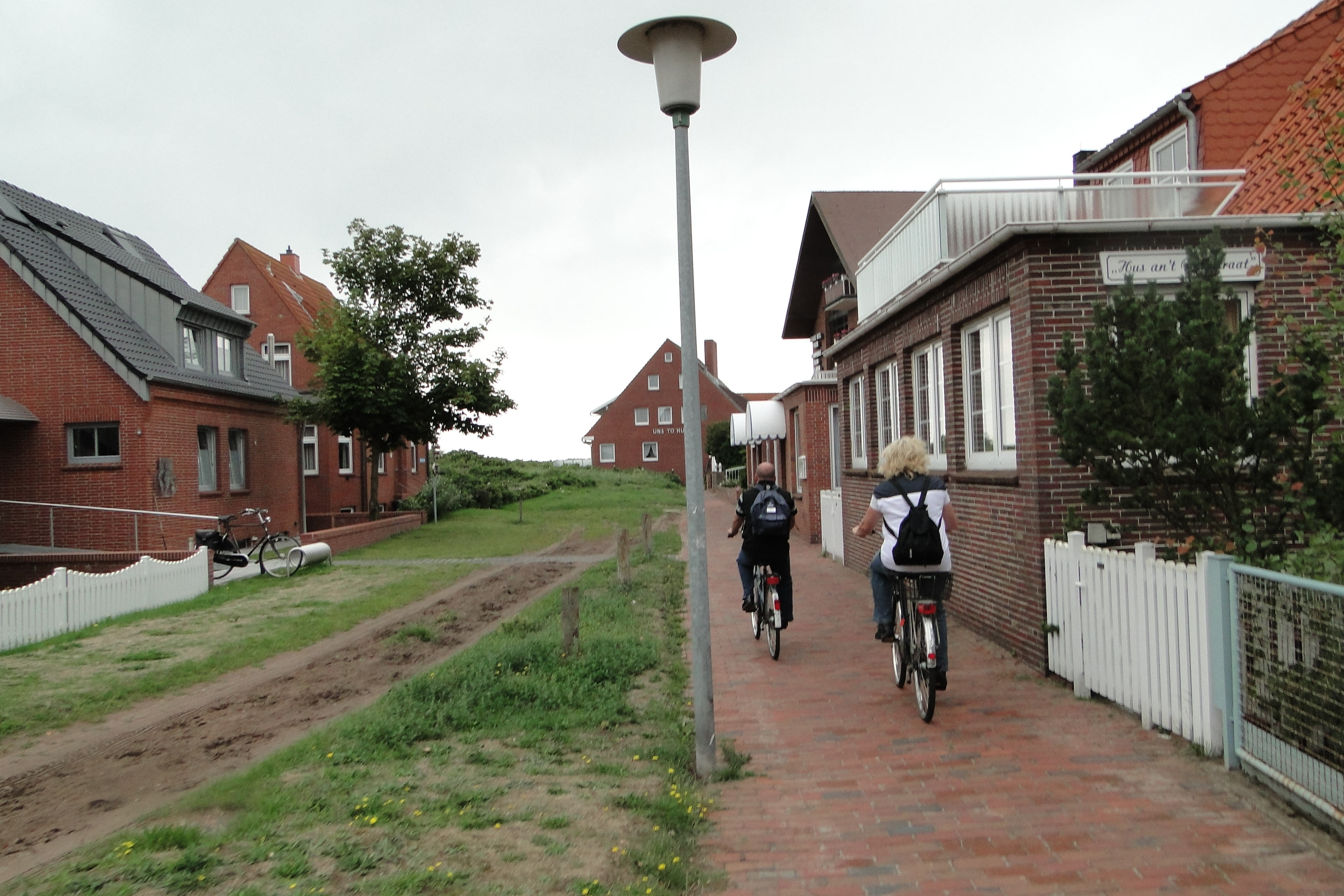
Carfree Juist, Germany

The European Union's Mobility and Transport organization includes the promotion of walking and cycling among its strategies to enable more sustainable transportation in Europe. The European Union has also adopted a Vision Zero goal to eliminate all traffic deaths, seeking to mitigate the number of incidents between pedestrians and cyclists and motor vehicles, as these commonly result in serious injury or death. Separate from the European Union, several European cities and regions founded an organization, Polis, in 1989 to coordinate efforts between local governments and the European Union to improve the efficiency of transportation. This includes the facilitation of active mobility, which Polis states provides benefits to the environment and to the public's physical health and asserts that these improvements contribute to the economy as well. Polis recommends that policy decisions should account for benefits from reduced health and environmental costs from active mobility, increased city accessibility from reduced congestion and pollution, and consider regulations on vehicle design to address concerns of safety and convenience. Polis encourages the development of Sustainable Urban Mobility Plans (SUMPs) to guide mobility projects in cities of all sizes.

=== Netherlands ===
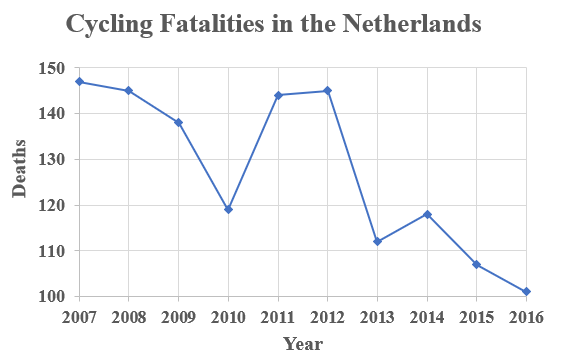
Cycling fatalities in the Netherlands from 2007 to 2016.

Active mobility is used widely in the Netherlands, comprising more than 40% of commuting in urban areas. The flat topography and temperate climate of the Netherlands benefit active mobility, which has been supported by government policy for decades, including 35,000 kilometers of dedicated cycling paths. As a result, the Dutch government estimates that there are about 1.3 bikes per person in the Netherlands. A consequence of this is that about 20% of Dutch road accident fatalities are cyclists, with more than 100 cyclists perishing each year. This rate and number are higher than most other European countries, reflecting the high use of active mobility in the Netherlands. However, policy efforts by the Ministry of Industry and Water Management may have contributed to a declining mortality rate, which fell more than 30% from 2007 to 2016.

=== Singapore ===
The Land Transport Authority (LTA) of Singapore pursues a stated goal to supplement mechanized transportation methods with "walk and cycle options". Following a test plan implemented in the neighborhood of Tampines, the Minister of Transport presented a National Cycling Plan in 2013 to provide paths to integrate cycling with Singapore's extensive Mass Rapid Transit system. This includes 190 kilometers of paths, thousands of bicycle parking racks, signage, and cyclist education. These efforts have been criticized, however, as being limited in scope, especially for limiting the expansion of cycling access to off-road connections, such as through the Park Connectors Network, rather than more infrastructure for commuting in cities.

=== United Kingdom ===
The Association of Directors of Public Health in the United Kingdom, joined by over one hundred signatory organizations including Sustrans and the Royal College of Physicians on a position paper on active travel, set out a number of clear policy measures recommended for local planning and highway authorities, including:

- A 20 mph (32 km/h) speed limit for residential areas.
- Cycling road infrastructure that provides for convenient and practical transportation.
- Education of drivers and revamped law enforcement to improve road safety.
- Publishing clear goals for the expansion of active transportation.

==== England ====
The UK Government's plan for active travel in England was released in 2020 and is known as Gear Change. The plan aims to make England a 'great cycling nation'. The plan aims to create cycling and walking corridors, introduce more low-traffic neighbourhoods and school streets, aims to set high standards for cycling infrastructure. The plan accompanies £2 billion in additional funding over the following five years for cycling and walking announced in May 2020. The plan also introduced a new body and inspectorate known as Active Travel England.

==== Scotland ====
Scottish Government policy aims to increase the use of active travel modes in Scotland for shorter journeys and to make active mobility safer and inclusive. The National Walking Strategy was published in 2017 and the Cycling Action Plan for Scotland (CAPS) was last updated in 2017.

The active travel advocacy group Cycling UK criticised the Scottish Government for not increasing funding for active travel. The Scottish budget allocates £100 million for cycling and walking, which is 3.3% of the transport budget or the total cost of three miles of the A9 dualling scheme. Within the public sector in Scotland the transport sector has the lowest percentage of women in senior posts. Only 6.25% of heads of transport bodies are women.

==== Wales ====
Other steps include the Active Travel (Wales) Act 2013, which passed in 2013. The act requires local authorities to continuously improve facilities and routes for pedestrians and cyclists and to prepare maps identifying current and potential future routes for their use. It also requires road improvement and development projects to consider the needs of pedestrians and cyclists at the design stage.

=== United States ===
Residents of the United States use active mobility as a mode of transportation less often than residents of other countries. The far greater mortality rates of pedestrians and cyclists in U.S. cities has been cited as a contributing factor to this trend. Efforts to increase use of active mobility have been undertaken at the federal levels by the U.S. Department of Transportation, which pursues the development of active commuting through its Livability Initiative. The Livability Initiative includes billions of dollars of funding through several grant programs, including the Better Utilizing Investments to Leverage Development (BUILD), Infrastructure for Rebuilding America (INFRA), and the Transportation Infrastructure Finance and Innovation Act (TIFIA), to facilitate the construction of infrastructure supportive of increased pedestrian and bicycle traffic. Funding increases for these programs, such as the Fixing America's Surface Transportation (FAST) act of 2015, have garnered bipartisan support. Multiple cities in the United States, including Seattle, Chicago, Minneapolis, Sacramento, and Houston, have implemented their own policies to encourage the active mobility for commuting to work and to school. More extensive efforts involve detailed active transportation programs (ATPs), such as those implemented in California, Portland, Oregon, Fort Worth, Texas, and San Diego County. However, these efforts have struggled to promote measurable changes in the percentage of commuters using active transportation to work: in the United States Census Bureau's American Community Survey, 3.4% of Americans biked or walked to work in 2013, and only 3.1% did so in 2018.

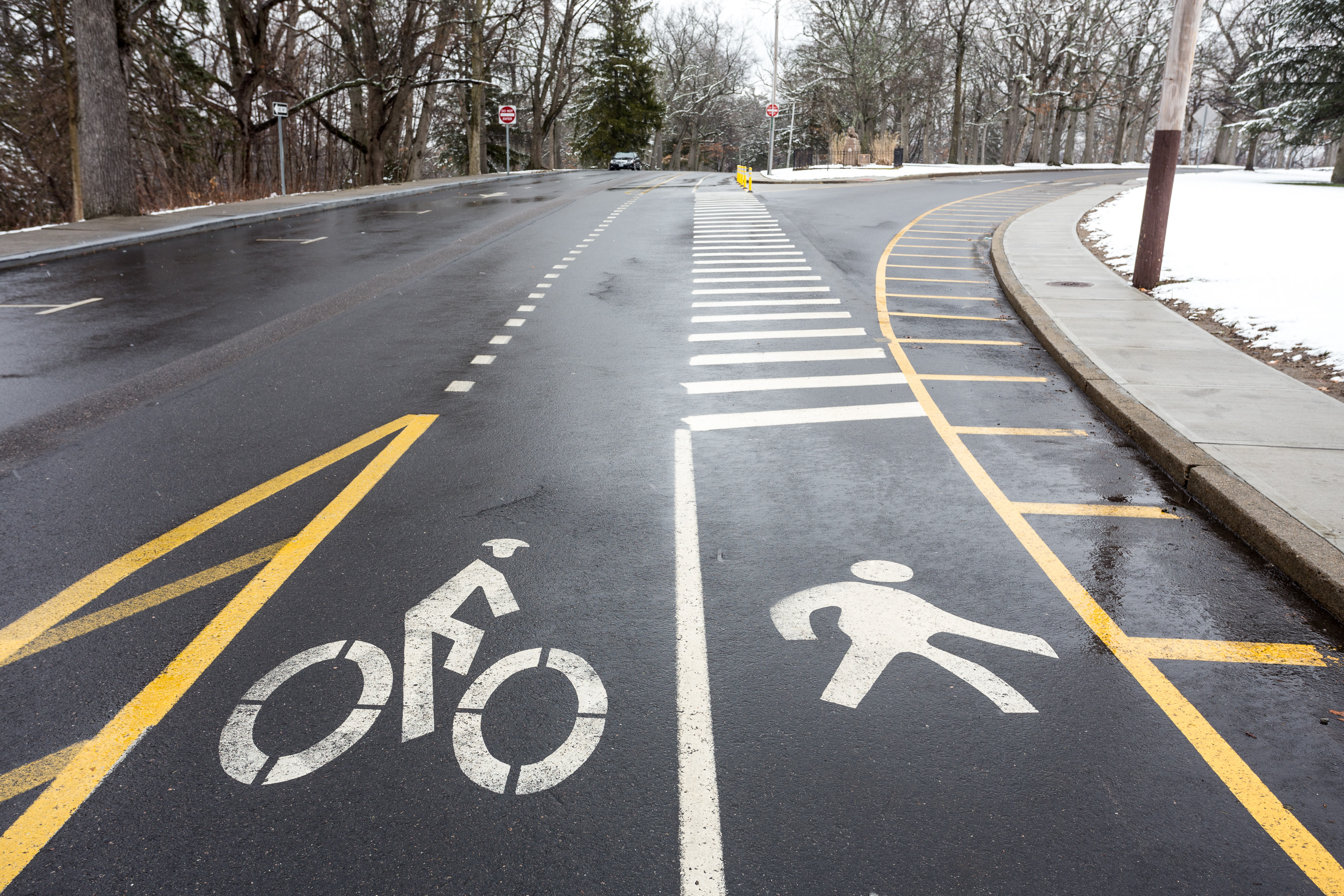
Bike and pedestrian lanes in Roger Williams Park.

Active Commuting in the United States
Year	Biking	Walking	Total Active Commuting
2013	0.614%	2.792%	3.405%
2014	0.631%	2.754%	3.385%
2015	0.595%	2.768%	3.362%
2016	0.573%	2.706%	3.279%
2017	0.556%	2.639%	3.195%
2018	0.526%	2.574%	3.100%

== Disabled people ==
People with disabilities often face more issues with active transport than those without disabilities.

Some people have medical barriers to active travel. There are some instances where it is not possible for a person to walk or cycle, and, even if the physical, societal and financial barriers were removed, some would still need access to a motor vehicle.

An immediate barrier for disabled people walking on roads is the inaccessibility of streetspace, for example:

- Clutter on footpaths, e.g. road signs and electric vehicle charging points
- Uneven or steep footpaths
- A lack of dropped kerbs and tactile paving
- A lack of places for people to stop to rest
- Hazards caused by shared space with vehicles

For those who wish to cycle, barriers can include narrow cycle lanes, infrastructure that requires a cyclist to dismount, physical access barriers and a lack of suitable cycle parking facilities.

== Gender differences ==
In some cities and countries women lead the way when it comes to walking. 54% of journeys completed wholly on foot in London are made by women.

According to research into gender differences in active travel across a range of international cities, women are more likely than men to walk and more likely to use public transport. The gender differences in active travel metrics are age dependent. Women's and men's perceptions of danger and safety lead to different travel experiences. Research highlights the importance of a gendered approach towards healthy living and active transport policy making with considerations for reducing road traffic danger and male violence.

Men are more likely to have access to private cars than women. Design that benefits cars over other modes of transport disproportionately benefits men. Men and women tend to have different patterns of journeys. Women are more likely to be trip chaining, and trip chaining encourages car use. Women are also more likely to be 'encumbered' by carrying children, shopping or accompanied by elderly companions In the UK fewer women cycle than men and road safety is cited as a concern relating to cycling and to walking. A Sustrans report in the UK found a lack of evidence that women participate in creating transport policy and planning.

== See also ==
- Automobile dependency
- Bicycle-friendly – Urban planning prioritising cycling
- Cyclability
- Carfree city – Urban area absent of motor vehicles
- Health impact of light rail systems
- Human-powered transport
- Motor vehicle
- Outline of cycling
- Pedestrian village – Urban planning for mixed-use areas prioritising pedestrians
- Street reclamation – Changing streets to focus on non-car use
- Urban vitality
