= Breathtaking (book) =

2021 book by Rachel Clarke

Breathtaking: Inside the NHS in a Time of Pandemic
- Author: Rachel Clarke
- Subject: COVID-19 pandemic in the United Kingdom
- Set in: NHS
- Published: 2021
- Publisher: Little, Brown and Company
- Publication place: United Kingdom
- Pages: 228
- ISBN: 978-1-4087-1378-5
- Preceded by: Your Life in My Hands (2017); Dear Life, a doctor's story of love and loss (2020)

Breathtaking: Inside the NHS in a Time of Pandemic is a 2021 memoir by British physician Rachel Clarke, published by Little, Brown and Company. It is based on the NHS during the first four months of 2020, leading up to and including the early months of the COVID-19 pandemic in the United Kingdom. The book was adapted by Clarke, Jed Mercurio, and Prasanna Puwanarajah, to produce a TV series of the same name, first broadcast in 2024.

The book was preceded by Your Life in My Hands (2017) and Dear Life (2020).
