= Magic string (therapeutic aid) =

Magic string is a psychological therapeutic aid used to make radiotherapy treatment for children less stressful. Without its use, many children need to have general anaesthetic in order to receive their treatment.

== Background ==
Patients receiving radiotherapy have to be alone inside a lead-lined room, since only they can be exposed to the radiation, and also have to stay still during the treatment, with the necessary immobility being achieved through the use of a radiotherapy mask that covers the face and shoulders and is fastened to the treatment bed. Adult patients often find this claustrophobic and it can be particularly distressing for young children. Consequently, many young patients have required sedation with a general anaesthetic in order to meet the requirements of their radiotherapy.

== Implementation ==
The use of magic string, simply a multi-coloured ball of twine, was learned about in 2007 by Lobke Marsden, a play specialist at the Bexley Wing oncology unit of St James's University Hospital in Leeds, as a low-cost solution to the problem of children's difficulties with radiotherapy. One end of the string is held by the patient and the other end by the parent. In 2017, Marsden told Ellen Wallwork of The Huffington Post,

"String is perfect for children that really need that connection with their parents. They often give it a little tug, and the parents tug it back from the other room to let the child know they are right there with them", adding that, "It has proven to be the cheapest and one of the best pieces of 'equipment' we own".

Writing in The Guardian in June 2018, Rachel Clarke said, "Cheap as chips and priceless, magic string was created not for profit or personal gain – but simply because someone cared".
