= Human Tissue Authority =

Body of the UK Department of Health and Social Care

Non-departmental public body overview
- Formed: 1 April 2005
- Parent department: Department of Health and Social Care
- Website: www.hta.gov.uk

The Human Tissue Authority (HTA) is an executive non-departmental public body of the Department of Health and Social Care in the United Kingdom. It regulates the removal, storage, use and disposal of human bodies, organs and tissue for a number of scheduled purposes such as research, transplantation, and education and training.

It was created by the Human Tissue Act 2004 and came into being on 1 April 2005 and its statutory functions began on 1 April 2006.

The HTA's aim is to build on the trust people have in the sector by ensuring that human tissue and organs are used safely and ethically, and with proper consent.

It also acts as the UK competent authority under the EU Tissue and Cells Directives and the EU Organ Donation Directive.

The remit of the HTA is set out in section 14 of the Human Tissue Act 2004. It issues a series of Codes of Practice and Standards for people working with human tissue and cells. And it issues licences and inspects organisations that remove, store and use human tissue to uphold those Standards.

It operates across 6 areas:

1. Anatomy: Use of bodies for anatomical examination, teaching, and training.
2. Post Mortem: Post-mortem examinations, tissue retention, and disposal.
3. Public Display: Display of human bodies and tissue.
4. Organ Donation and Transplantation: Organ and tissue donation, retrieval, and transplantation.
5. Research: Use of human tissue in research.
6. Human Application: Use of human tissues and cells for medical treatment.

== Legislation ==
The Human Tissue Act 2004 established the HTA to regulate activities concerning the removal, storage, use and disposal of human tissue in England and Wales and Northern Ireland.

The 2004 Act repeals and replaces the Human Tissue Act 1961, the Anatomy Act 1984 and the Human Organ Transplants Act 1989 as they relate to England and Wales, and the corresponding Orders in Northern Ireland.

There is separate legislation in Scotland: the Human Tissue (Scotland) Act 2006. The HTA performs certain tasks on behalf of the Scottish Government (approval of living donation and licensing of establishments storing tissue for human application).

The 2004 Act makes consent the fundamental principle underpinning the lawful storage and use of body parts, organs and tissue from the living or the deceased for specified health-related purposes and public display. It also covers the removal of such material from the deceased. It lists the purposes for which consent is required (the scheduled purposes). Whereas consent must usually be explicit, the Act was amended to allow deemed consent (or 'opt out') for deceased organ donation in certain circumstances and subject to conditions set out in the Organ Donation (Deemed Consent) Act 2019 (England), Human Transplantation (Wales) Act 2013, and Organ and Tissue Donation (Deemed Consent) Act (Northern Ireland) 2022. In Scotland a system of deemed authorisation was set out in the Human Tissue (Authorisation) (Scotland) Act 2019.

== Composition ==
The Board (known as 'the Authority') consists of a chair and members appointed by the Secretary of State for Health, as well as one member appointed by the Welsh Government, and one appointed by the Department of Health, Social Services and Public Safety in Northern Ireland.

The professional members of the board come from medical and scientific backgrounds, and the lay members bring a wide range of business, commercial and public sector experience.

The Board was originally chaired by Baroness Hayman followed, in 2006, by Shirley Harrison; from January 2010 to 2018 by Baroness Diana Warwick; from March 2018 to January 2019 by Baroness Nicola Blackwood; and since November 2019 by Lynne Berry CBE.
