= Story of a Heart =

Story of a Heart may refer to:

- Story of a Heart (album)
- "Story of a Heart" (song)
- The Story of a Heart: Two Families, One Heart, and a Medical Miracle, a 2024 non-fiction book
