= Organ Donation Taskforce =

UK Government taskforce

In December 2006, The UK Government set up the Organ Donation Taskforce to identify barriers to organ donation and recommend actions needed to increase organ donation and procurement within the current legal framework.

The Taskforce was asked to:

- take stock of progress within the context of the UK's ten year transplant framework (published in 2003)
- to identify barriers to organ donation
- to recommend what action needs to be taken to increase organ donation and procurement within the current legal framework.

== Membership ==
The ODTF comprised medical professionals, National Health Service managers, patients and patient representatives and ethicists and is chaired by Elisabeth Buggins.

== First Taskforce Report ==
The ODTF published its first report "Organs for Transplants" on 16 January 2008.

In the report, the Taskforce makes 14 recommendations to the Government, which could see a 50 per cent increase in organ donation in the UK within five years – resulting in an additional 1,200 transplants a year and saving thousands of lives. The report proposes a radical shift from existing arrangements for the UK's transplantation system. Together with other measures to improve donor coordination services this could result in a 10% increase in the consent rate for donation (currently at 60%).

== Second Taskforce Report ==
At the time of launch of the First taskforce report, the UK Prime Minister called for a review of the legislation over consent for organ donation.

The ODTF carried out an investigation and published its second report "The potential impact of an opt out system for organ donation in the UK" on 17 November 2008

This report provided an in-depth examination of the potential impact of changing to an opt out system of consent for organ donation. It concluded that an opt out system should not be implemented in the UK at the current time.

The Taskforce concluded that there was no convincing evidence that a change to opt out consent would deliver significant increases in the number of donated organs. It felt that such a system has the potential to undermine the concept of donation as a gift, to erode trust in NHS professionals and the Government and negatively impact on organ donation numbers. It concluded a change in consent system would be costly to implement.

It also felt that an opt out consent system would distract attention away from the need to improve the systems and infrastructure around organ donation in the UK and the need to improve awareness and understanding of organ donation.

In putting together the report, the Taskforce had discussions and engagement with academics, health professionals, members of the public, organ recipients, families of donors and faith leaders. The report details the considerable volume of evidence the ODTF considered before coming to its conclusions.

== Presumed consent – the current legislative position ==
Under Part 1 of the Human Tissue Act 2004, it is unlawful to remove, store, or use human organs and other tissue for scheduled purposes without appropriate consent. The removal, storage and use of an organ for the purpose of transplantation are scheduled purposes in this context.

Appropriate consent is defined within the Act as:

a. If a decision of a deceased person to consent to the activity, or a decision of his not to consent to it, was in force immediately before he had died, his consent.

b. Where such a decision is not in force, then consent is required from either a nominated representative, or, a person in a qualifying relationship (such as next of kin).

The Human Tissue Act 2004 covers England, Wales and Northern Ireland. The Human Tissue (Scotland) Act 2006 covers Scotland and has broadly similar provisions as far as transplantation is concerned.

== Background to the Taskforce's work ==
Transplants currently enable about 2,700 people to pursue an active life in the UK every year. Transplants are the best possible treatment for most people with organ failure.

Kidney transplants are the most common organ transplant performed in the UK. Transplants of the heart, liver and lungs are also regularly carried out. As medicine advances, other vital organs including the pancreas and small bowel are also being used in transplants. Tissue such as corneas, heart valves, skin and bone can also be donated.

The increasing effectiveness of transplantation means that many more patients can be considered for treatment in this way but there is a serious shortage of donors. Around 8,000 people in the UK are currently awaiting a transplant. For some people this means waiting, sometime for years, and undergoing difficult and stressful treatment. Many will die before a suitable organ becomes available.

== Facts ==
- Currently, between 7000 and 8,000 people in the UK need a transplant, currently rising by about 8% a year.
- Over the last five years, UK Department of Health funding – £4.16million in 2006/07 – has supported a number of initiatives to increase donor rates.
- Living donor and non-heartbeating donor rates have risen significantly in recent years. However, the rate of donation by heartbeating (death established through brain stem testing) donors (the main source of donor organs) has remained steady at best.
- Over 14 million people – some 24% of the population – have now registered on the UK Organ Donor Register.
- In the UK between 1 April 2006 and 31 March 2007:

3,086 organ transplants were carried out, thanks to the generosity of 1,495 donors. 949 lives were saved in the UK through a heart, lung, liver or combined heart/lungs, liver/kidney, liver/pancreas or heart/kidney transplant.

- A total of 2,137 patients received a kidney, pancreas or combined kidney/pancreas transplant.
- A further 2,402 people had their sight restored through a cornea transplant.
- A record number of non-heartbeating donor kidney transplants took place and accounted for one in seven of all kidney transplants.
- The highest number of combined kidney/pancreas transplants took place (164, representing a 53% increase on 2005–2006).
- Living donor kidney transplants are increasing – 461 in 2003–2004, 475 in 2004–2005, 589 in 2005–2006, and 690 in 2006–2007, and now represent more than one in four of all kidney transplants.
- At the end of March 2007, 7,234 patients were listed as actively waiting for a transplant.
