= Elizabeth Ward (British campaigner) =

Charity founder and organ donor card pioneer (1926–2020)

Elizabeth Ward MBE
- Ward on This Is Your Life, 1997
- Born: Elizabeth Despard Rynd; 11 October 1926; Hampstead, London, England
- Died: 20 July 2020 (aged 93)
- Education: Cheltenham Ladies' College
- Organisation: Kidney Care UK (formerly British Kidney Patient Association)
- Known for: Healthcare campaigning
- Notable work: Timbo: A Struggle for Survival
- Spouse: Nigel Ward (m. 1952; died 2007)
- Children: 3, including Timbo Ward

Elizabeth Despard Ward MBE (née Rynd; formerly Aston; 11 October 1926 – 20 July 2020) was a British healthcare campaigner known for pioneering organ donor cards and founding the charity Kidney Care UK.

After gaining fundraising experience working for The Guide Dogs for the Blind Association, Ward started raising money for Kidney Research UK in 1971 when her son Timothy started receiving dialysis treatment. She gained press attention for the cause of kidney patients by placing a personal advertisement in The Times seeking a transplant kidney for her son. Ward then struck up a correspondence with the then Secretary of State for Health, whose son went to school with Timothy. This led to her involvement in the Government's Kidney Donor Scheme, which introduced donor cards with posters designed by Ward.

In 1974, Ward recognised the need for a patient-focused organisation to add to the work of Kidney Research UK. She worked with her friend Robert Platt, former president of the Royal College of Physicians, to launch the British Kidney Patient Association, which was later renamed Kidney Care UK. Ward was noted for her "don't ask, don't get" approach to fundraising. Using this method, she raised £70 million for hospital renal units, and ensured kidney patients were the focus of television programme Blue Peter's Christmas 1982 appeal.

Described as "redoubtable and fiery", Ward also had a "near fanatical zeal" in advocating for patients in the face of sexism, prejudice, and the traditional power balance within the medical establishment. Upon realising that donor cards alone were not enough to eliminate the shortage of kidneys available for transplant, she also advocated for the UK's introduction of opt-out consent for organ donation. She argued for this approach throughout the nineties and into the 2000s, with the Organ Donation (Deemed Consent) Act passing in May 2020, shortly before her death.

== Charity and fundraising ==
Ward's son Timothy, whom she called Timbo, suffered kidney failure in 1970. He started receiving treatment with a dialysis machine, which performs the kidney's functions of filtering the blood, removing toxins, and reabsorbing water to make urine for those whose kidneys cannot do so naturally. At that time, it was estimated that over 7,000 people were dying annually from kidney disease. Kidney transplant surgery had been carried out since 1960, but was still in its infancy and not widely available.

A medical recommendation of a high protein diet incorporating foods like steak and cream led Ward to consider the financial challenges that many families with a sick child would face. This led her to start fundraising for Guy's Hospital, London, and St Mary's Hospital, Portsmouth in 1971. Recognising the need for credibility, she persuaded the director of the National Kidney Research Fund, now Kidney Research UK, to allow her to use their headed notepaper.

By 1974, Ward realised there was a need to add to the work being done by the National Kidney Research Fund. She noted that there was not an organisation focused on the welfare of kidney patients themselves. With input from her friend Robert Platt, former president of the Royal College of Physicians, she developed a plan for a charity called the British Kidney Patient Association, which would launch the next year. In 2017, it was relaunched as Kidney Care UK.

David Prosser, Vice Chair of Kidney Research UK, recounted a 1980s conversation with Ward in which she explained her fundraising approach: "Don't ask, don't get". This took the form of browbeating, sometimes bullying (in Ward's own words), and indomitable persistence.

After daily phone calls over a period of three years, Ward was able to convince Biddy Baxter, producer of the children's television programme Blue Peter, to dedicate its 1982 Christmas appeal to raising money for young people suffering kidney failure. Ward wrote that this raised £2.5 million. It also led to 8 million "treasure parcels" being sent from children in the UK to provide equipment for over 20 hospitals.

It was reported that in total Ward's work raised £70 million, which was put towards funding renal units at hospitals in London (at Great Ormond Street Hospital), Birmingham, Crawley and Glasgow.

== Donor card ==
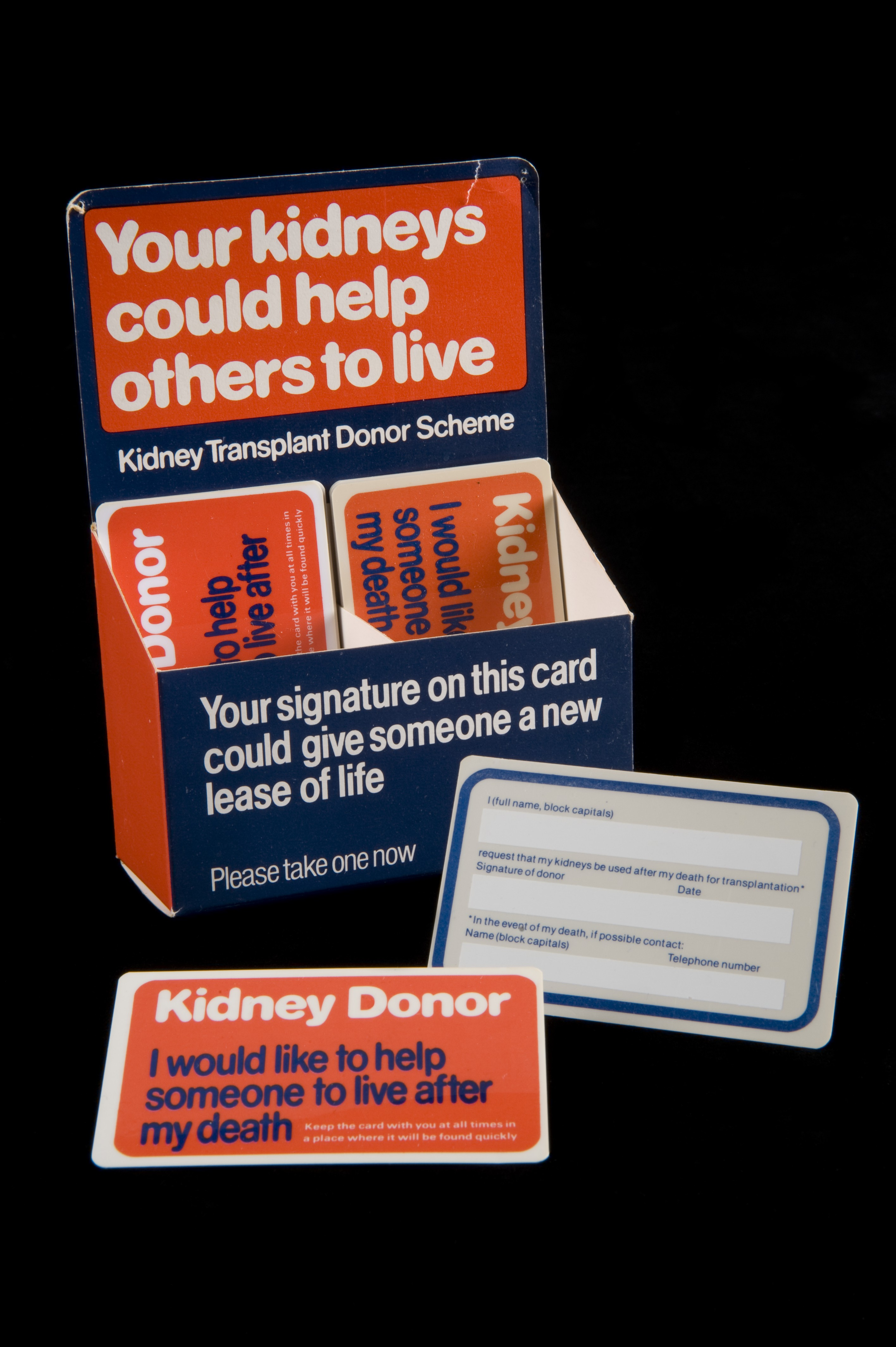
The design of the first donor card, introduced in 1971.

In the summer of 1971, Ward placed an advertisement in the personal column of The Times looking for a donor kidney for Timbo. In Ward's book, Timbo: A Struggle for Survival, she explains that her true intention here was to gain press attention for the cause of kidney patients. The advertisement read "A donated cadaver kidney of [his] tissue type will release an eighteen year old from the wretchedness of his [dialysis] machine". The next day their story was published in the Daily Mirror, Daily Express, and Daily Mail.

Ward also began writing to the then Secretary of State for Health, Sir Keith Joseph. She shared with him an example of an American kidney donor card she had received from a US-based friend and asked that he consider introducing similar in the UK. His reply was that "We do not feel the climate is right to introduce the donor card at this stage".

Ward followed up by explaining that Timbo had attended Harrow School with Joseph's son James and asked him to consider how he would feel if their roles were reversed. She admitted that this was, in her words, "hitting below the belt". Two or three weeks later, she was invited to a meeting with senior civil servants at the Department of Health and Social Security to discuss what became the Government's Kidney Donor Scheme.

Ahead of the meeting, Ward worked with a friend at a London advertising agency to produce a mock-up of a poster promoting the scheme she had in mind. It read "Harry Morgan left a fob-watch to his son, an insurance policy to his wife, and something very special to two perfect strangers". She learned at the meeting that it had already been agreed behind the scenes that the production of donor cards would go ahead. When conversation turned to promoting the scheme, and who would cover the cost of printing and distributing posts, she was asked by a civil servant "Right, but who's paying for all of this anyway?". She responded, "You are, of course. Surely this is your kidney donor scheme?". The cards were then introduced; in Ward's words they were "slipped onto a disinterested public reluctant market with no fanfare of trumpets".

== Opt-out consent ==
Ward said that she had believed that "once everybody knew there were 1,200 patients on dialysis waiting for their chance to lead a proper life that everybody would carry a [donor] card". This turned out not to be the case: in 1991 Ward wrote in The BMJ that only 7% of the UK population carried them. Doctors were also reluctant to discuss the matter of donation with deceased patients' recently bereaved family members. Discussions with patients, doctors and ethicists on this topic led Ward to conclude that an opt-out system was the only possible solution to the shortage of donor organs. Under such a system, people would be assumed to be willing donors after their death unless they opted out by adding their name to a register of dissent.

She compared the legal debate on the topic to the introduction of seatbelt legislation in Britain. This had the full support of medical professionals, which Ward said meant it passed through Parliament with ease despite objections on the grounds that the law would restrict the freedom of the individual. She wrote that "there will be a continuing waste of life" until the same support is given to opt-out legislation.

Ward claimed that an opt-out system would save millions of pounds for the NHS: a kidney transplant costs half as much as a year of dialysis, and such a system would enable the 5,000 people awaiting the availability of kidneys for transplant to be matched with a suitable donor organ much sooner.

She continued to argue for this approach throughout the nineties and into the 2000s. In 2008, her views were cited in multiple Parliamentary debates on the topic by Evan Harris.

The Organ Donation (Deemed Consent) Act was enacted in May 2020. Former Chair of Kidney Care UK Sally Taber later said how pleased she was that the law was passed in Ward's lifetime, and that to celebrate Ward "popped a bottle of fizz".

== Patient advocacy ==
Ward initially faced challenges in getting treatment for Timbo; she wrote of some doctors' "egotistical, self-satisfied traits" that were "the cause of much patient unhappiness in the renal world". In the early 70s, according to The BMJ, the traditional power balance in medicine between doctor and patient had only recently been challenged. She faced sexism in her attempts to be involved in Timbo's care and, as a layperson, was seen as interfering.

She later wrote of receiving hundreds of letters from patients and their families disappointed at their treatment, or lack of it, saying she "never hesitated to take up cudgels on behalf of these people and attempt to sort out each individual problem". The Times described her as "redoubtable and fiery", and "a scourge to what she considered to be snobbishness and prejudice in the medical establishment". The BMJ described Ward's support of vulnerable patients as having a "near fanatical zeal". This extended to making threats: of "eternal damnation" for an order of nuns who would not fund the dialysis treatment of a homeless man, and of going to the press for a hospital that would not install a dialysis machine.

She was reunited with one such patient when she appeared on the BBC's This Is Your Life in 1997. The last guest on the programme was a woman who, years before at the age of 6, had received dialysis and a kidney transplant when Ward acted for her. The woman had previously been refused a transplant due to personal judgements of her family by a medical consultant.

== Personal life ==
Ward married her husband Nigel, whom she met playing tennis, in 1952. The two of them founded a meat-canning business where she worked as sales director, which her BMJ obituary linked to her fundraising prowess – "in essence, a massive selling operation". Timbo Ward's third kidney transplant was with an organ donated by Nigel, his father.

In the 1978 New Year Honours, Ward was appointed a Member of the Order of the British Empire for her work with the British Kidney Patient Association.

Prior to her work on nephrology-related issues, Ward had campaigned for The Guide Dogs for the Blind Association.
