= Criticism of the National Health Service (England) =

The logo of the NHS for England.

Criticism of the National Health Service (England) includes issues such as access, waiting lists, healthcare coverage, and various scandals. The National Health Service (NHS) is the publicly funded health care system of England, created under the National Health Service Act 1946 by the post-war Labour government of Clement Attlee. It has come under much criticism, especially during the early 2000s, due to outbreaks of antibiotic resistant infections such as MRSA and Clostridioides difficile infection, waiting lists, and medical scandals such as the Alder Hey organs scandal. However, the involvement of the NHS in scandals extends back many years, including over the provision of mental health care in the 1970s and 1980s (ultimately part of the reason for the Mental Health Act 1983), and overspends on hospital newbuilds, including Guy's Hospital Phase III in London in 1985, the cost of which shot up from £29 million to £152 million.

== Access controls and waiting lists ==
In making health care a largely "invisible cost" to the patient, healthcare seems to be effectively free to its consumers - there is no specific NHS tax or levy. To reduce costs and ensure that everyone is treated equitably, there are a variety of "gatekeepers." The general practitioner (GP) functions as a primary gatekeeper - without a referral from a GP, it is often impossible to gain higher courses of treatment, such as an appointment with a consultant. These are argued to be necessary - Welshman Bevan noted in a 1948 speech in the House of Commons, "we shall never have all we need... expectations will always exceed capacity". On the other hand, the national health insurance systems in other countries (e.g. Germany) have dispensed with the need for referral; direct access to a specialist is possible there.

There has been concern about opportunistic "health tourists" travelling to Britain (mostly London) and using the NHS while paying nothing. British citizens have been known to travel to other European countries to take advantage of lower costs, and because of a fear of hospital-acquired super bugs and long waiting lists.

NHS access is therefore controlled by medical priority rather than price mechanism, leading to waiting lists for both consultations and surgery, up to months long, although the Labour government of 1997-onwards made it one of its key targets to reduce waiting lists. In 1997, the waiting time for a non-urgent operation could be two years; there were ambitions to reduce it to 18 weeks despite opposition from doctors. It is contested that this system is fairer - if a medical complaint is acute and life-threatening, a patient will reach the front of the queue quickly.

The NHS measures medical need in terms of quality-adjusted life years (QALYs), a method of quantifying the benefit of medical intervention. It is argued that this method of allocating healthcare means some patients must lose out in order for others to gain, and that QALY is a crude method of making life and death decisions.

=== Hospital acquired infections ===
There have been several fatal outbreaks of antibiotic resistant bacteria ("super bugs") in NHS hospitals, such as Methicillin-resistant Staphylococcus aureus (MRSA), vancomycin-resistant Enterococcus and Clostridioides difficile infection. This has led to criticism of standards of hygiene across the NHS, with some patients buying private health insurance or travelling abroad to avoid the perceived threat of catching a "super bug" while in hospital. However, the department of health pledged £50 million for a "deep clean" of all NHS England hospitals in 2007.

== Coverage ==
The lack of availability of some treatments due to their perceived poor cost-effectiveness sometimes leads to what some call a "postcode lottery". The National Institute for Health and Care Excellence (NICE) are the first gatekeeper, and examine the cost effectiveness of all drugs. Until they have issued guidance on the cost and effectiveness of new or expensive medicines, treatments and procedures, NHS services are unlikely to offer to fund courses of treatment. The same of true of the Scottish Medicines Consortium, NICE's counterpart in Scotland.

There has been considerable controversy about the public health funding of expensive drugs, notably Herceptin, due to its high cost and perceived limited overall survival. The campaign waged by cancer sufferers to get the government to pay for their treatment has gone to the highest levels in the courts and the Cabinet to get it licensed. The House of Commons Health Select Committee criticised some drug companies for bringing in drugs that cost on and around the £30,000 limit that is considered the maximum worth of one QALY in the NHS.

== Private Finance Initiative ==
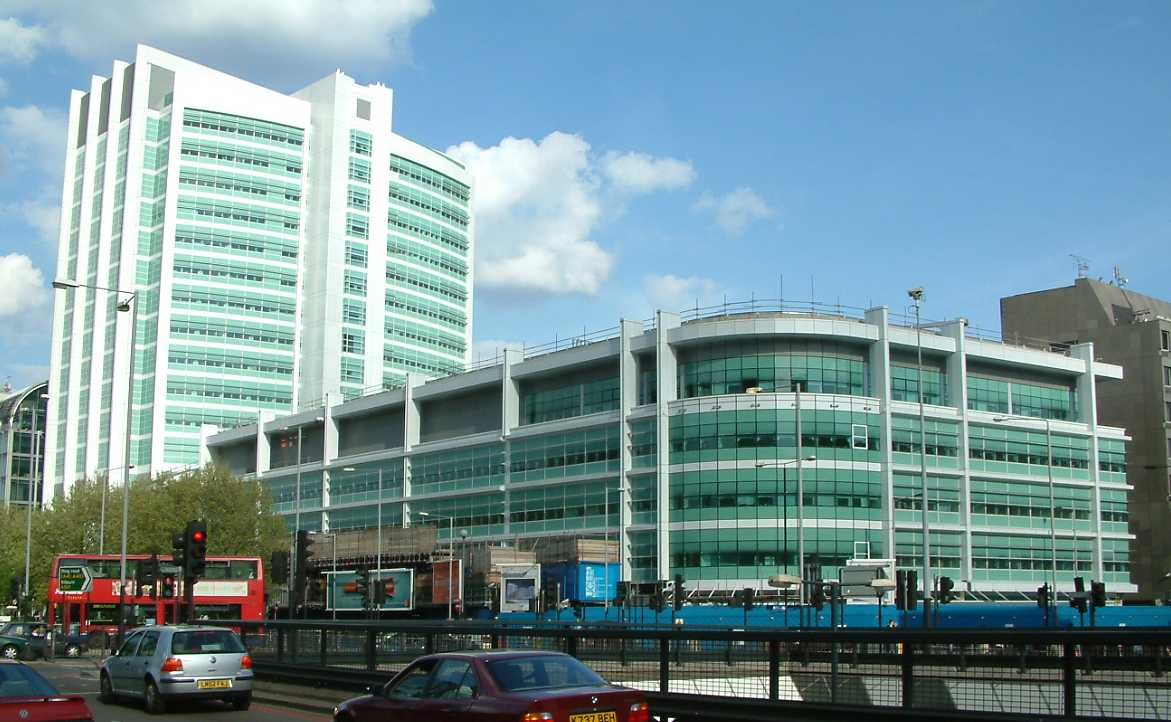
University College Hospital, London

Before the idea of private finance initiative (PFI) came to prominence, all new hospital building was by convention funded from the Treasury, as it was believed it was best able to raise money and able to control public sector expenditure. In June 1994, the Capital Investment Manual (CIM) was published, setting out the terms of PFI contracts. The CIM made it clear that future capital projects (building of new facilities) had to look at whether PFI was preferable to using public sector funding. By the end of 1995, 60 relatively small projects had been planned for, at a total cost of around £2 billion. Under PFI, buildings were built and serviced by the private sector, and then leased back to the NHS. The Labour government elected under Tony Blair in 1997 embraced PFI projects, believing that public spending needed to be curtailed.

Under the private finance initiative, an increasing number of hospitals have been built (or rebuilt) by private sector consortia, although the government also encouraged private sector treatment centres, so called "surgicentres". There has been significant criticism of this, with a study by a consultancy company which works for the Department of Health showing that for every £200 million spent on privately financed hospitals the NHS loses 1000 doctors and nurses. The first PFI hospitals contain some 28% fewer beds than the ones they replaced. As well as this, it has been noted that the return for construction companies on PFI contracts could be as high as 58%, and that in funding hospitals from the private rather than public sector cost the NHS almost half a billion pounds more every year.

== Scandals ==
Several high-profile medical scandals have occurred within the NHS over the years, such as the Alder Hey organs scandal and the Bristol heart scandal. At Alder Hey Children's Hospital, there was the unauthorised removal, retention, and disposal of human tissue, including children's organs, between 1988 and 1995. The official report into the incident, the Redfern Report, revealed that Dick van Velzen, the Chair of Foetal and Infant Pathology at Alder Hey, had ordered the "unethical and illegal stripping of every organ from every child who had had a postmortem." In response, it has been argued that the scandal brought the issue of organ and tissue donation into the public domain, and highlighted the benefits to medical research that result. The Gosport War Memorial Hospital scandal of the 1990s regarded opioid deaths.

The Stafford Hospital scandal in Stafford, England in the late 2000s concerned abnormally high mortality rates amongst patients at the hospital. Up to 1200 more patients died between 2005 and 2008 than would be expected for the type and size of hospital based on figures from a mortality model, but the final Healthcare Commission report concluded it would be misleading to link the inadequate care to a specific number or range of numbers of deaths. A public inquiry later revealed multiple instances of neglect, incompetence and abuse of patients.

== See also ==
- National Health Service
- List of hospitals in England
- Healthcare in the United Kingdom
- Private Finance Initiative
- Care Quality Commission
