= Alder Hey organs scandal =

20th-century human tissue scandal

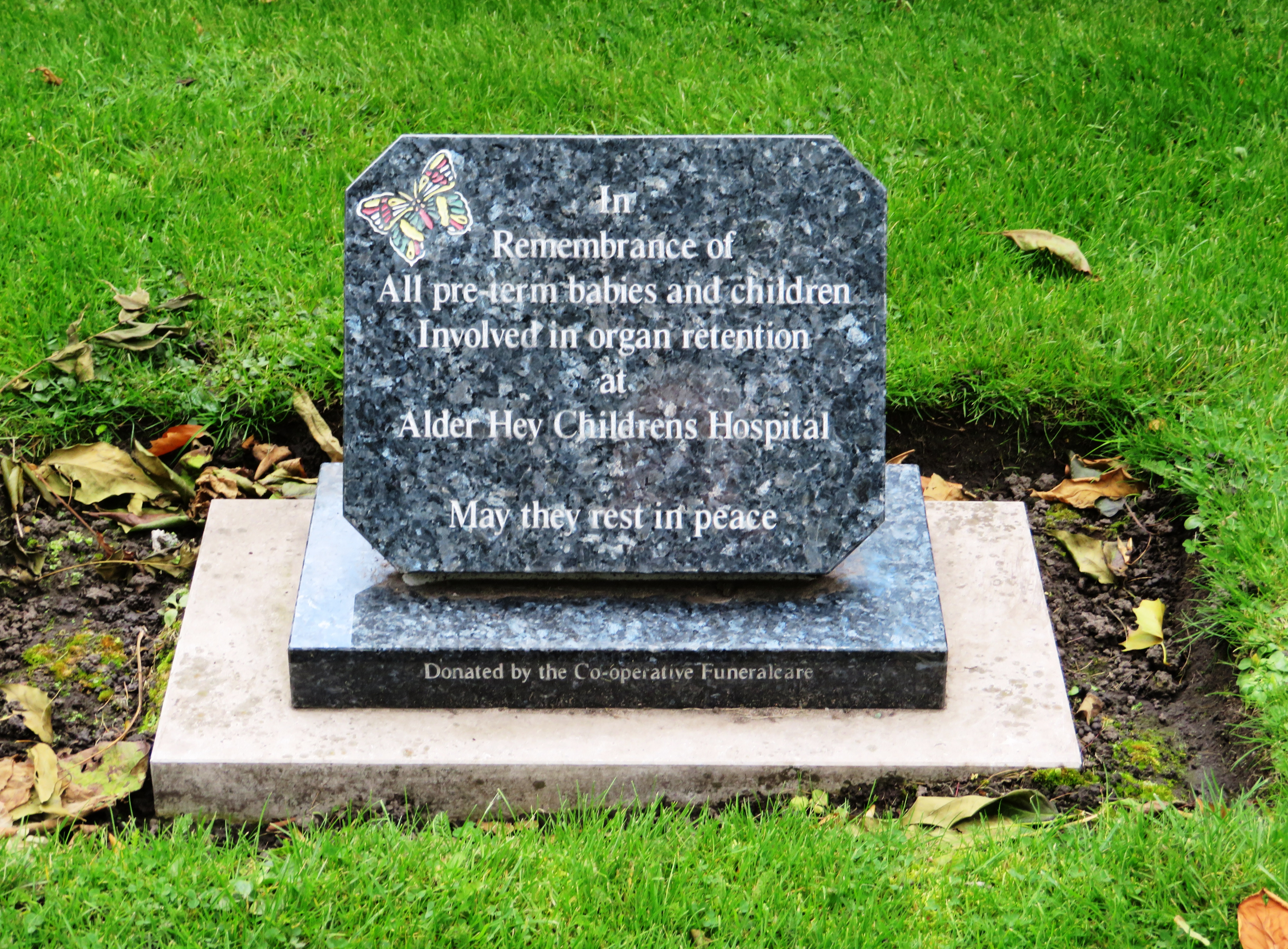
Memorial tablet in central Liverpool

The Alder Hey organs scandal in Liverpool, England, involved the unauthorised removal, retention, and disposal of human tissue, including children's organs, during the period 1981 to 1996. Organs were retained in more than 2,000 pots (Note: "Pot", in the UK, is a term of art for a plastic formalin-filled container, of any of various sizes, which is used to store tissues in a pathology lab.) containing body parts from around 850 infants. These were later uncovered at Alder Hey Children's Hospital, during a public inquiry into the organ retention scandal.

In 2002, compensation was paid to over 1,000 parents. The scandal led to the Human Tissue Act 2004, which overhauled legislation regarding the handling of human tissues in the UK and created the Human Tissue Authority.

== History ==
Until a public inquiry in 1999, the general public was unaware that Alder Hey and other hospitals within the National Health Service (NHS) were retaining patients' organs without family consent.

The inquiry was sparked by the death in 1992 of 11-month-old Samantha Rickard while undergoing open-heart surgery at Bristol Royal Infirmary. In 1996, her mother Helen Rickard learned of the allegations of excessive mortality rates for children's heart surgery at that hospital. Rickard demanded a copy of her infant daughter's medical records and found a letter from the pathologist who performed the post-mortem to her surgeon, stating that he had retained Samantha's heart. Confronted with this evidence, the hospital promptly returned the heart in 1997. Rickard quit her job in order to find out exactly what had happened to her daughter; she set up a support group with other parents and ran a free phone helpline to cater to the many other families affected as well.

A Bristol Heart Children Action Group was set up, and the group embarked on discussions with the hospital to find out how much human material had been kept from children who had died after cardiac surgery. In February 1999, the Action Group members called a press conference so that the public could learn about the retained hearts. In the meantime, serious doubts about the quality of paediatric cardiac surgery at Bristol led to the formation of a public inquiry, chaired by Ian Kennedy, into what became known as the Bristol heart scandal. In September 1999, a medical witness to the inquiry drew attention to the large number of hearts held at the Alder Hey Children's Hospital in Liverpool.

As the details of Alder Hey's organ retention began to come to light, the public learned that the programme went back decades. An investigation was opened in December 1999 and found that Alder Hey was not the only Liverpool hospital affected; Walton Hospital had stored the organs of 700 patients.

In January 2001, the official Alder Hey report (also known as the Redfern Report) was published. A public outcry against the National Health Service resulted when it was revealed that Dutch pathologist Dick van Velzen had systematically ordered the "unethical and illegal stripping of every organ from every child who had had a postmortem" during his time at the hospital. This was ordered even for the children of parents who specifically stated that they did not want a full post-mortem. The report also revealed that over 100,000 organs, body parts and entire bodies of foetuses and still-born babies were stored in 210 NHS facilities. Additionally, 480,600 samples of tissue taken from dead patients were being held. Later that year, the General Medical Council (GMC) ruled that van Velzen should be temporarily banned from practising medicine in the UK.

Furthermore, it emerged that Birmingham Children's Hospital and Alder Hey Children's Hospital had also given thymus glands, removed from live children during heart surgery, to a pharmaceutical company for research in return for financial donations. Alder Hey also stored without consent 1,500 foetuses that were miscarried, stillborn or aborted.

Early 2003 saw an out-of-court settlement of claims by a group of more than 1,000 Alder Hey parents. Compensation of £5 million was paid, equivalent to about £5,000 for each child.

In January 2004, more than 2,000 families filed suit against the NHS with the High Court for removing the body parts of dead patients, including children, without consent.

Starting on 5 August 2004, the bodies of 50 nameless babies stored for medical research at Liverpool hospitals were buried at Allerton Cemetery. Alder Hey accounted for seven of them, while the rest came from other hospitals. More funerals followed on the Thursday of each week for several months. Over 1,000 unidentified bodies, most of them foetuses less than 28 weeks old, were buried during this time. Further interments of unclaimed samples, organs and foetuses took place at the cemetery between May 2009 and January 2010.

In December 2004, all charges against van Velzen were dropped, because doing so would have required proof of which organs belonged to specific children. On Monday 20 June 2005, the GMC ruled that van Velzen would be permanently banned from practising medicine in the UK.

== Redfern Report primary findings ==
=== Primary conclusions of the Redfern report ===
- Professor Dick van Velzen ordered unethical and illegal retention of all children's organs when he took up post in 1988 and falsified records and postmortem reports. He failed to catalogue organs and took away medical records when he left
- Alder Hey and Liverpool University knew there were risks in appointing Professor Van Velzen but failed to supervise him
- They failed to monitor his work or follow up complaints and missed numerous chances to discipline him. Close scrutiny of his work would have revealed unethical organ retention, but it never happened

=== Recommendations of Redfern report and chief medical officer ===
- Independent commission to oversee cataloguing and return of 105,000 organs retained by hospitals in England
- New legislation on informed consent – the Human Tissue Act 2004
- Review of coroner's system
- Trusts to employ bereavement counsellor
- Review by the education secretary of arrangements for joint hospital/university posts

== Alder Hey scandal timeline ==
April 1988 – Section committee at Alder Hey appoints Dick van Velzen as chair of fetal and infant pathology.

September 1988 – Dick van Velzen assumes his post as chair at Alder Hey.

1992 – Samantha Rickard dies while undergoing open-heart surgery at the Bristol Royal Infirmary.

December 1994 – Dick van Velzen is restricted to fetal and perinatal work only. On hearing this he takes an unauthorized leave from Alder Hey.

February 1995 – Dick van Velzen is ordered to stop any research project without proper ethical approval.

December 1995 – Dick van Velzen leaves Alder Hey and begins work at IWK Grace Hospital in Halifax, Nova Scotia.

1996 – Helen Rickard demands a copy of her medical records from the BRI and finds a letter stating Samantha's heart had been retained.

1998 – Van Velzen is fired from Halifax's IWK Hospital.

February 1999 – The Action Group members call a press conference to inform the public about the retained hearts at BRI.

September 1999 – A medical witness at the BRI inquiry draws attention to the large number of hearts held at the Alder Hey Children's Hospital in Liverpool.

December 1999 – An investigation is opened resulting in the Redfern report.

September 2000 – A worker at a storage facility in Halifax finds the organs of an 8-year-old girl in a plastic bag.

2001 – GMC rules that Dutch pathologist Dick van Velzen should be temporarily banned from practising medicine in the UK.

30 January 2001 – Redfern report released.

4 February 2001 – Prosecutors in Halifax indicate that they are prepared to ask for the extradition of Prof Dick van Velzen relating to the discovery of children's organs in heat-sealed bags at a rented warehouse.

July 2001 – Van Velzen is convicted of improperly storing body parts removed from a child in the Halifax case. He was given 12 months of probation and ordered to pay CA$2,000 to charity.

Early 2003 – Alder Hey claims settled with families of the victims for an out-of-court settlement of £5 million.

January 2004 – Over 2,000 families file suit against the NHS with the High Court for removing the body parts of dead patients without consent.

5 August 2004 – Start of unidentified body burials at Allerton cemetery.

5 December 2004 – The Crown Prosecution Service decides there should be no prosecution of Prof Dick Van Velzen for criminal offences.

20 June 2005 – General Medical Council rules that Dutch pathologist Dick van Velzen should be banned from practising medicine permanently in the UK.
