= Your Life in My Hands =

2017 book by Rachel Clarke

- Author: Rachel Clarke
- Set in: NHS
- Publisher: Metro Books
- Publication date: 2017
- Publication place: United Kingdom
- ISBN: 978-1-78946-365-1
- Followed by: Dear Life (2020); Breathtaking (2021)

Your Life in My Hands: A Junior Doctor's Story is a 2017 memoir by British physician Rachel Clarke, published by Metro Books. It gives an account of her experiences as a newly qualified doctor in the UK. It was followed by Dear Life (2020) and Breathtaking (2021).
