= Human Tissue (Authorisation) (Scotland) Act 2019 =

Act of the Scottish Parliament

- Act of the Scottish Parliament
- Scottish Parliament
- Long title: An Act of the Scottish Parliament to make provision about authorisation of the removal and use of part of the body of a deceased person for transplantation and other purposes; and for connected purposes.
- Citation: 2019 asp 11
- Introduced by: Shona Robison MSP, Cabinet Secretary for Health and Sport
- Territorial extent: Scotland

Dates
- Royal assent: 18 July 2019

Other legislation
- Amends: Human Tissue (Scotland) Act 2006

Status: Current legislation

History of passage through the Parliament

Text of statute as originally enacted

Text of the Human Tissue (Authorisation) (Scotland) Act 2019 as in force today (including any amendments) within the United Kingdom, from legislation.gov.uk.

The Human Tissue (Authorisation) (Scotland) Act 2019 (asp 11) is an act of the Scottish Parliament. The act changed the law regarding organ donation so that unless someone expressly opted out, they would be deemed as having given consent.

== History ==
In June 2017, the Scottish Government announced its intentions to bring forward legislation for an opt-out system for organ donation. In 2018, the Scottish Government announced published the bill. In February 2019, the Scottish Parliament debated presumed consent for organ donation.

In 2021, the act was commenced – this had been delayed due to the Coronavirus pandemic.

== Provisions ==
The act has several exceptions for eligibility that mirror the Organ Donation (Deemed Consent) Act 2019.

the Scottish model places less weight on the role of those in qualifying relationships and more on the principle of deemed consent than the Organ Donation (Deemed Consent) Act.

== Reception ==
The lack of public awareness around the register for registering objections to opt-out of organ donation makes the safeguards less effective. Unlike England, there is no app-based system for registering medical an objection.

The act has been criticised for potentially reducing the rate of donation by giving too much weight to qualifying relationships.

== Examples ==
During September 2021, a young father revealed he was able to be present for the birth of his child, because of a heart that had been donated on the basis of deemed authorisation.

== See also ==
- Healthcare in the United Kingdom
