= Dear Life (Clarke book) =

2020 book by Rachel Clarke

Dear Life, a doctor's story of love and loss
- Author: Rachel Clarke
- Set in: NHS
- Publisher: Little, Brown and Company
- Publication date: 2020
- Publication place: United Kingdom
- Preceded by: Your Life in My Hands (2017)
- Followed by: Breathtaking (2021)

Dear Life, a doctor's story of love and loss is a 2020 memoir by British physician Rachel Clarke, published by Little, Brown and Company. It succeeded Clarke's first book Your Life in My Hands (2017) and was followed by her third memoir Breathtaking (2021).
