= Breathtaking =

British Television series

- Genre: Medical drama
- Based on: Breathtaking by Rachel Clarke
- Written by: Rachel Clarke; Jed Mercurio; Prasanna Puwanarajah
- Directed by: Craig Viveiros
- Starring: Joanne Froggatt
- Country of origin: United Kingdom
- Original language: English
- No. of series: 1
- No. of episodes: 3

Production
- Executive producers: Rachel Clarke; Jed Mercurio; Prasanna Puwanarajah
- Producer: Brian J. Falconer
- Cinematography: John Pardue
- Editors: Sam White; Josh Mallalieu; Chris White
- Production companies: HTM Television; ITV Studios

Original release
- Network: ITVX
- Release: 19 February – 21 February 2024

Breathtaking is a British medical drama television series, written by Rachel Clarke, Jed Mercurio, and Prasanna Puwanarajah, based on Clarke's 2021 memoir of the same name on the start of the COVID-19 pandemic. It stars Joanne Froggatt and was directed by Craig Viveiros.

== Synopsis ==
The series is set in a city hospital, and combines news footage from the early months of 2020 with portrayal of acute medical consultant Dr Abbey Henderson (Froggatt) and fellow frontline medical staff trying to save the lives of coronavirus patients, as the virus begins to overwhelm the NHS.

== Cast ==
- Joanne Froggatt as Dr Abbey Henderson
- Bhav Joshi as Dr Ant Vyas
- Donna Banya as Emma Mutamba Irungu
- Joseph Charles as Archie Williams
- Jodie McNee as Nurse Jules Jarman
- Stephanie Street as Dr Joanne Alba
- Thom Petty as Dr Neil Westland
- Naomi Denny as Chantelle Gregory
- Afro Parise as Dr Rossi
- Philip Arditti as Dr Metin Ozkul
- Tamer Doghem as Yussuf Ahmad
- Lucy Montgomery as Clare Boxall
- George Georgiu as Dr Huw Shelby
- Georgia Goodman as Divina Aquino
- Christopher Hatherall as Nick Henderson
- Henry Meredith as Tommy Henderson
- Eleanore-Beatriz Viveiros as Robyn Henderson
- Mark Dexter as Dr Mike Prentiss
- Tammy Heath as Alison Frampton
- Mary Woodvine as Cressida Frost

== Production ==
Rachel Clarke's memoir regarding being on the front line of the COVID-19 pandemic was released in 2021. Mecurio and Puwanarajah helped adapt the book for the screen; all three are qualified doctors. Puwanarajah previously worked with Clarke as a medical professional, and previously worked with Mercurio on television productions. Craig Viveiros is director with HTM Television producing the three-part series along with Northern Ireland Screen. It is produced by Brian J. Falconer and executive produced by Mercurio, Clarke and Puwanarajah with ITV Studios an in-association producer and distributing internationally.

=== Filming ===
Filming took place in Belfast and wrapped in the first half of 2023. Viveiros has reportedly used long, real-time sequences as part of the filming process to allow the audience to become “immersed”.

== Broadcast ==
The series was broadcast in the UK on ITV from 19 February 2024.

== Episodes ==
No.	Title	Directed by	Written by	Original release date	UK viewers (millions)
1	"Containment"	Craig Viveiros	Rachel Clarke, Jed Mercurio and Prasanna Puwanarajah	19 February 2024	5.04
2	"Delay"	Craig Viveiros	Rachel Clarke, Jed Mercurio and Prasanna Puwanarajah	20 February 2024	4.57
3	"Mitigation"	Craig Viveiros	Rachel Clarke, Jed Mercurio and Prasanna Puwanarajah	21 February 2024	4.29

== Reception ==
Sean O'Grady of The Independent gave it four out of five stars. Lucy Mangan of The Guardian awarded the first episode three out of five stars. It was nominated for Limited Series or Single Drama at the Royal Television Society Programme Awards in March 2025.
