= Food Hygiene Rating (Wales) Act 2013 =

Act of Senedd Cymru

- Act of the National Assembly for Wales
- National Assembly for Wales
- Long title: An Act of the National Assembly for Wales to make provision for the production of food hygiene ratings of food business establishments; the display of information about food hygiene ratings; the enforcement of requirements to display information; and for connected purposes.
- Citation: 2013 anaw 2
- Introduced by: Lesley Griffiths AM, Minister for Health and Social Services

Dates
- Royal assent: 4 March 2013

Status: Current legislation

History of passage through the Assembly

Text of statute as originally enacted

Text of the Food Hygiene Rating (Wales) Act 2013 as in force today (including any amendments) within the United Kingdom, from legislation.gov.uk.

The Food Hygiene Rating (Wales) Act 2013 (anaw 2) (Welsh: Deddf Sgorio Hylendid Bwyd (Cymru) 2013) is an act of the National Assembly for Wales to make food hygiene ratings mandatory. Food hygiene ratings are available on the Food Standards Agency website.

== Background ==
The Welsh Government announced the policy in 2012.

== Provisions ==
The act requires businesses selling food to display hygiene ratings in a prominently, and to provide the information verbally if it is requested over the phone.

The ratings are also to be made public through use of a food hygiene sticker.

== Implementation ==
The law initially came into force in November 2013. The legislation was extended to food producers and wholesalers in December 2014.

In November 2015, 60% of food businesses had the highest rating under the act.
