= List of acts of the National Assembly for Wales from 2013 =

This is a list of acts of the National Assembly for Wales passed in 2013. Acts of the National Assembly for Wales are acts of Senedd Cymru enacted by Senedd Cymru (the Welsh Parliament; or simply the Senedd) under its former name of the National Assembly for Wales. It has legislative authority over devolved matters in relation to Wales under the authority of the Government of Wales Act 2006. All legislation passed by the Senedd is bilingual, with the English and Welsh texts being equally authoritative. Acts are cited by calendar year, in the same fashion as acts of Parliament of the United Kingdom. Each act passed in a respective year is numbered consecutively with Arabic numerals, following the prefix "anaw" (or, in Welsh, "dccc").

7 acts of the National Assembly for Wales were passed in 2013.

indicates that an act has been transcribed on Wikisource, indicates that an act is available to view at legislation.gov.uk, and indicates the location of the original act in the National Library of Wales.

== Acts of the National Assembly for Wales ==
Short title	Citation	Royal assent
Long title
School Standards and Organisation (Wales) Act 2013; Deddf Safonau a Threfniadaeth Ysgolion (Cymru) 2013	2013 anaw 1; 2013 dccc 1	4 March 2013
An Act of the National Assembly for Wales to reform the powers of local authorities and the Welsh Ministers to intervene in the conduct of schools maintained by local authorities that are causing concern; to reform the powers of the Welsh Ministers to intervene in the exercise of education functions by local authorities; to provide for school improvement guidance; to reform the statutory arrangements for the organisation of maintained schools; to provide for Welsh in education strategic plans; to make miscellaneous provision in relation to maintained schools; and for connected purposes. Deddf gan Gynulliad Cenedlaethol Cymru i ddiwygio pwerau awdurdodau lleol a Gweinidogion Cymru i ymyrryd ym materion rhedeg ysgolion a gynhelir gan awdurdodau lleol ac sy'n peri pryder; diwygio pwerau Gweinidogion Cymru i ymyrryd ym materion arfer swyddogaethau addysg gan awdurdodau lleol; darparu ar gyfer canllawiau gwella ysgolion; diwygio'r trefniadau statudol ar gyfer trefniadaeth ysgolion a gynhelir; darparu ar gyfer cynlluniau strategol Cymraeg mewn addysg; gwneud darpariaeth amrywiol mewn perthynas ag ysgolion a gynhelir; ac at ddibenion cysylltiedig.
Food Hygiene Rating (Wales) Act 2013; Deddf Sgorio Hylendid Bwyd (Cymru) 2013	2013 anaw 2; 2013 dccc 2	4 March 2013
An Act of the National Assembly for Wales to make provision for the production of food hygiene ratings of food business establishments; the display of information about food hygiene ratings; the enforcement of requirements to display information; and for connected purposes. Deddf gan Gynulliad Cenedlaethol Cymru i wneud darpariaeth ar gyfer llunio sgoriau hylendid bwyd ar gyfer sefydliadau busnes bwyd; arddangos gwybodaeth am sgoriau hylendid bwyd; gorfodi'r gofynion i arddangos gwybodaeth; ac at ddibenion cysylltiedig.
Public Audit (Wales) Act 2013; Deddf Archwilio Cyhoeddus (Cymru) 2013	2013 anaw 3; 2013 dccc 3	29 April 2013
An Act of the National Assembly for Wales to make provision reforming audit arrangements in Wales; continuing the office of Auditor General for Wales and creating a new body to be known as the Wales Audit Office; providing for the Auditor General for Wales to audit local government bodies in Wales; and for connected purposes. Deddf gan Gynulliad Cenedlaethol Cymru i wneud darpariaeth i ddiwygio trefniadau archwilio yng Nghymru; i ragnodi y bydd swydd Archwilydd Cyffredinol Cymru yn parhau, ac i greu corff newydd o'r enw Swyddfa Archwilio Cymru; i ddarparu mai Archwilydd Cyffredinol Cymru fydd yn archwilio cyrff llywodraeth leol yng Nghymru; ac at ddibenion cysylltiedig.
Democracy and Boundary Commission Cymru etc. Act 2013 (Note: Short titles amended from Local Government (Democracy) (Wales) Act 2013 and Deddf Llywodraeth Leol (Democratiaeth) (Cymru) 2013 under section 11 of the Senedd Cymru (Members and Elections) Act 2024.) or the Local Government (Democracy) (Wales) Act 2013; Deddf Comisiwn Democratiaeth a Ffiniau Cymru etc. 2013	2013 anaw 4; 2013 dccc 4	30 July 2013
An Act of the National Assembly for Wales to make provision about the constitution and functions of the Local Democracy and Boundary Commission for Wales; to make various provisions relating to local government; and for connected purposes. Deddf gan Gynulliad Cenedlaethol Cymru i wneud darpariaeth ynghylch cyfansoddiad a swyddogaethau Comisiwn Ffiniau a Democratiaeth Leol Cymru; i wneud darpariaethau amrywiol sy'n ymwneud â llywodraeth leol; ac at ddibenion cysylltiedig.
Human Transplantation (Wales) Act 2013; Deddf Trawsblannu Dynol (Cymru) 2013	2013 anaw 5; 2013 dccc 5	10 September 2013
An Act of the National Assembly for Wales to make provision concerning the consent required for the removal, storage and use of human organs and tissue for the purpose of transplantation; and for connected purposes. Deddf gan Gynulliad Cenedlaethol Cymru i wneud darpariaeth ynglŷn â'r cydsyniad sy'n ofynnol ar gyfer tynnu, storio a defnyddio organau a meinweoedd dynol at ddiben trawsblannu; ac at ddibenion cysylltiedig.
Mobile Homes (Wales) Act 2013; Deddf Cartrefi Symudol (Cymru) 2013	2013 anaw 6; 2013 dccc 6	4 November 2013
An Act of the National Assembly for Wales to reform and restate the law relating to mobile home sites in Wales. Deddf gan Gynulliad Cenedlaethol Cymru i ddiwygio ac ailddatgan y gyfraith ynglŷn â safleoedd cartrefi symudol yng Nghymru.
Active Travel (Wales) Act 2013; Deddf Teithio Llesol (Cymru) 2013	2013 anaw 7; 2013 dccc 7	4 November 2013
An Act of the National Assembly for Wales to make provision for the mapping of active travel routes and related facilities and for and in connection with integrated network maps; for securing that there are new and improved active travel routes and related facilities; for requiring the Welsh Ministers and local authorities to take reasonable steps to enhance the provision made for, and to have regard to the needs of, walkers and cyclists; for requiring functions under the Act to be exercised so as to promote active travel journeys and secure new and improved active travel routes and related facilities; and for connected purposes. Deddf Cynulliad Cenedlaethol Cymru i wneud darpariaeth ar gyfer mapio llwybrau teithio llesol a chyfleusterau cysylltiedig ac ar gyfer mapiau rhwydwaith integredig ac mewn cysylltiad â'r mapiau hynny; ar gyfer sicrhau bod llwybrau teithio llesol a chyfleusterau cysylltiedig newydd a gwell; ar gyfer ei gwneud yn ofynnol i Weinidogion Cymru ac awdurdodau lleol gymryd camau rhesymol i wella'r ddarpariaeth ar gyfer cerddwyr a beicwyr, a rhoi sylw i'w hanghenion; ar gyfer ei gwneud yn ofynnol i swyddogaethau o dan y Ddeddf gael eu harfer er mwyn hyrwyddo teithiau teithio llesol a sicrhau llwybrau teithio llesol a chyfleusterau cysylltiedig newydd a gwell; ac at ddibenion cysylltiedig.
