= Prasanna Puwanarajah =

British actor

- Born: 1981 (age 44–45); Ipswich, Suffolk, England
- Education: New College, Oxford
- Occupation: Actor
- Years active: 2006–present

Prasanna Puwanarajah (Tamil: பிரசன்னா புவனராஜா; born 1981) is a British actor, director, writer, and former junior medical doctor.

== Early life and education ==
Puwanarajah was born at Ipswich Hospital in Suffolk to Tamil Sri Lankan parents from Sri Lanka. He spent his early childhood in Ipswich before the family moved to Hampshire when he was four. He participated in school plays and spent a season with the National Youth Theatre, but thought of acting as more of an interest than a career choice at the time.

He trained in Medicine at New College, Oxford. He worked in the NHS as a hospital junior doctor for a period of 4 years and prior to commencing a training post in reconstructive surgery, Puwanarajah took a year away from medicine. It was during this time he began working as a director, actor and writer.

== Personal life ==
As of 2019, Puwanarajah was living in north-west London.

== Filmography ==
=== Film ===
| Year | Title | Role | Notes |
| 2009 | Clamp and Grind | —N/a | Director, writer, producer; short film |
| 2010 | London Assurance | Servant | National Theatre Live |
| 2010 | Hamlet | Guildenstern | National Theatre Live |
| 2011 | The Half-Light | —N/a | Director, writer; short film |
| 2012 | Boy | —N/a | Writer; short film |
| 2013 | Möbius | Saïd | |
| 2015 | The Gunman | Doctor | |
| 2015 | The Baby Shower | Eric | Short film |
| 2020 | Dara | Talib | National Theatre Live |
| 2023 | Malcolm | Joe | |
| 2023 | Ballywalter | —N/a | Director |
| 2026 | Finding Emily | Professor Westlake | |

=== Television ===
| Year | Title | Role | Notes |
|---|---|---|---|
| 2008 | The Sarah Jane Adventures | Car Salesman | Episode: "The Mark of the Berserker: Part 2" |
| 2012 | Coming Up | Director | Episode Title: "Spoof or Die" |
| 2012–2014 | Silk | Dr Malik | 3 episodes |
| 2015 | Critical | Ramakrishna Chandramohan | Main role |
| 2015 | The Vote | Tom Baird | Television film |
| 2015 | New Tricks | Sanjeev Da Silva | Episode: "Prodigal Sons" |
| 2015 | You, Me and the Apocalypse | Rajesh McNeil | Miniseries; main role |
| 2016 | Cold Feet | Sam Harvey | 1 episode |
| 2017 | Doctor Foster | James Mohan | Series 2 (4 episodes) |
| 2018 | Patrick Melrose | Johnny Hall | Miniseries |
| 2018–2019 | Defending the Guilty | Ashley Jeevaratnam | Main role |
| 2019 | Mum | Kumar | Episode: "Monday" |
| 2019 | World on Fire | Major Taylor | 2 episodes |
| 2020 | Unprecedented: Real Time Theatre from a State of Isolation | Writer | Episode Title: Fear Fatigue |
| 2021 | Line of Duty | Haran Nadaraja | Series 6 |
| 2021 | Three Families | David Fortress | Part 2 |
| 2022 | Ten Percent | Dan | 8 episodes |
| 2022 | The Crown | Martin Bashir | Guest Star (Season 5) Nominated: Gold Derby Awards 2023 |
| 2023 | Payback | DC Jibran Khan | |
| 2024 | Breathtaking | Co-Showrunner / Co-Writer / Executive Producer | Nominated: Best Limited Series, RTS Awards 2025 |
| 2025 | Too Much | Auggie | Guest Star (Season 1) |
| 2027 | Neuromancer | Darvin Mitnik | Guest Star (Season 1) |

== Stage ==
| Year | Title | Role | Notes | Nominations |
|---|---|---|---|---|
| 2007 | Romeo & Juliet | Escalus | Battersea Arts Centre, London | |
| 2008 | Something I Wrote in a Hurry | Director | Tabard Theatre, London | |
| 2009 | On the Harmful Effects of Tobacco | Director | New End Theatre, London | |
| 2009 | Thyestes | Messenger | Arcola Theatre, London | Ian Charleson Awards: Commendation |
| 2009 | Twelfth Night | Priest | Courtyard Theatre, Stratford-upon-Avon / Duke of York's Theatre, London | |
| 2009 | Amadeus | | North Wall Theatre, Oxford | |
| 2010 | London Assurance | Servant | Royal National Theatre, London | |
| 2010 | Hamlet | Guildenstern | Royal National Theatre, London | |
| 2010 | The Wages of Thin | Director | Old Red Lion Theatre, London | Whatsonstage Awards: Nominated Best Regional Play |
| 2011 | Emperor and Galilean | Medon / Oribasius | Royal National Theatre, London | |
| 2011 | Nightwatchman | | Writer; Part of Double Feature at the Royal National Theatre, London | |
| 2013 | Moth | Director | HighTide Festival, Aldeburgh / Bush Theatre, London | |
| 2013–2014 | Henry V | Montjoy | Noël Coward Theatre, London | |
| 2014 | Peddling | —N/a | Director; HighTide Festival, Aldeburgh / Arcola Theatre, London / 59E59 Theaters, New York | |
| 2014 | Dara | Talib | Royal National Theatre, London | |
| 2015 | The Iliad and The Odyssey | | Almeida Theatre, London | |
| 2015 | Macbeth | Banquo | Young Vic, London | |
| 2017–2018 | The Reluctant Fundamentalist | Director | Yard Theatre, London | WINNER: Lustrum Award; NOMINATED: Amnesty International Freedom of Expression Award; SHORTLISTED: Carol Tambor Award |
| 2018 | Absolute Hell | Nigel Childs | Royal National Theatre, London | |
| 2019 | Venice Preserved | Director | Swan Theatre, Stratford-upon-Avon | |
| 2024 | Twelfth Night | Director | Royal Shakespeare Theatre, Stratford-upon-Avon | WINNER: UK Theatre Award Best Director |
| 2025 | Twelfth Night | Director | Barbican Theatre, London | |
| 2026 | Arcadia (play) | Bernard Nightingale | The Old Vic, London | |
| 2026 | 45 Years | Director | Minerva Theatre, Chichester Festival Theatre | |

== Awards and nominations ==
| Year | Award | Category | Production | Result |
|---|---|---|---|---|
| 2009 | Ian Charleson Awards | Actor | Thyestes | Nominated |
| 2023 | British Independent Film Awards | Director | Ballywalter | Longlisted |
| 2023 | Gold Derby Awards | Drama Guest Actor | The Crown | Nominated |
| 2025 | UK Theatre Awards | Director | Twelfth Night | Won |
