= Rachel Clarke =

British physician and writer

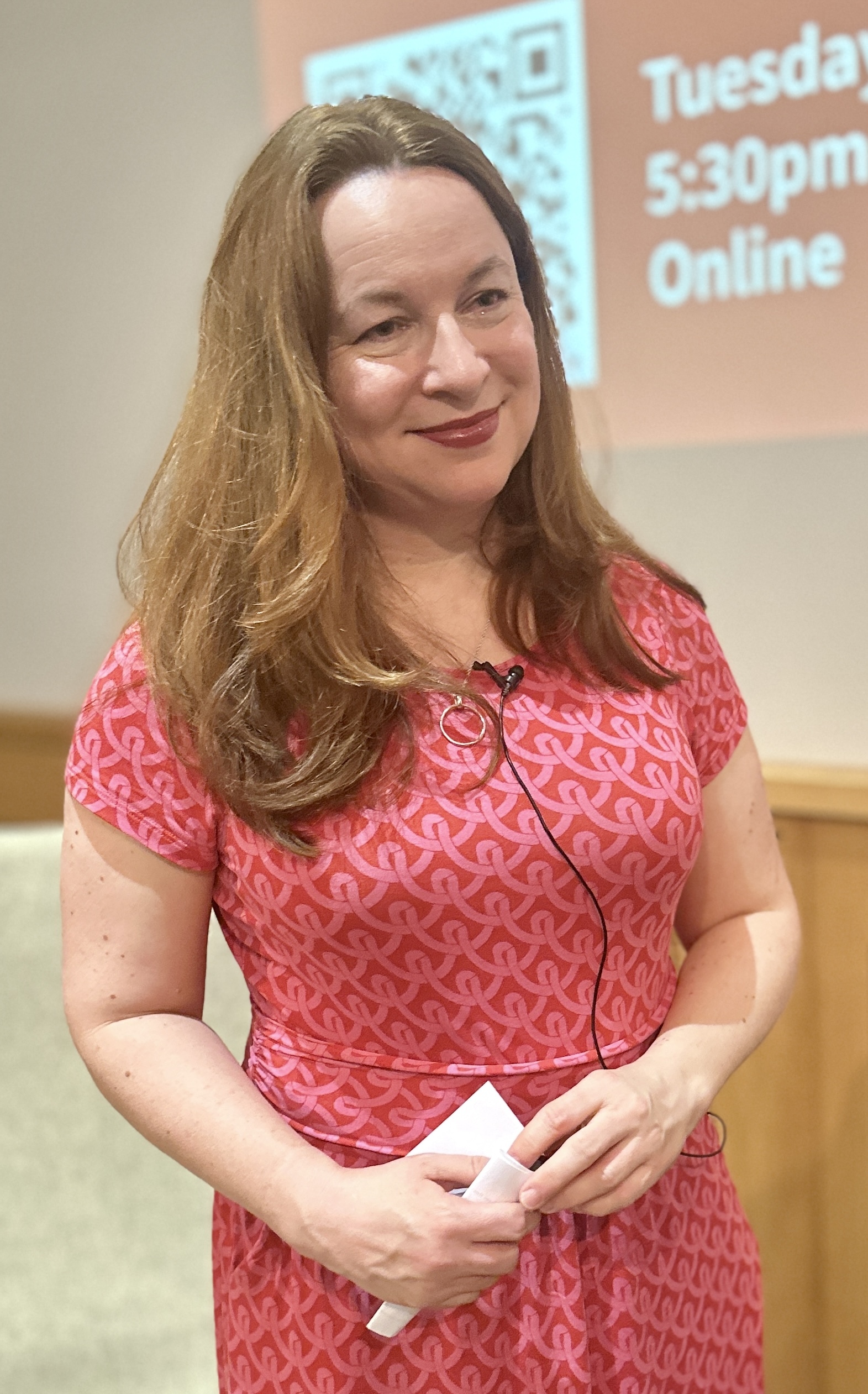
- Rachel Clarke, Royal Society of Medicine, London (2024)
- Born: 1972 (age 53–54); Wiltshire, England
- Education: Oxford University; University College London
- Medical career
- Profession: Physician
- Field: Palliative care
- Institutions: Oxford University; University College London
- Notable works: Your Life in My Hands (2017); Dear Life (2020); Breathtaking (2021); The Story of a Heart (2024)
- Awards: Women's Prize for Non-Fiction (2025)

Rachel Clarke (née Rendall, born 1972) is a British writer and physician, specialising in palliative and end of life care and working in Great Western Hospital. She is the author of Breathtaking (2021), an account of working inside the NHS during the UK's first wave of COVID-19, a work that formed the basis of a TV series of the same name. Her former works include her memoir about life as a newly qualified medical practitioner, Your Life in My Hands (2017), and Dear Life (2020), which explores death, dying and end-of-life care.

Formerly a current affairs journalist, covering topics that included Al Qaeda, the Gulf War, and the Second Congo War, she subsequently attended medical school from 2003, qualifying as a doctor in 2009. During 2015–2016, she had an active voice in the dispute in the United Kingdom between newly qualified physicians and the government over their contractual conditions of work, appearing in multiple television debates and interviews.

== Early life and education ==
Rachel Clarke was born in Wiltshire in 1972, to Mark Rendall, a general practitioner, and Dorothy, a nurse. She has a twin sister, and one brother. In 1993, she graduated in philosophy, politics and economics, from the University of Oxford. She married commercial pilot and former fighter pilot Dave.

== Early career ==
Clarke worked as a broadcast journalist prior to her career in medicine. She produced and directed current affairs documentaries for Channel 4 and the BBC focusing on subjects that included Al Qaeda, the Gulf War, and the civil war in the Democratic Republic of Congo. At the age of 29, she began a medical degree at University College, London, later transferring to Oxford for her clinical training, where she graduated and began her first medical posts in 2009.

== NHS campaigning ==
Clarke's campaigning began when the Secretary of State for Health, Jeremy Hunt, sought to impose a new contract upon junior doctors. She rose to prominence as a political campaigner in her opposition to the contract. She argued in print and on screen that imposition would irrevocably damage the NHS. In particular, she was concerned that doctors would be unable to maintain their compassion and empathy, the attributes that drew them in to the profession in the first place. Clarke was interviewed multiple times during the COVID-19 Coronavirus pandemic in spring 2020 and was a panellist on the BBC's Question Time on 16 April.

Clarke has criticised the 'Clap for Tom' following the death of Captain Sir Tom Moore as a shallow gesture, saying: "I cannot clap when 100k like Capt Tom have died ... Capt Tom was inspirational. But clapping doesn't feel right to me amid the vastness of our death & grief. Nor will clapping protect others."

On Twitter in late September 2021, then Telegraph cartoonist Bob Moran suggested Clarke deserved to be "verbally abused" after she tweeted that she had received verbal abuse for wearing a mask on public transport. In the exchange that followed, Clarke threatened to sue Moran for libel and accused him of inciting abuse. She further publicly tweeted at Moran's employer, the Telegraph, asking why they employ someone who abused NHS staff. On 13 October 2021, Press Gazette reported The Telegraph had sacked Moran over the comments. Following reports Moran had been suspended from his job, he had apologised a week earlier.

== Books ==
Her debut book, Your Life in My Hands, was published by Metro Books in July 2017. The book covers her experiences working as a junior doctor on call, handling pain and trauma, NHS funding and the recruitment and retention of doctors and nurses, as well as her campaign against the UK Government's imposition of a contract on junior doctors. It was a Sunday Times best seller.

Her second book, Dear Life, exploring end-of-life care, was published by Little, Brown in January 2020. It was long-listed for the 2020 Baillie Gifford Prize and short-listed for the 2020 Costa Book Awards. Robert Macfarlane described it as a remarkable book: "tender, funny, brave, heartfelt, radiant with love and life. It brought me often to laughter and - several times - to tears. It sings with joy and kindness".

Clarke's book Breathtaking was published by Little, Brown and Company in 2021. It is based on the COVID-19 pandemic in the United Kingdom, and is the basis of a TV series of the same name. Based on her own experiences caring for people with COVID-19, in addition to interviews with colleagues, patients and their families, it reveals what life was like inside the NHS during the first wave of COVID-19 in the UK.

Clarke's 2024 book The Story of a Heart was awarded the 2025 Women's Prize for Non-Fiction.
