= The Story of a Heart =

2024 non-fiction book by Rachel Clarke

The Story of a Heart: Two Families, One Heart, and a Medical Miracle
- Author: Rachel Clarke
- Language: English
- Genre: Biography; Popular science
- Publisher: Little, Brown Book Group
- Publication date: 3 September 2024 (hardback); 5 June 2025 (paperback)
- Publication place: United Kingdom
- Media type: Print (hardback, paperback)
- Pages: 320 (hardback); 288 (paperback)
- ISBN: 978-0-3491-4561-7

The Story of a Heart: Two Families, One Heart, and a Medical Miracle is a 2024 non-fiction book by British writer and doctor Rachel Clarke. It describes the story of a heart transplant between two children, Keira and Max, as well as the staff that treat them and the scientific and medical background which allows the treatment to work. The book won the 2025 Women's Prize for Non-Fiction and was shortlisted for the 2024 Baillie Gifford Prize for Non-Fiction.

== Narrative ==
Clarke's book follows the process of a heart transplant between Keira Ball, a 9-year-old girl from Devon who had been left brain dead after a car accident, and Max Johnson, another 9-year-old from Manchester who was suffering from dilated cardiomyopathy after a viral infection, in 2017.

Seven months before the transplant, Max had been admitted to Royal Manchester Children's Hospital, after developing a cough and worsening shortness of breath. Max's condition was initially stabilised with milrinone but he then deteriorated, becoming weak and struggling to breathe.

When Keira's crash occurs on 30 July 2017, she is taken first to North Devon District Hospital and then to Bristol Royal Hospital for Children where a CT angiogram shows her to likely be brain dead. She scores only a 3 on the Glasgow Coma Scale compared to a score of 15 for a fully conscious individual. Keira's family quickly decide they wish to donate her organs.

Max, now at the Freeman Hospital in Newcastle-upon-Tyne, is at the top of the transplant list for Keira's heart, having been waiting for a transplant for 196 days. Within a number of hours, Keira's heart is being flown from Bristol to Newcastle where it is successfully transplanted into Max. The two families later meet and Keira's family use a stethoscope to listen to Keira's heart inside Max's chest.

The story is interleaved with other narratives which show the background to the processes occurring in the book. These include the history of organ transplant, the creation of emergency trauma management procedures by James Styner, and Bjørn Ibsen's invention of one of the first artificial ventilators.

== Publication ==
The book was first published as hardback on 3 September 2024 by Abacus, an imprint of Little, Brown Book Group. The paperback edition was published on 5 June 2025.

== Response ==
Kirkus Reviews described the book as a "poignantly celebratory tale". Trisha Greenhalgh, writing for BJGP Life, said the narrative made for "a gripping story" and was "faultlessly told". She noted that the book would highlight the Organ Donation (Deemed Consent) Act 2019, informally known as Max and Keira's Law.

The book won the Women's Prize for Non-Fiction in 2025. Kavita Puri, the prize's lead judge, commented that "Clarke's writing is authoritative, beautiful and compassionate" and commended the book's research as "meticulous". It was also shortlisted for the 2024 Baillie Gifford Prize for Non-Fiction, where it was described as "a testament to compassion for the dying, the many ways we honour our loved ones, and the tenacity of love."

Sam Leith chose The Story of a Heart as one of The Spectator's Books of the Year in 2024. Anjana Ahuja also chose it as one of The New Statesman's Books of the Year. The book was also named one of the best popular science books of the year by The New Scientist and one of the books of the year by Prospect Magazine.
