= Active Travel (Wales) Act 2013 =

Act of the National Assembly for Wales

- Act of the National Assembly for Wales
- National Assembly for Wales
- Long title: An Act of the National Assembly for Wales to make provision for the mapping of active travel routes and related facilities and for and in connection with integrated network maps; for securing that there are new and improved active travel routes and related facilities; for requiring the Welsh Ministers and local authorities to take reasonable steps to enhance the provision made for, and to have regard to the needs of, walkers and cyclists; for requiring functions under the Act to be exercised so as to promote active travel journeys and secure new and improved active travel routes and related facilities; and for connected purposes.
- Citation: 2013 anaw 7
- Introduced by: Carl Sargeant

Dates
- Royal assent: 4 November 2013

Status: Current legislation

Text of statute as originally enacted

Text of the Active Travel (Wales) Act 2013 as in force today (including any amendments) within the United Kingdom, from legislation.gov.uk.

The Active Travel (Wales) Act 2013 (anaw 7) (Welsh: Deddf Teithio Llesol (Cymru) 2013) is an act of the National Assembly for Wales that was given royal assent on 4 November 2013.

== Provisions ==
The act requires local authorities to continuously improve facilities and routes for pedestrians and cyclists and to prepare maps identifying current and potential future routes for their use. The act also requires new road schemes (including road improvement schemes) to consider the needs of pedestrians and cyclists at design stage. The law was passed after a six-year campaign led by Lee Waters, then director of Sustrans Cymru.

== Implementation ==
In 2016, 'lack of funds and leadership' and resistance from highways engineers, were among the factors blamed for the failure of the Act to deliver its potential.

== Implementation ==
In 2018, a report from the National Assembly's Economy, Infrastructure and Skills (EIS) Committee on the Active Travel Act, led by Lee Waters, found no increase in the numbers of people walking and cycling to work; the numbers going to school had actually declined. The report blamed a lack of leadership in councils and the Welsh Government.
