= Health impact of light rail systems =

Below are health impacts of light rail systems.

== Reduction in obesity ==
Research shows that using light rail increases walking. Frank et al. (2004) report that obesity around Atlanta, as measured by body mass index (BMI), is associated positively with time spent in cars and negatively with mixed land-use (such as incorporating Light Rail transit) and with walking. There is also research which suggests that utilizing Light Rail transit increases physical activity even compared to riding the bus. Users of public transit who do not use trains, including light rail, walk an additional six minutes compared with non-users, whereas those who use trains including light rail walk an additional 4.5 minutes, for a total of 10.5 extra minutes per day. Additionally, MacDonald, et al. (2010) used data collected pre and post light rail development in Charlotte, North Carolina to determine that residents who commuted via light rail had 81% reduced odds of becoming obese.

Moreover, bicycle access to light rail transit can increase physical activity, as people will generally bicycle three to five miles to transit, as opposed the one‐half mile distance the average person is willing to walk. Research also shows that less time spent driving results in a reduced stress level, resulting in a higher quality of life.

Though there are significant potential public health benefits due to light rail, some studies have indicated the discrepancy between the enormous costs of building and operating light rail and its significant, but certainly smaller potential benefit to public health costs (estimated at $12.6 million savings over 9 years).

== Air quality ==
One electric light rail train produces about 62 percent less carbon monoxide and hydrocarbon emissions per mile than one automobile does. A report from the American Public Transit Association (APTA) presents evidence that each person riding light rail transit versus driving an automobile for one year reduces hydrocarbon emission by nine pounds, nitrogen oxide emissions by five pounds and carbon monoxide emissions by 62.5 pounds.

== Negative consequences ==
Some negative consequences are increases in noise level, loss of wetlands, adverse impacts to historic sites, gentrification, and risk of displacement. A 2011 study done by Human Impact Partners in Minnesota showed that light rail and RTD expansion in their communities had at least one if not all of these negative outcomes: higher rate of residential and business displacement, increase in housing values causing fewer vacancies and a decrease in affordable housing, and displacement of existing residents—especially low income residents. The study showed that there was a disproportionate impact on minorities and people with lower socio-economic status compared to European people and people with high socio-economic status. Moreover, the risk of displacement can also lead to negative health outcomes such as infectious disease, chronic disease, stress, and impeded child development due to lack of sense of belonging and association to a particular community.

== Injury hazards ==
Automobile injury hazards arise due to existing light rails. Coifman et al. (1997) concluded that drivers engage in undesirable behaviors or actions which are difficult for light rail operators to respond to due to insufficient warning time. Driver's actions such as disobedience to traffic rules and signs, as well as failure to perceive due to poor stimulus observability are factors of hazard causation. Additional factors include the misinterpretation of a light rail vehicle horn as another automobile's horn, and the driver's expectation of a normal intersection when in actuality the intersection includes a light rail crossing.

Pedestrians are also at risk of being injured by light rail vehicles, either by crossing rail tracks or ignoring traffic signs, especially where there is limited walkability to safely access the rail stop area. Currently, there is minimal literature available for pedestrian and automobile safety measures and traffic safety concerns (Brown et al., 2011). Further investigation and data collection is needed to accurately assess these risks.

== Access and mobility ==
Chronic diseases are highly prevalent among individuals who do not have convenient food access. Many residents of food deserts rely on convenience stores, liquor stores, gas stations and drug stores to provide food items (Colorado Health Foundation, 2009).

According to the Centers for Disease Control, minorities and individuals from low socioeconomic status are more likely than average to use public transit as their principle mode for commuting. However, they are often displaced disproportionately with light rail expansion. The most effective predictors of health, according to the National Institutes of Health, are income, poverty, population density, access to public transportation, access to affordable housing, environmental pollution (air and water). Public transportation is found to be one of many necessary components of improving health of individuals of low socioeconomic status.

== Economic growth and development ==
According to RTD (2012), when new development occurs near stations, it increases the likelihood that residents and workers will choose transit as their transportation mode. This reduces the growth in vehicle miles traveled (VMT) and auto trips on a constrained roadway system while, at the same time, accommodating new growth.

Furthermore, according to The Housing + Transportation Affordability Index (2012), housing near transit provides residents with an opportunity to decrease their combined household and transportation costs. Residents in locations with close proximity to transit, shorter distances to major employment, and lower vehicle ownership have lower monthly transportation costs.

The effect of displacement on communities, especially low socioeconomic communities, cannot be underestimated. Public transportation is an important resource for low socioeconomic communities. However, with light rail developments, there is national precedent for the displacement and tremendous negative impacts upon low socioeconomic communities. Both residential and business displacement can have significant negative impacts on health of already vulnerable communities. As housing values rise and fewer vacancies exist, the displacement of existing residents, especially low income residents, begins to happen. This places a disproportionate impact on minorities compared with Europeans. This displacement can have multiple negative impacts, including negative health outcomes including infectious disease, chronic disease, stress and impeded child development.

RTD would be wise to look to Minnesota to find how their Transit Oriented Development addressed the economic and public health needs of the communities affected by the placement of light rail. For example, using restorative investment to ensure that low socioeconomic communities are not unduly burdened and pushed aside as light rail tends to gentrify neighborhoods beyond the reach of the poor; opening access to opportunity by rethinking zoning policies, de-concentrating subsidized housing, re-thinking school boundaries; and growing a community together to ensure there are healthy environments for all –not just those who are passing through on light rail or moving to newly renovated areas.

== Assessment and Advocacy ==
The CDC, WHO and American Public Health Association all advocate that "Health Impact Assessments can help ensure health is considered when shaping future transportation policy". This claim is supported by a growing body of research on Health Impact Assessment Best Practices. Some transit companies have faced criticism for lacking research and consideration for health impacts. For example, Denver, Colorado's FasTracks received criticism for failing to conduct health impact assessments for the majority of its proposed stops. RTD does recognize the public health value it provides and its RTD Strategic Plan for Transit Oriented Development indicates its goal to "develop safe, reliable and economical transportation choices to decrease household transportation costs, reduce our nation's dependence on foreign oil, improve air quality, reduce greenhouse gas emissions and promote public health" (Section 2-3) RTD has conducted a Quality of Life (QoL) study for the neighborhoods' impacted by FasTracks with baseline data collection starting in 2006 and continuing bi-annually to the present. The QoL study tracks a number of economic and community development indicators; however, the study has no direct measures of public health impacts.
