= Human Tissue Act 2004 =

Act of Parliament of the United Kingdom

Human Tissue Act 2004 (Note: Section 61)
- Act of Parliament
- Parliament of the United Kingdom
- Long title: An Act to make provision with respect to activities involving human tissue; to make provision about the transfer of human remains from certain museum collections; and for connected purposes.
- Citation: 2004 c. 30
- Territorial extent: England and Wales; Northern Ireland; Scotland (in part); (Note: Section 59.)

Dates
- Royal assent: 15 November 2004
- Commencement: Various (Note: Section 60.)
Other legislation
Amends	Wills Act 1837; Public Records Act 1958; Parliamentary Commissioner Act 1967; House of Commons Disqualification Act 1975; Northern Ireland Assembly Disqualification Act 1975; Anatomy Act 1984; Coroners Act 1988; Human Organ Transplants Act 1989; National Health Service and Community Care Act 1990; Human Fertilisation and Embryology Act 1990; Health Authorities Act 1995; Freedom of Information Act 2000; Criminal Justice and Police Act 2001; Asylum and Immigration (Treatment of Claimants, etc.) Act 2004
Repeals/revokes	Human Tissue Act 1961; Human Tissue Act (Northern Ireland) 1962; Anatomy Act 1984; Corneal Tissue Act 1986; Corneal Tissue (Northern Ireland) Order 1988; Human Organ Transplants Act 1989; Human Organ Transplants (Northern Ireland) Order 1989; Health and Personal Social Services (Northern Ireland) Order 1991; Anatomy (Northern Ireland) Order 1992
Amended by	Civil Partnership Act 2004 (Overseas Relationships and Consequential, etc. Amendments) Order 2005; Armed Forces Act 2006; Human Tissue (Quality and Safety for Human Application) Regulations 2007; Human Fertilisation and Embryology Act 2008; Coroners and Justice Act 2009; Health Act 2009; Quality and Safety of Organs Intended for Transplantation Regulations 2012; Tribunals, Courts and Enforcement Act 2007 (Consequential Amendments) Order 2012; Criminal Justice Act (Northern Ireland) 2013; Human Transplantation (Wales) Act 2013; Human Transplantation (Wales) Act 2013 (Consequential Provision) Order 2015; Human Tissue (Quality and Safety for Human Application) (Amendment) Regulations 2018; Organ Donation (Deemed Consent) Act 2019; Human Tissue (Quality and Safety for Human Application) (Amendment) (EU Exit) Regulations 2019; Sentencing Act 2020; Organ and Tissue Donation (Deemed Consent) Act (Northern Ireland) 2022; Criminal Justice Act 2003 (Commencement No. 33) and Sentencing Act 2020 (Commencement No. 2) Regulations 2022; Judicial Review and Courts Act 2022 (Magistrates’ Court Sentencing Powers) Regulations 2023; Medical Devices (In Vitro Diagnostic Devices etc.) (Amendment) Regulations 2024
Relates to	Human Tissue (Scotland) Act 2006; Human Transplantation (Wales) Act 2013

Status: Amended

Text of statute as originally enacted

Revised text of statute as amended

The Human Tissue Act 2004 (c. 30) is an act of the Parliament of the United Kingdom, that applies to England, Northern Ireland and Wales, which consolidated previous legislation and created the Human Tissue Authority to "regulate the removal, storage, use and disposal of human bodies, organs and tissue." The act does not extend to Scotland; its counterpart there is the Human Tissue (Scotland) Act 2006.

== Background ==
The act was brought about as a consequence of, among things, the Alder Hey organs scandal, in which organs of children had been retained by the Alder Hey Children's Hospital without consent, and the Kennedy inquiry into heart surgery on children at the Bristol Royal Infirmary. A consultative exercise followed the Government's Green Paper, Human Bodies, Human Choices (2002), and earlier recommendations by the Chief Medical Officer, Sir Liam Donaldson.

== The act ==
The act allows for anonymous organ donation (previously, living people could only donate organs to those to whom they had a genetic or emotional connection), and requires licences for those intending to publicly display human remains, such as BODIES... The Exhibition. Recent calls have been made for the reform of this Act due growing concerns around the sale and trade of human remains.

The act also specifies that in cases of organ donation after death the wishes of the deceased takes precedence over the wishes of relatives, but a parliamentary report concluded in 2006 that the Act likely would fail in this regard since most surgeons would be unwilling to confront families in such situations.

The act prohibits selling organs. In 2007 a man became the first person convicted under the Act for trying to sell his kidney online for £24,000 in order to pay off his gambling debts.

== Regulations ==
The following orders have been made under this section:

- The Human Tissue Act 2004 (Commencement No. 1) Order 2005 (S.I. 2005/919)
- The Human Tissue Act 2004 (Commencement No. 2) Order 2005 (S.I. 2005/2632 (C. 108))
- The Human Tissue Act 2004 (Commencement No. 3 and Transitional Provisions) Order 2005 (S.I. 2005/2792 (C. 115))
- The Human Tissue Act 2004 (Commencement No. 4 and Transitional Provisions) Order 2006
- The Human Tissue Act 2004 (Commencement No. 5 and Transitional Provisions) Order 2006 (S.I. 2006/1997 (C. 68))
- The Human Tissue Act 2004 (Commencement No.5 and Transitional Provisions) (Amendment) Order 2006 (S.I. 2006/2169)

== Application ==
There is no official report on the number of restitutions that have been permitted under the Human Tissue Act 2004. In the United Kingdom, museums are not required to disclose such information. The table below therefore establishes a non-exhaustive list of human remains that have been restituted following the implementation of the Human Tissue Act.

Institution	Applicant	Object of the request	Outcome of the request	Date and place of return	Source
British Museum	The Tasmanian Aboriginal Centre and the Australian Government	Two Cremation Ash Bundles	Approved	2006 – Tasmania Aboriginal Centre	
British Museum	New Zealand Te Papa Tongarewa	Seven preserved tattooed heads and nine human bone fragments	Partially Approved	2008 – Te Papa Tongarewa, New Zealand	
British Museum	The Torres Strait Islander traditional owners with the support of the Australian Government	Two modified skulls	Rejected	-	
World Museum of Liverpool	Unknown	Five human remains	Approved	2007 – Museum of New Zealand Te Papa Tongarewa	
World Museum of Liverpool	Australian Office of Indigenous Policy Coordination – Australian Government	A skull	Approved	2009 – Ngarrindjeri people in Australia	
World Museum of Liverpool	Unknown	A mummified baby	Approved	2010 – Meuram Tribe from the Torres Strait Islands	
National History Museum of London	Unknown	Torres Strait Islander Bones	Approved	2007	

== See also ==
- Human Transplantation (Wales) Act 2013
