= Organ Donation (Deemed Consent) Act 2019 =

Act of the Parliament of the United Kingdom

Organ Donation (Deemed Consent) Act 2019 (Note: Section 3(4).)
- Act of Parliament
- Parliament of the United Kingdom
- Long title: An Act to make amendments of the Human Tissue Act 2004 concerning consent to activities done for the purpose of transplantation; and for connected purposes.
- Citation: 2019 c. 7
- Introduced by: Geoffrey Robinson (Commons); Philip Hunt, Baron Hunt of Kings Heath (Lords)
- Territorial extent: England and Wales; Northern Ireland; (Note: Section 3(1).)

Dates
- Royal assent: 15 March 2019
- Commencement: 15 March 2019 (section 3; 1 October 2019 (rest of act); (Note: Section 3(2)–(3). The Organ Donation (Deemed Consent) Act 2019 (Commencement No. 1) Regulations 2019.)
Other legislation
Amends	Human Tissue Act 2004

Status: Current legislation

History of passage through Parliament

Text of statute as originally enacted

Revised text of statute as amended

The Organ Donation (Deemed Consent) Act 2019 (c. 7) is an act of the Parliament of the United Kingdom. The act changed the law regarding organ donation so that unless someone expressly opted out, they would be deemed as having given consent. It was a private member's bill introduced by Geoffrey Robinson and Lord Hunt of Kings Heath.

== Provisions ==
The provisions of the act include:

- Amending the Human Tissue Act 2004 to change organ donation in England, Wales and Northern Ireland to an opt-out programme.
- Excepting adults who have not been resident in England for 12 months prior to their death or one who for a significant period before their death lacked the capacity to consent.

== Legacy ==
The Organ Donation (Deemed Consent) Act 2019 was dubbed "Max and Keira's Law", after Keira Ball, a nine-year-old child who was killed in a traffic accident whose heart was donated to Max Johnson, another nine year old.

The chair of the Medical Ethics committee of the British Medical Association, John Chisholm said the association was "delighted" with the Bill's passing and that the law would "maximise the number of lives that can be saved".

Some critics argued that the NHS would need the money and infrastructure to cope with the change. Elsewhere, the law prompted discussions about the relationship between organ donation and religious beliefs and practices.

Questions were also raised over how effective 'deemed consent' laws were after it was reported that organ donation had not increased significantly after Wales implemented an opt-out system.

== See also ==
- Healthcare in the United Kingdom
- The Story of a Heart, a book about Keira Ball and Max Johnson's heart transplant
