= Human Tissue (Scotland) Act 2006 =

Act of the Scottish Parliament

Human Tissue (Scotland) Act
- Act of the Scottish Parliament
- Scottish Parliament
- Long title: An Act of the Scottish Parliament to make provision in relation to activities involving human tissue.
- Citation: 2006 asp 4
- Territorial extent: Scotland

Dates
- Royal assent: 16 March 2006
Other legislation
Amended by	Human Tissue (Authorisation) (Scotland) Act 2019
Relates to	Human Tissue Act 2004

Status: Amended

Text of statute as originally enacted

Text of the Human Tissue (Scotland) Act 2006 as in force today (including any amendments) within the United Kingdom, from legislation.gov.uk.

The Human Tissue (Scotland) Act 2006 (asp 4) is an act of the Scottish Parliament.

== Provisions ==
The act was enacted to consolidate and modernise the legal framework governing the removal, retention, and use of human tissue in Scotland. It replaces earlier legislation, including aspects of the Anatomy Act 1984, and addresses ethical and legal concerns that had emerged in the early 2000s concerning the treatment of human remains. The act regulates three principal uses of human tissue: its donation—primarily for transplantation, but also for research, education or training, and audit purposes; its removal, retention and use following a post-mortem examination; and its regulated use in anatomical examination and display.

By introducing the principle of "authorisation" (analogous to "consent" in other jurisdictions), the act aims to ensure that an individual's wishes regarding the use of their body or body parts after death are respected. Its provisions represent a distinct legal approach from that adopted elsewhere in the United Kingdom, where the comparable legislation is the Human Tissue Act 2004.

Universities can keep body for up to three years under the act, and they can keep body parts for longer if the donor consents.

== Amendment ==
In June 2017, the Scottish Government announced its intention to introduce legislation establishing an opt-out system for organ donation, with the objective of increasing donation rates. This policy was implemented on 26 March 2021 through the Human Tissue (Authorisation) (Scotland) Act 2019, which introduced a system of deemed authorisation for organ and tissue donation. Under this system, adults are presumed to have authorised donation unless they have explicitly opted out. Healthcare professionals are required to make reasonable efforts to determine the wishes of the deceased before proceeding.
