= Rhizobium binae =

Scientific classification
- Domain: Bacteria
- Kingdom: Pseudomonadati
- Phylum: Pseudomonadota
- Class: Alphaproteobacteria
- Order: Hyphomicrobiales
- Family: Rhizobiaceae
- Genus: Rhizobium
- Species: R. binae

Binomial name
- Rhizobium binae Harun-or Rashid et al. 2015

Species of bacterium

Rhizobium binae is a gram-negative bacterium which was isolated from root nodules of lentils in Bangladesh.

== Description ==
Rhizobium binae are rod-shaped bacteria found in the soil. They require oxygen and do not form spores.

Rhizobium binae grow well on YEMA medium agar, where they form colonies which are circular, convex and creamy white. Strains survive at pH values between 5.5 and 10. They are very sensitive to ampicillin and resistant to kanamycin and nalidixic acid. Strains do not tolerate tetracycline and do not grow on LB medium.

Rhizobium binae can utilize a variety of nutrients, including dextrin, D-maltose, D-trehalose, D-cellobiose, gentiobiose, sucrose, D-raffinose, α-D-glucose, D-turanose, α-D lactose, D-fructose, D-melibiose, β-methyl-D-glucoside, salicin, N-acetyl-D-galactosamine, D-mannose, D-galactose, D-mannitol, D-sorrbitol, D-arabitol, glycerol, D-glucose-6-phosphate, D-fructose-6-phosphate, D-alanine, L-aspartic acid, L-histidine, l-pyroglutamic acid, quinic acid, D-saccharic acid, methyl pyruvate, L-lactic acid, citric acid, D-malic acid, L-malic acid, bromo-succinic acid, β-hydroxy-d,l-butyric acid and acetic acid. R. binae can not use the nutrients N-acetyle-D-mannosamine, 3-methyle glucose, inosine, glycyl-L-proline, L-arginine, D-galacturonic acid, D-glucuronic acid, glucuronamide, p-hydroxy-phenylacetic acid, D-lactic acid methyl ester, α-keto-glutaric acid, tween 40, propionic acid or formic acid.

Rhizobium binae can grow in the presence of the antibiotic compounds lincomycin and potassium tellurite, but not in the presence of 1% sodium lactate, troleandomycin, lithium chloride or sodium butyrate.

The type strain of R. binae is strain BLR195T (=LMG 28443T = DSM 29288T).

== Applications ==
Different strains of this species can form effective nodules and enhance growth of lentil, peas and lathyrus, and are useful for bio-fertilizer production.

== Genetics ==
Rhizobiu binae is genetically very similar to its close relatives Rhizobium etli and Rhizobum phaseoli. The GC-content of the DNA of the type strain of R. binae is 61.5%.

The genome sequence is available in NCBI and the European nucleotide archive.

== History ==
Rhizobium binae was first described in 2015 by M. Harun-or Rashid and others. It was isolated from the root nodules of Lens culinaris in the Feni district of Bangladesh. It was named "binae" as an abbreviation for Bangladesh Institute of Nuclear Agriculture, the research institute where the bacteria was originally studied.
