= Rhizobium bangladeshense =

Scientific classification
- Domain: Bacteria
- Kingdom: Pseudomonadati
- Phylum: Pseudomonadota
- Class: Alphaproteobacteria
- Order: Hyphomicrobiales
- Family: Rhizobiaceae
- Genus: Rhizobium
- Species: R. bangladeshense

Binomial name
- Rhizobium bangladeshense Harun-or Rashid et al. 2015

Species of bacterium

Rhizobium bangladeshense is a gram-negative bacterium which was isolated from root nodules of lentils in Bangladesh.

== Description ==
Rhizobium bangladeshense are rod-shaped bacteria which live in soil, particularly on the root nodules of plants. They require oxygen, and do not form spores.

When R. bangladeshense grow on agar plates, they form colonies which are circular, convex and creamy white on YEMA medium. Strains can tolerate pH values between 5.5 and 10. Strains that have been studied are sensitive to ampicillin, resistant to kanamycin and nalidixic acid, and grow well in YEMA medium containing 0.5% NaCl. Strains do not tolerate tetracycline and do not show any growth on LB medium.

Rhizobium bangladeshense can utilize a variety of nutrients for growth, including D-maltose, D-trehalose, D-cellobiose, gentiobiose, sucrose, D-raffinose, α-D-glucose, D-turanose, α-D lactose, D-fructose, β-methyl-D-glucoside, salicin, N-acetyl-D-galactosamine, D-sorbitol, D-mannitol, D-arbitol, glycerol, D-glucose-6-phosphate, D-gluconic acid, quinic acid, D-saccharic acid, D-lactic acid methyl ester, lactic acid, α-keto-glutaric acid and tween 40. Strains which have been studied failed to utilize dextrin, D-aspertic acid, glycyl-L-proline, L-alanine, L-arginine, L-glutamic acid, L-histidine, L-serine, mucic acid, p-hydroxy-phenylacetic acid, methyl pyruvate, citric acid, D-malic acid, L-malic acid, propionic acid or formic acid. R. bangladeshense can grow in the presence of lincomycin and potassium tellurite, but not with 1% sodium lactate, troleandomycin, tetrazolium violet, tetrazolium blue, Nalidixic acid, lithium chloride and sodium butyrate.

== Genetics ==
Genetic analysis of R. bangladeshense has shown it to be most closely related to Rhizobium etli and Rhizobium phaseoli. The DNA G+C content of type strain is 61%.

The genome for R. bangladeshense has been sequenced and is available from NCBI as well as the European nucleotide archive.

== Applications ==
Different strains of this species can form effective nodules and enhance growth of lentil, pea and lathyrus, and are useful for bio-fertilizer production.

== History ==
Rhizobium bangladeshense was originally isolated from root nodules of the lentil Lens culinaris in Khulna District, Bangladesh by M. Harun-or Rashid and others in 2015. The strain was named "bangladeshense" for the Latinized adjective meaning "from Bangladesh".
