= Rhizobium lentis =

Scientific classification
- Domain: Bacteria
- Kingdom: Pseudomonadati
- Phylum: Pseudomonadota
- Class: Alphaproteobacteria
- Order: Hyphomicrobiales
- Family: Rhizobiaceae
- Genus: Rhizobium
- Species: R. lentis

Binomial name
- Rhizobium lentis Harun-or Rashid et al. 2015

Species of bacterium

Rhizobium lentis is a gram-negative bacterium which was isolated from root nodules of lentils in Bangladesh.

== Description ==
Rhizobium lentis are rod-shaped bacteria found in the soil. They require oxygen and do not form spores.

Rhizobium lentis grow well on YEMA medium agar, where they form colonies which are circular, convex and creamy white. These bacteria grow at 12–37 °C but can survive at temperatures as low as 4 °C. Strains grow well at pH 5.5 to 8.2. Most of the strains studied are resistant to ampicillin, kanamycin and nalidixic acid. Strains do not tolerate tetracycline and do not show any growth on LB medium.

Rhizobium lentis can utilize α-D lactose, β-methyl-D-glucoside, D-sorbitol, D-mannito, D-arbitol-glycerol, D-fructose-6-phosphate, L-aspartic acid, D-gluconic acid, mucic acid, D-lactic acid methyl ester, L-lactic acid, L-histidine, β-hydroxy-D, L-butyric acid, D-malic acid, L-malic acid, acetic acid and formic acid. They are unable to utilize D-maltose, D-trehalose, D-cellobiose, gentiobiose, sucrose, D-raffinose, α-D-glucose, D-turanose, D-melibose, mannose, galactose, 3-methyle glucose, inosine, D-aspartic acid, glycyl-L-proline, L-alanine, L-arginine, L-serine, pectine, D-saccharic acid, p-hydroxy-phenylacetic acid, methyl pyruvate, citric acid, bromo-succinic acid, acetoacetic acid or propionic acid. R. lentis can grow in the presence of the antibiotic compounds lincomycin, tetrazolium violet and tetrazolium blue but not with 1% sodium lactate, troleandomycin, lithium chloride, potassium tellurite or sodium butyrate.

The type strain of R. lentis is BLR27T (= LMG 28441T = DSMZ 29286T).

== Applications ==
Different strains of this species can form nodules and enhance growth of lentil, peas and lathyrus.

== Genetics ==
Rhizobium lentis is genetically very closely related to the related species Rhizobium etli and Rhizobum phaseoli. The GC-content of the type strain's DNA is 61.1%.

The genome sequence is available from the National Center for Biotechnology Information and the European nucleotide archive.

== History ==
Rhizobium lentis was first described in 2015 after being isolated from root nodules of Lens culinaris in the Natore district of Bangladesh. It was named "lentis" in reference to Lens, the plant genus from which the bacteria were isolated.
