= Alexis Hartmann =

American pediatrician and clinical biochemist

- Born: October 30, 1898; St. Louis, Missouri
- Died: September 6, 1964 (aged 65)
- Education: Washington University in St. Louis
- Occupations: Pediatrician and clinical biochemist
- Known for: Ringer's lactate solution and developing a new technique to test blood sugar levels
- Relatives: Henry Charles Hartmann
- Medical career
- Institutions: St. Louis Children's Hospital; Washington University School of Medicine

Alexis Frank Hartmann Sr. (October 30, 1898 – September 6, 1964) was an American pediatrician and clinical biochemist. He added sodium lactate to Ringer's solution, creating what is now known as Ringer's lactate solution or Hartmann's solution for intravenous infusions.

== Early life ==
Hartmann was born on October 30, 1898, in St. Louis, Missouri. His parents were Henry Charles Hartmann, a general practitioner, and Bertha Hauck Griesedick; both were of German ancestry. He enrolled at Washington University in St. Louis, receiving a bachelor's degree in 1919 and master's and medical degrees in 1921. While he was a medical student, he developed a new technique to test blood sugar levels.

== Career ==
Hartmann completed his residency in pediatrics at St. Louis Children's Hospital in 1923. He was an instructor in pediatrics at Washington University School of Medicine and was promoted to assistant professor in 1925 then associate professor in 1927. He was promoted to a full professor in pediatrics and head of the pediatric department at Washington University in 1936. In the same year, he was appointed physician-in-chief at St. Louis Children's Hospital, and remained in the position when the hospital became racially integrated in 1950.

Hartmann published 90 papers during his career. His scientific work pertained to biochemistry and problems of metabolism, while his clinical pediatric interests included anoxia, hypoglycemia, nephritis, nephrosis and chemotherapy. He was among the first doctors to use insulin to treat diabetes in infants. His best known contribution to medicine was in body electrolytes and intravenous fluids replacement. He modified Ringer's solution by adding sodium lactate, an alkaline substance, to treat acidosis in children. His invention, Ringer's lactate solution, became popular internationally and is commonly known as Hartmann's solution.

== Personal life ==
Hartmann married Gertrude Krochmann, a librarian, in 1922. They had two children.

Hartmann retired in 1964 and died on September 6 of that same year.
