= Henseleit =

Henseleit is a German language surname. It stems from the German name Hänsel (meaning "little Hans"), a diminutive of the given name Hans, and may refer to:

- Esther Henseleit (born 1999), German professional golfer
- Kurt Henseleit (1908–1973), German chemist
