= In vitro muscle testing =

Testing of living muscle tissue outside of an organism

In vitro muscle testing is a method used to characterize properties of living muscle tissue after removing it from an organism, which allows more extensive and precise quantification of its properties than in vivo testing. In vitro muscle testing has provided the bulk of scientific knowledge of muscle structure and physiology, and how both relate to organismal performance. Stem cell research relies on in vitro muscle testing to establish sole muscle cell function and its individual behavior apart from muscle cells in the presence of nonmuscle cells seen in in vitro studies.

== Isolation of tissue ==
Once an appropriate animal has been selected—whether for a specific locomotor function (i.e. frogs for jumping); or a specific animal strain, to answer a research question—a specific muscle is identified based on its in vivo function and fibre type distribution. Following ethical approval, and if necessary, government approval, the animal is humanely euthanised. Humane methods differ by country, with the most appropriate based on ethical approval and researcher skill level. A number of further criteria should be followed to ensure the animal is completely dead without the possibility of recovery, which includes cessation of blood flow via the removal of the heart from the circulatory system and/or complete destruction of the brain and spinal column. Following this, common measures of animal morphology are usually rapidly obtained, such as animal length, body mass, and other biomechanical markers that may be of importance. The animal is then prepared for harvesting of the target muscle. In isolated muscles, these tend to be muscles of the hind limbs, such as the soleus or EDL of mammals, or the plantaris or iliotibialis of amphibians. Other muscles that have been examined in vitro include the diaphragm and the papillary muscle.

For the successful isolation of skeletal muscles, specific conditions are required. The tissue should be isolated in frequently changed, chilled Ringer's solution or Krebs-Henseleit solution to ensure metabolic conditions are slowed down, hence the need for chilled dissecting medium, and to prevent the tissue from dying due to lack of substrates within the medium, hence the requirement for the solutions to be changed frequently. The dissecting solution should be continually oxygenated with the appropriate concentration of oxygen and carbon dioxide for the tissue that is being prepared. Typically, non-mammalian tissues are prepared in a gaseous solution bubbled through with 98% oxygen, 2% carbon dioxide whilst mammalian tissues in a solution bubbled through with 95% oxygen, 5% carbon dioxide. A microscope with an appropriate magnification level is required due to the dexterity required for isolation of muscles. An external, fibre optic light source is also beneficial to provide sufficient light without the emission of heat.

There is no correct approach for the preparation of muscles for testing, as long as the muscle is not damaged during preparation, the muscle-tendon unit is intact and there is something that can be used to anchor the muscle within the testing rig. Pieces of bone can be left at the proximal and/or distal end of skeletal muscles to allow for anchoring. In addition, silk sutures or aluminium T-foil clips can be used to wrap around the tendon of the muscle to provide both support at the tendon and to be used for anchoring in the mechanics rig.

== Equipment ==
In vitro muscle testing typically requires a dual-mode servomotor, which can both control and detect changes in force and length. Should a dual-mode system be unavailable, then an independent force transducer and motor arm can be used. One end of the sample tissue is anchored in place, via a needle if sutured or crocodile clip if prepared with aluminium T-foil clips, while the other end is attached to the servomotor. The entire muscle is bathed in Ringer's solution or Krebs-Henseleit solution with oxygen bubbling through in order to keep the tissue alive and metabolically active. The solution is heated, usually via an external heater/cooler water bath, to an appropriate test temperature for the muscle that is being tested. Muscles are stimulated to contract by applying electric current to either the nerve which innervates the muscle or via platinum electrodes placed in the circulating solution to evoke a response of the entire muscle. The servomotor detects changes in force and/or length due to muscle contraction. Stimulation level is often set to the level which ensures maximal motor unit recruitment. The servomotor can be programmed to maintain a given force while allowing the muscle to change length, vice versa, or the muscle may be subject to more complex testing, such as in work loops. When pennate muscles are used, sonomicrometry is often used to accurately determine fiber length during the test.

== Scale ==
In vitro muscle testing can be done on any scale of muscle organization - entire groups of muscles (provided they share a common insertion or origin, as in the human quadriceps), a single muscle, a "bundle" of muscle fibers, a single muscle fiber, a single myofibril, a single sarcomere, a cardiomyocyte or even a half-sarcomere. Muscle fibers may be intact, or may be "skinned", a process which removes the cell membrane, sarcoplasmic reticulum, and cytoplasm, allowing greater access to the contractile components of the sarcomere.

== Typical tests ==
Several properties are commonly tested, and a given experiment will often use a subset of these properties, including twitch times, tetanic force, force-length relationship, force velocity relationship, work loops, fatigue trials, fusion frequency, and energetic cost.

== In situ ==
A hybrid approach between in vitro and in vivo has recently been used, called in situ, in which the organism is put under terminal anesthesia, and in vivo tests are performed with the muscle still attached to the organism. This ensures the muscle is kept at the right temperature and amply supplied with nutrients and oxygen by the blood, but the procedure is more difficult and some tests may not be possible.

== Species ==
In vitro muscle testing is almost never used in humans, with the exception of small sections of muscle removed via biopsy or while undergoing surgery for other ailments. Testing is generally more difficult in mammals and birds because of the high temperature and oxygen requirements of the muscle, leading to rapid cell death once muscle tissue is removed from the organism. Mammalian skeletal muscles are commonly tested at ~25°C to prolong the test protocol for as long as reasonably possible. A test temperature of ~37°C can also been used during testing of whole isolated mammalian skeletal muscles to better replicate the temperature found in in vivo. Moreover, it is important to consider the thermal specialisation of skeletal muscles, with core muscles more susceptible to changes in mechanical performance with small temperature changes than peripheral muscles. In ectotherms (reptiles, amphibians, fish, and invertebrates), the muscle tissue can survive outside of the organism for hours or even days, depending on the temperature and organism. Many experiments are conducted at or near 0°C to prolong the usable life of the muscle. Additionally, in fish and amphibians, it is possible to separate out a single muscle fiber while keeping it intact, but in other species, this is usually not possible.

== Advantages of isolated muscle testing ==
Isolating muscle tissue in vitro allows individual data of muscle cell function without the presence of signaling nonmuscle cells nearby. In vitro testing allows for exact stimulation of the muscle, providing precise data on innate tissue behavior. Isolated muscle testing limits other factors on the environment around the tissue such as substrates. In vitro isolated muscle testing is a beneficial procedure based on its ideal accuracy, precision, and reproducibly.

== See also ==
- Animal testing
- Physiology
- Skeletal muscle
