= Rhizobium leguminosarum =

Scientific classification
- Domain: Bacteria
- Kingdom: Pseudomonadati
- Phylum: Pseudomonadota
- Class: Alphaproteobacteria
- Order: Hyphomicrobiales
- Family: Rhizobiaceae
- Genus: Rhizobium
- Species: R. leguminosarum

Binomial name
- Rhizobium leguminosarum (Frank 1879) Frank 1889 (Approved Lists 1980)

Type strain
- ATCC 10004; LMG 14904 strain 3Hoq18; USDA 2370

Biovars
- symbiovar trifolii; symbiovar viciae

Synonyms
- Rhizobium trifolii Dangeard 1926 (Approved Lists 1980)

Species of bacterium

Rhizobium leguminosarum is a Gram-negative soil bacterium in the genus Rhizobium that forms mutualistic, nitrogen-fixing symbioses with legumes. Compatible strains colonise the roots of various host plants and induce the formation of root nodules, within which the bacteria differentiate into bacteroids and convert atmospheric nitrogen into ammonium compounds that can be used by the plant. In return, the plant supplies the bacteria with carbon compounds.

Different symbiotic groups have characteristic host ranges: strains of symbiovar viciae nodulate legumes including peas, vetches and lentils, whereas symbiovar trifolii is associated with clovers. R. leguminosarum, particularly strains of symbiovar viciae, has been widely used as a model for studying root-nodule formation, bacteroid metabolism and symbiotic nitrogen fixation. Its genome has also been extensively studied, including the complete sequencing of the widely used strain 3841.

== Morphology ==
Rhizobium leguminosarum is a Gram-negative, motile, rod-shaped, aerobic bacterium.

== Common biovars ==
Rhizobium leguminosarum biovar trifolii, and R. leguminosarum biovar viciae are the most commonly studied biovars of R. leguminosarum, with certain studies seemingly treating R. trifolii as its own species.

== Symbiosis and nitrogen fixation ==
The symbiosis between R. leguminosarum and its host plants involves an exchange of chemical signals. Compounds released by legume roots, particularly flavonoids and other phenolic compounds, are detected by rhizobial regulatory proteins such as NodD, which activate bacterial nod genes. These genes direct the production of Nod factors, signalling molecules whose precise chemical structure is an important determinant of host specificity.

In susceptible legumes, Nod-factor signalling causes changes including root hair deformation and curling. The bacteria enter through structures known as infection threads and are delivered into developing root nodules, where they differentiate into bacteroids capable of nitrogen fixation. Within the nodule, the plant supplies the bacteroids with carbon compounds, while the bacteria reduce atmospheric nitrogen to forms that can be assimilated by the plant. Nitrogenase is sensitive to oxygen, although the bacteroids require oxygen for respiration; leghemoglobin produced in the nodule helps maintain a low free-oxygen concentration while delivering oxygen to the bacteroids.

== Genome ==
The extensively studied R. leguminosarum bv. viciae strain 3841 has a genome of approximately 7.75 million base pairs, consisting of a circular chromosome and six circular plasmids. Many genes involved in the symbiosis are carried on plasmids. In strain 3841, the 488-kilobase plasmid pRL10 is the principal symbiotic plasmid and contains clustered nod genes required for nodulation together with nif and fix genes involved in nitrogen fixation.

== Fatty acid synthesis ==
Rhizobium leguminosarum's acyl carrier protein differs from most ACPs by having a C-terminus extension. This ACP is also used in the synthesis of unusually long ACPs which themselves are then used in the synthesis of the R. leguminosarum nod factor.

== Uses ==
R. leguminosarum is widely used in the inoculation of legume seeds. The sv. trifolii strain U204 is commercially used to inoculate white and red clover in particular, but better strains for this purpose are being developed.

Research has been carried out into the role that R. leguminosarum could play in promoting growth of canola and lettuce.
