= Rhizobium indigoferae =

Scientific classification
- Domain: Bacteria
- Kingdom: Pseudomonadati
- Phylum: Pseudomonadota
- Class: Alphaproteobacteria
- Order: Hyphomicrobiales
- Family: Rhizobiaceae
- Genus: Rhizobium
- Species: R. indigoferae

Binomial name
- Rhizobium indigoferae Wei et al. 2002

Species of bacterium

Rhizobium indigoferae is a Gram negative root nodule bacteria, which nodulates and forms nitrogen-fixing symbioses with Indigofera species. Its type strain is CCBAU 71714(T) (= AS 1.3046(T)).
