= Ringer's solution =

Electrolyte solution for use in healthcare

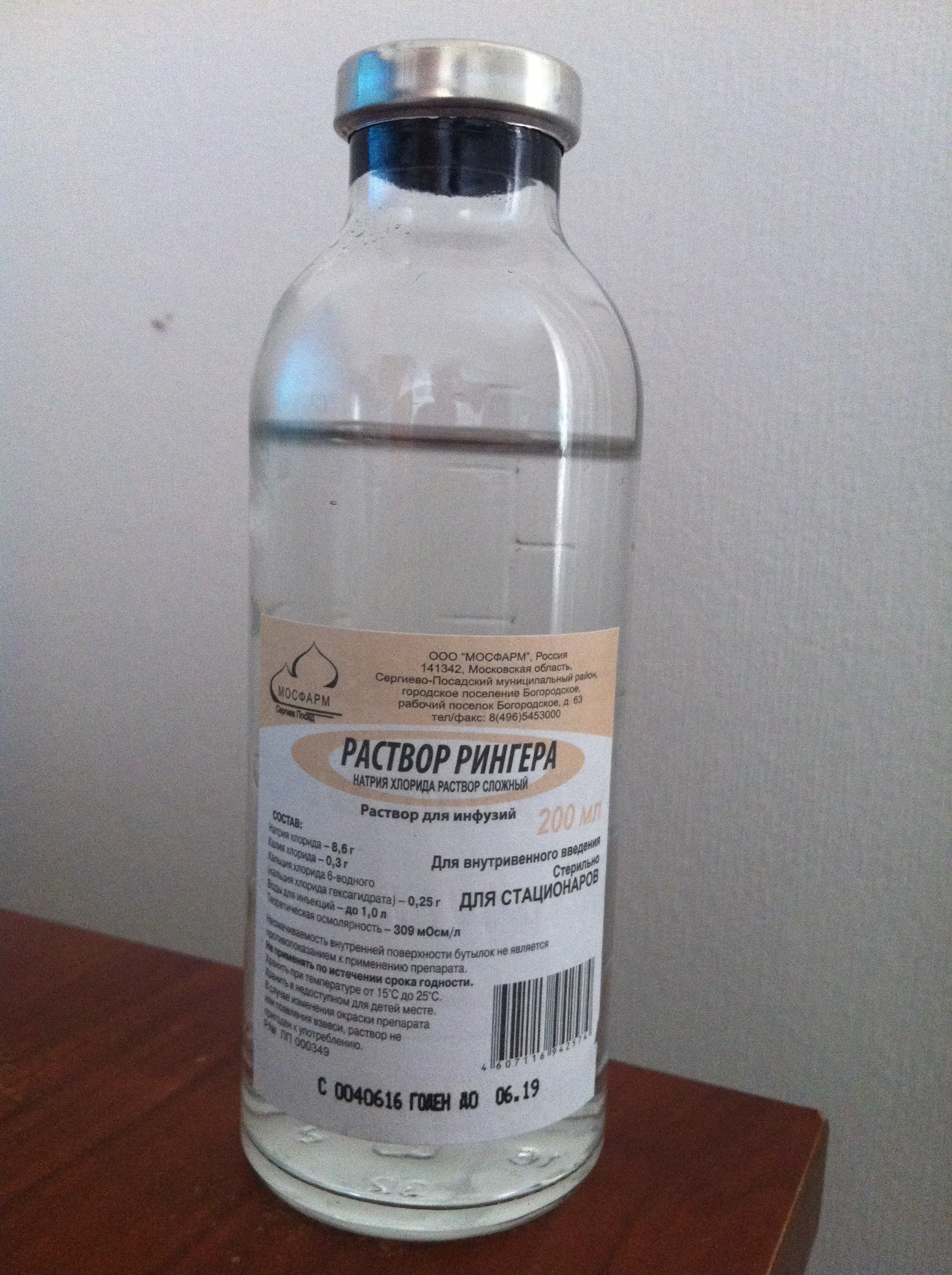
Ringer's solution

Ringer's solution is a solution of several salts dissolved in water for the purpose of creating an isotonic solution relative to the body fluids of an animal. Ringer's solution typically contains sodium chloride, potassium chloride, calcium chloride and sodium bicarbonate, with the last used to buffer the pH. Other additions can include chemical fuel sources for cells, including ATP and dextrose, as well as antibiotics and antifungals.

== Composition ==
Ringer's solution typically contains NaCl, KCl, CaCl_{2} and NaHCO_{3}, sometimes with other minerals such as MgCl_{2}, dissolved in distilled water. The precise proportions of these vary from species to species, particularly between marine osmoconformers and osmoregulators.

== Uses ==
Ringer's solution is frequently administered to human and veterinary patients for intravenous or subcutaneous hydration and to expand the vascular compartment in hypovolemia. It is also use in in vitro experiments on organs or tissues, such as in vitro muscle testing. The precise mix of ions can vary depending upon the taxon, with different recipes for birds, mammals, freshwater fish, marine fish, etc.

Ringers solution may also be used for therapeutic purposes, such as arthroscopic lavage in the case of septic arthritis. It is used clinically as an intravenous infusion for replacing extracellular fluid losses and restoring chemical balances when treating isotonic dehydration.

== History ==
Ringer's solution is named after British clinician, physiologist and pharmacologist Sydney Ringer, who in 1882–1885 determined that a solution perfusing a frog's heart must contain sodium, potassium and calcium salts in a definite proportion if the heart is to be kept beating for long. This solution was adjusted further in the 1930s by Alexis Hartmann, who added sodium lactate to form Ringer's lactate solution.
