= Rhizobium pisi =

Scientific classification
- Domain: Bacteria
- Kingdom: Pseudomonadati
- Phylum: Pseudomonadota
- Class: Alphaproteobacteria
- Order: Hyphomicrobiales
- Family: Rhizobiaceae
- Genus: Rhizobium
- Species: R. pisi

Binomial name
- Rhizobium pisi Ramírez-Bahena et al. 2008

Type strain
- DSM 30132; NCIB 11478; NCIMB 11478

Biovars
- symbiovar trifolii; symbiovar viciae

Species of bacterium

Rhizobium pisi is a root nodule bacterium.
