= Rhizobium gallicum =

Scientific classification
- Domain: Bacteria
- Kingdom: Pseudomonadati
- Phylum: Pseudomonadota
- Class: Alphaproteobacteria
- Order: Hyphomicrobiales
- Family: Rhizobiaceae
- Genus: Rhizobium
- Species: R. gallicum

Binomial name
- Rhizobium gallicum Amarger et al. 1997

Biovars
- symbiovar gallicum; symbiovar orientale; symbiovar phaseoli

Synonyms
- Rhizobium azibense Mnasri et al. 2014

Species of bacterium

Rhizobium gallicum is a Gram-negative root-nodule bacterium. It forms nitrogen-fixing root nodules on legumes, being first isolated from those of Phaseolus vulgaris.
