= Rhizobium viscosum =

Scientific classification
- Domain: Bacteria
- Kingdom: Pseudomonadati
- Phylum: Pseudomonadota
- Class: Alphaproteobacteria
- Order: Hyphomicrobiales
- Family: Rhizobiaceae
- Genus: Rhizobium
- Species: R. viscosum

Binomial name
- Rhizobium viscosum (Gasdorf et al. 1965) Flores-Félix et al. 2017

Type strain LMG 16473 LMG 17310 NCDO 2326 NCFB 2326 NCIMB 9729 NRRL B-1973 PCM 2469
- ATCC 19584; BCRC 14858; CCRC 14858; CDBB 20; CECT 908; CIP 82.105; CIP 82.105T; DSM 7307; DSMZ 7307; IAM 14871; JCM 11566; KCTC 3388 l-23

Synonyms
- Arthrobacter viscosus Gasdorf et al. 1965 (Approved Lists 1980)

Species of bacterium

Rhizobium viscosum is a bacterium species from the genus Rhizobium which has been isolated from soil from the city airport in Guatemala. Rhizobium viscosum produces exopolysaccharide.
