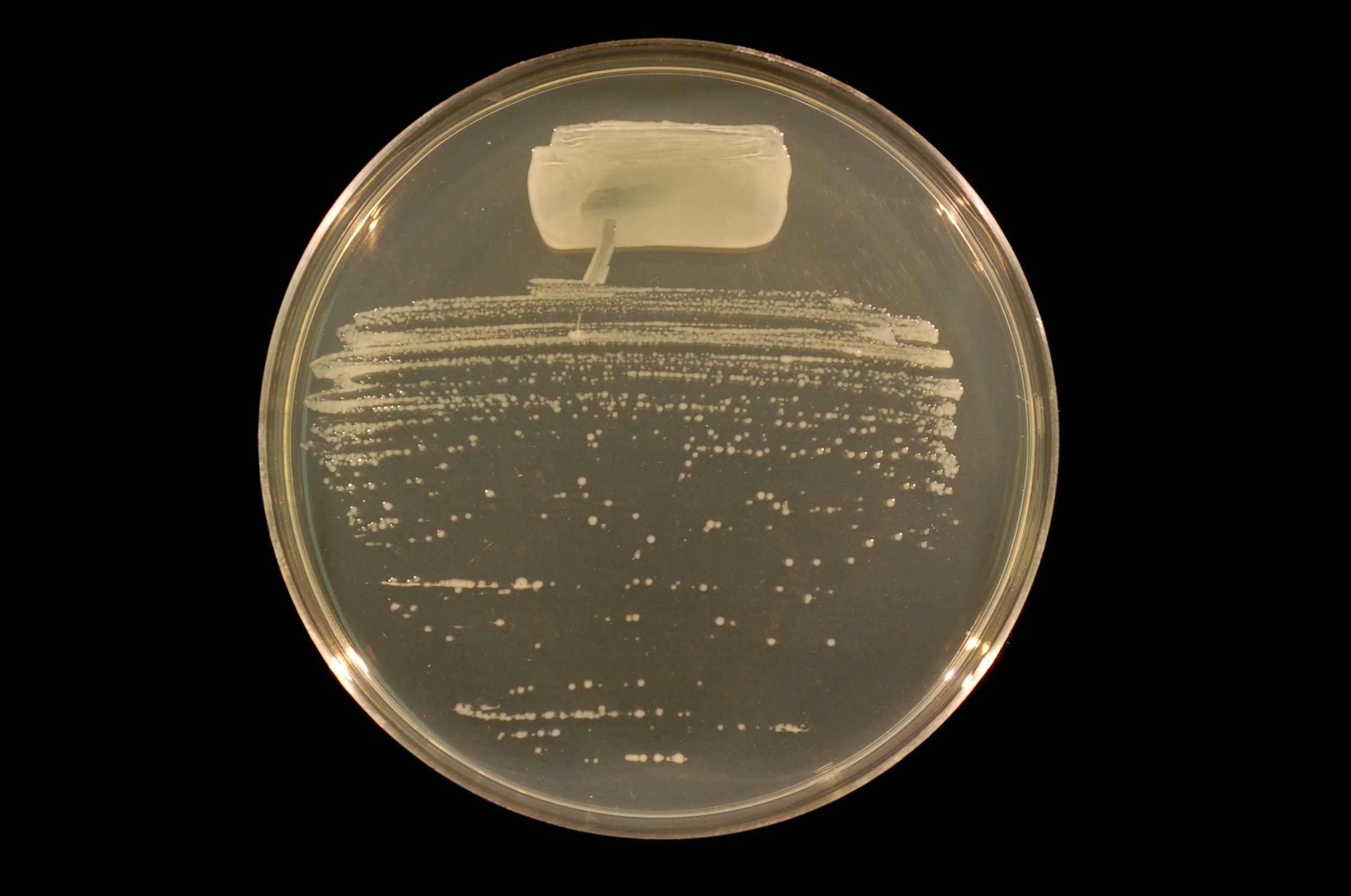
- Rhizobium tropici on an agar plate (Tryptone — Yeast extract agar).

Scientific classification
- Domain: Bacteria
- Kingdom: Pseudomonadati
- Phylum: Pseudomonadota
- Class: Alphaproteobacteria
- Order: Hyphomicrobiales
- Family: Rhizobiaceae
- Genus: Rhizobium; Frank 1889 (Approved Lists 1980)

Type species
- Rhizobium leguminosarum (Frank 1879) Frank 1889 (Approved Lists 1980)

Species
- See text

= Rhizobium =

Genus of nitrogen-fixing bacteria

Rhizobium is a genus of Gram-negative soil bacteria that are aerobic, rod-shaped nitrogen fixers. Rhizobium species form an endosymbiotic nitrogen-fixing association with roots of (primarily) legumes and other flowering plants.

The bacteria colonize plant cells to form root nodules, where they convert atmospheric nitrogen into ammonia using the enzyme nitrogenase. The ammonia is shared with the host plant in the form of organic nitrogenous compounds such as glutamine or ureides. The plant, in turn, provides the bacteria with organic compounds made by photosynthesis. This mutually beneficial relationship is true of all of the rhizobia, of which the genus Rhizobium is a typical example. Rhizobium is also capable of solubilizing phosphate.

== History ==
Martinus Beijerinck was the first to isolate and cultivate a microorganism from the nodules of legumes in 1888. He named it Bacillus radicicola, which is now placed in Bergey's Manual of Determinative Bacteriology under the genus Rhizobium.

== Research ==
Some Rhizobium forms a symbiotic relationship with certain plants, such as legumes, fixing nitrogen from the air into ammonia, which acts as a natural fertilizer for the plants. The Agricultural Research Service is conducting research involving the genetic mapping of various rhizobial species with their respective symbiotic plant species, like alfalfa or soybean. The goal of this research is to increase the plants' productivity without using fertilizers.

Rhizobium rhizogenes is a pathogenic species of Rhizobium that causes hairy root disease by injecting a root-inducing T-DNA into the plants. It produces industrially-useful hairy root cultures as well as genetically modified plants.

In molecular biology, Rhizobium has been identified as a contaminant of DNA extraction kit reagents and ultrapure water systems, which may lead to its erroneous appearance in microbiota or metagenomic datasets. The presence of nitrogen-fixing bacteria as contaminants may be due to the use of nitrogen gas in ultra-pure water production to inhibit microbial growth in storage tanks.

== Species ==
The genus Rhizobium comprises the following species:-

- Rhizobium acidisoli Román-Ponce et al. 2016
- Rhizobium aegyptiacum Shamseldin et al. 2016
- Rhizobium aethiopicum Aserse et al. 2017
- Rhizobium alamii Berge et al. 2009
- "Rhizobium album" Hang et al. 2019
- "Rhizobium albus" Li et al. 2017
- Rhizobium altiplani Baraúna et al. 2016
- Rhizobium alvei Sheu et al. 2015
- Rhizobium anhuiense Zhang et al. 2015
- Rhizobium aquaticum Máthé et al. 2019
- "Rhizobium arachis" Wang et al. 2001
- Rhizobium arenae Zhang et al. 2017 (Note: This species belongs in Pararhizobium, but hasn't been formally transferred, yet.)
- Rhizobium arsenicireducens Mohapatra et al. 2020
- Rhizobium azooxidifex Behrendt et al. 2016
- Rhizobium bangladeshense Rashid et al. 2015
- Rhizobium binae Rashid et al. 2015
- Rhizobium calliandrae Rincón-Rosales et al. 2013
- Rhizobium capsici Lin et al. 2015
- Rhizobium cauense Liu et al. 2015
- Rhizobium cellulosilyticum García-Fraile et al. 2007 (Note: These species belong in Neorhizobium, but haven't been formally transferred, yet.)
- Rhizobium changzhiense Zhang et al. 2021
- Rhizobium chutanense Huo et al. 2019
- "Rhizobium cremeum" Yang et al. 2022
- "Rhizobium croatiense" Rajnovic et al. 2022
- "Rhizobium deserti" Liu et al. 2020
- Rhizobium dioscoreae Ouyabe et al. 2020
- Rhizobium ecuadorense Ribeiro et al. 2015
- Rhizobium endophyticum López-López et al. 2010
- Rhizobium esperanzae Cordeiro et al. 2017
- Rhizobium etli Segovia et al. 1993
- Rhizobium favelukesii Torres Tejerizo et al. 2016
- "Rhizobium flavescens" Su et al. 2021
- Rhizobium freirei Dall'Agnol et al. 2013
- Rhizobium gallicum Amarger et al. 1997
- Rhizobium gei Shi et al. 2016
- "Rhizobium glycinendophyticum" Wang et al. 2020 (Note: This species belongs in Peteryoungia, but hasn't been formally transferred, yet.)
- Rhizobium grahamii López-López et al. 2011
- Rhizobium hainanense Chen et al. 1997
- Rhizobium halophytocola Bibi et al. 2012
- "Rhizobium halotolerans" Diange and Lee 2013
- "Rhizobium hedysari" Casella et al. 1986
- "Rhizobium hedysari" Xu et al. 2017
- "Rhizobium hedysarum" Casella et al. 1984
- Rhizobium helianthi Wei et al. 2015
- Rhizobium hidalgonense Yan et al. 2020
- "Rhizobium indicum" Rahi et al. 2020
- Rhizobium indigoferae Wei et al. 2002
- Rhizobium jaguaris Rincón-Rosales et al. 2013
- "Rhizobium kunmingense" Shen et al. 2010
- Rhizobium laguerreae Saïdi et al. 2014
- Rhizobium leguminosarum (Frank 1879) Frank 1889 (Approved Lists 1980)
- Rhizobium lemnae Kittiwongwattana & Thawai 2014
- Rhizobium lentis Rashid et al. 2015
- Rhizobium leucaenae Ribeiro et al. 2011
- Rhizobium lusitanum Valverde et al. 2006
- "Candidatus Rhizobium massiliense" Greub et al. 2004.
- Rhizobium mayense Rincón-Rosales et al. 2013
- Rhizobium mesoamericanum López-López et al. 2011
- Rhizobium mesosinicum Lin et al. 2009
- Rhizobium metallidurans Grison et al. 2015
- Rhizobium miluonense Gu et al. 2008
- Rhizobium mongolense van Berkum et al. 1998
- Rhizobium multihospitium Han et al. 2008
- Rhizobium oryzicola Zhang et al. 2015
- "Rhizobium oryzihabitans" Zhao et al. 2020
- Rhizobium pakistanense corrig. Khalid et al. 2015
- "Rhizobium panacihumi" Kang et al. 2019
- Rhizobium paranaense Dall'Agnol et al. 2014
- Rhizobium phaseoli Dangeard 1926 (Approved Lists 1980)
- "Rhizobium phenanthrenilyticum" Wen et al. 2011
- Rhizobium pisi Ramírez-Bahena et al. 2008
- "Rhizobium pongamiae" Kesari et al. 2013
- Rhizobium populi Rozahon et al. 2014
- "Rhizobium populisoli" Shen et al. 2021
- Rhizobium puerariae Boonsnongcheep et al. 2016
- "Rhizobium qilianshanense" Xu et al. 2013
- "Rhizobium quercicola" Wang et al. 2022
- "Rhizobium redzepovicii" Rajnovic et al. 2022
- Rhizobium rhizogenes (Riker et al. 1930) Young et al. 2001
- "Rhizobium rhizolycopersici" Thin et al. 2021
- Rhizobium rhizoryzae Zhang et al. 2014
- Rhizobium ruizarguesonis Jorrin et al. 2020
- Rhizobium smilacinae Zhang et al. 2014
- Rhizobium soli Yoon et al. 2010
- Rhizobium sophorae Jiao et al. 2014
- Rhizobium sophoriradicis Jiao et al. 2014
- Rhizobium straminoryzae Lin et al. 2014
- Rhizobium sullae Squartini et al. 2002
- "Rhizobium terrae" Ruan et al. 2020
- Rhizobium tibeticum Hou et al. 2009
- Rhizobium tropici Martínez-Romero et al. 1991
- Rhizobium tubonense Zhang et al. 2011
- Rhizobium tumorigenes Kuzmanović et al. 2019
- Rhizobium vallis Wang et al. 2011
- Rhizobium viscosum (Gasdorf et al. 1965) Flores-Félix et al. 2017
- Rhizobium wenxiniae Gao et al. 2017
- Rhizobium yanglingense Tan et al. 2001
- Rhizobium zeae Celador-Lera et al. 2017

Species in "double quotes" have been described, but not validated according to the Bacteriological Code.

== Phylogeny ==
The currently accepted taxonomy is based on the List of Prokaryotic names with Standing in Nomenclature (LPSN). The phylogeny is based on whole-genome analysis.

- - Rhizobium
    - - Rhizobium tubonense
      - - Rhizobium rhizogenes
        - - - Rhizobium jaguaris
            - Rhizobium leucaenae
          - - Rhizobium lusitanum
            - - - Rhizobium miluonense
                - Rhizobium freirei
              - - Rhizobium tropici
                - - Rhizobium hainanense
                  - Rhizobium multihospitium
    - - - - Rhizobium altiplani
          - Rhizobium grahamii
        - - Rhizobium favelukesii
          - Rhizobium tibeticum
      - - - Rhizobium loessense
          - Rhizobium mongolense
        - - - Rhizobium leguminosarum
            - Rhizobium laguerreae
          - - Rhizobium aethiopicum
            - - Rhizobium esperanzae
              - Rhizobium etli
  - outgroups
    - - Allorhizobium
      - Ciceribacter
    - - Agrobacterium
      - - Pseudorhizobium
        - Neorhizobium
