= William Arthur Johnson (biochemist) =

British biochemist and co-discoverer of the Krebs cycle

William Arthur Johnson was a British biochemist. He was best known as the co-discoverer of the Krebs cycle along with his supervisor Hans Krebs.

== Early life and education ==
Johnson was born in Stockton-on-Tees, England in 1913. He studied chemistry at the University of Sheffield, receiving a first-class honours degree. Following a period of teacher training, Johnson was accepted as a postgraduate student of Krebs in the Department of Pharmacology at Sheffield in 1935.

== Work on the Krebs cycle ==
Krebs taught Johnson the relevant manometry techniques at Sheffield, which Krebs himself had learnt in Otto Heinrich Warburg's laboratory at the Kaiser Wilhelm Institute for Biology in Berlin.

The research in the laboratory at Sheffield involved long hours of repetitive work where manometry was used to determine the oxygen consumption of tissue slices of pigeon breast muscle. The majority of data relevant to the Krebs cycle findings were collected by Johnson, whereas Krebs provided the overall direction and intellectual stimulus for the research, according to an interview conducted with Johnson in 1993.

Krebs and Johnson attempted to publish their findings in Nature in 1937, but the journal rejected their submission due to already having a backlog of accepted submissions, meaning that the journal was at capacity for several weeks to come. Instead they chose to publish their paper The role of citric acid in intermediate metabolism in animal tissues in the Dutch journal Enzymologia.

Johnson's PhD thesis, completed in 1938, was based on his work with Krebs and was titled Studies in the Intermediate Metabolism of Carbohydrates. His thesis included an early schematic diagram of the Krebs cycle.

== Career after PhD ==
After gaining his PhD from Sheffield, Johnson worked for British Drug Houses where he became assistant works manager. After the Second World War he moved to Liverpool where he was employed as a manager of a chemical plant that was acquired by Commonwealth Zinc, ultimately becoming part of Rio Tinto. While there he progressed to eventually become a member of the company's UK board. He retired in London.

== Professional relationship with Krebs ==
Krebs described Johnson as 'a particularly conscientious, reliable, skilful and steady worker who has also shown independence of thought and sound criticism'.

After Johnson left Sheffield, he and Krebs neither saw each other nor corresponded for roughly 50 years. They next met in Dallas in 1980 at an event honouring the career of Krebs where Johnson had been asked to speak.

In his speech Johnson reflected on his time working with Krebs and concluded his remarks by saying:

'People often ask "What has biochemistry done for me?" My reply would be that it gave me, at an early and impressionable age, the opportunity of working with one of the world's finest minds, to see the speed at which he reached conclusions, to try – and I say this advisedly – to try and understand his thought processes and it gave me a yardstick to measure in other people that I have met in later years. Throughout my years I have occasionally been asked (and it happened about six months ago) "Didn't you once work with Krebs?" and I smile a superior smile and say, "Yes, I did." That was what biochemistry did for me, and for that, Sir Hans, I thank you.'
