= Rhizobium hainanense =

Scientific classification
- Domain: Bacteria
- Kingdom: Pseudomonadati
- Phylum: Pseudomonadota
- Class: Alphaproteobacteria
- Order: Hyphomicrobiales
- Family: Rhizobiaceae
- Genus: Rhizobium
- Species: R. hainanense

Binomial name
- Rhizobium hainanense Chen et al. 1997

Species of bacterium

Rhizobium hainanense is a Gram negative root nodule bacteria. Strain CCBAU 57015 (166) is the type strain.
