= Tyrode's solution =

Tyrode's solution is a solution that is roughly isotonic with interstitial fluid and used in physiological experiments and tissue culture. It resembles lactated Ringer's solution, but contains magnesium, a sugar (usually glucose) as an energy source and uses bicarbonate and phosphate as a buffer instead of lactate. Some variations also include phosphate and sulfate ions. It must be gassed with 95% oxygen and N2, 5% carbon dioxide when used for cell culture applications and physiology experiments in order to achieve an appropriate pH. With the addition of extra potassium salt, it can be used to prepare a cardioplegic solution.

== Development ==
Tyrode's solution was invented by Maurice Vejux Tyrode (1878–1930), an American pharmacologist. The solution was a modification of Ringer-Locke's solution.

== Therapy ==
Tyrode's solution is often used for irrigation of the peritoneum. It was also recommended by at least one physician as a dietary supplement, because of its inorganic salt content, as part of a medically-prescribed weight loss diet (minus the sugar content).

== Composition ==
Substance	Concentration (g/L)	Molar concentration
NaCl	8.00	134 mM
KCl	0.20	2.68 mM
CaCl_{2}	0.20	1.80 mM
MgCl_{2}	0.10	1.05 mM
NaH_{2}PO_{4}	0.05	417 μM
NaHCO_{3}	1.00	11.9 mM
Glucose	1.00	5.56 mM
pH 6.5		

== See also ==
- Lactated Ringer's solution
