= Rhizobium lusitanum =

Scientific classification
- Domain: Bacteria
- Kingdom: Pseudomonadati
- Phylum: Pseudomonadota
- Class: Alphaproteobacteria
- Order: Hyphomicrobiales
- Family: Rhizobiaceae
- Genus: Rhizobium
- Species: R. lusitanum

Binomial name
- Rhizobium lusitanum Valverde et al. 2006

Species of bacterium

Rhizobium lusitanum is a Gram negative root nodule bacteria, specifically nodulating Phaseolus vulgaris. Its type strain is P1-7^{T} (=LMG 22705^{T} =CECT 7016^{T}).
