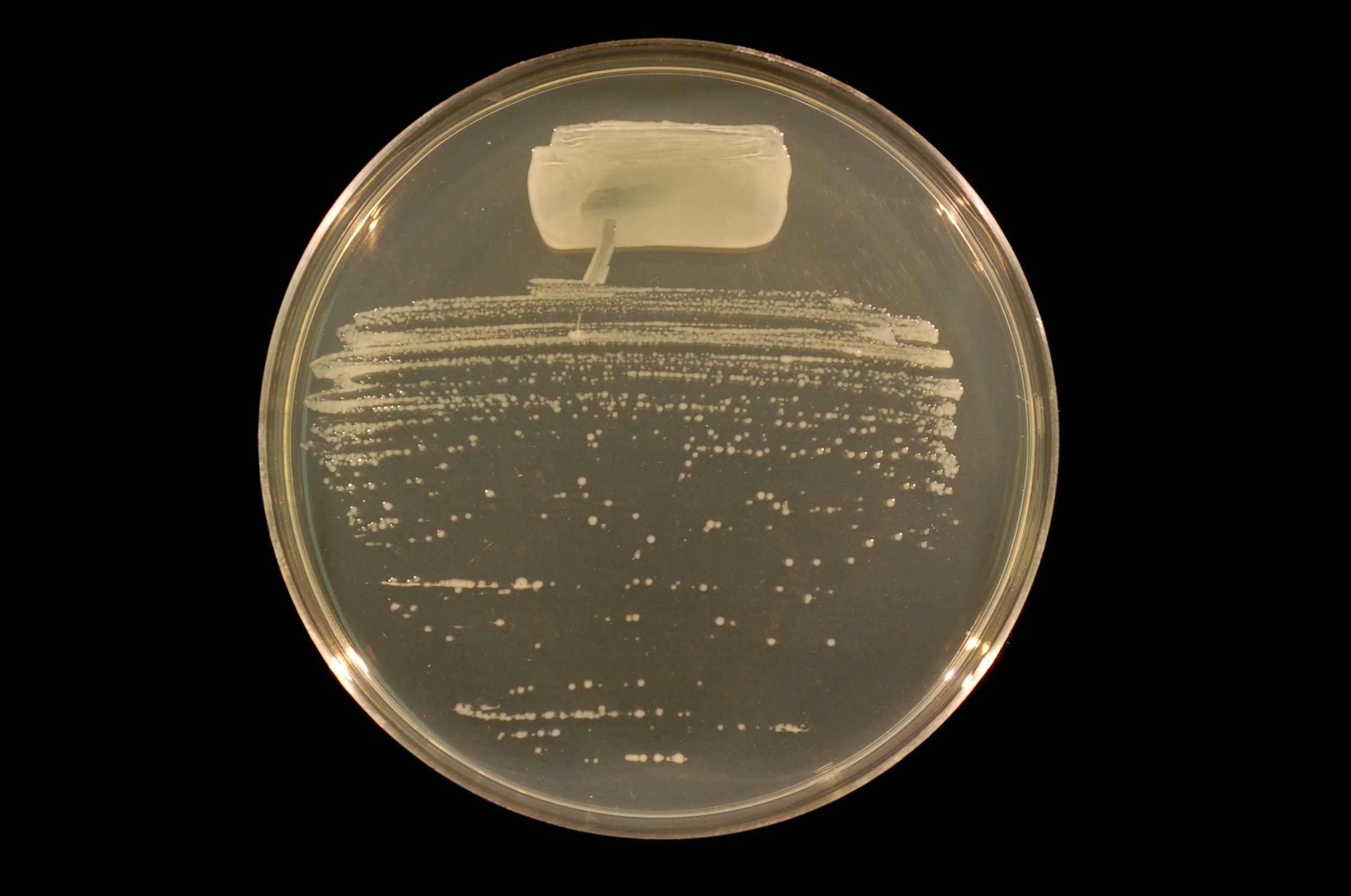

Scientific classification
- Domain: Bacteria
- Kingdom: Pseudomonadati
- Phylum: Pseudomonadota
- Class: Alphaproteobacteria
- Order: Hyphomicrobiales
- Family: Rhizobiaceae
- Genus: Rhizobium
- Species: R. tropici

Binomial name
- Rhizobium tropici Martínez-Romero et al. 1991

Type strain
- ATCC 49672; CIAT 899; DSM 11418; HAMBI 1163; IFO 15247; JCM 21072; LMG 9503; NBRC 15247

= Rhizobium tropici =

Species of bacterium

Rhizobium tropici is a root nodule bacterium.
