= Hans Krebs (biochemist) =

British biochemist (1900–1981)

Sir Hans Krebs FRS
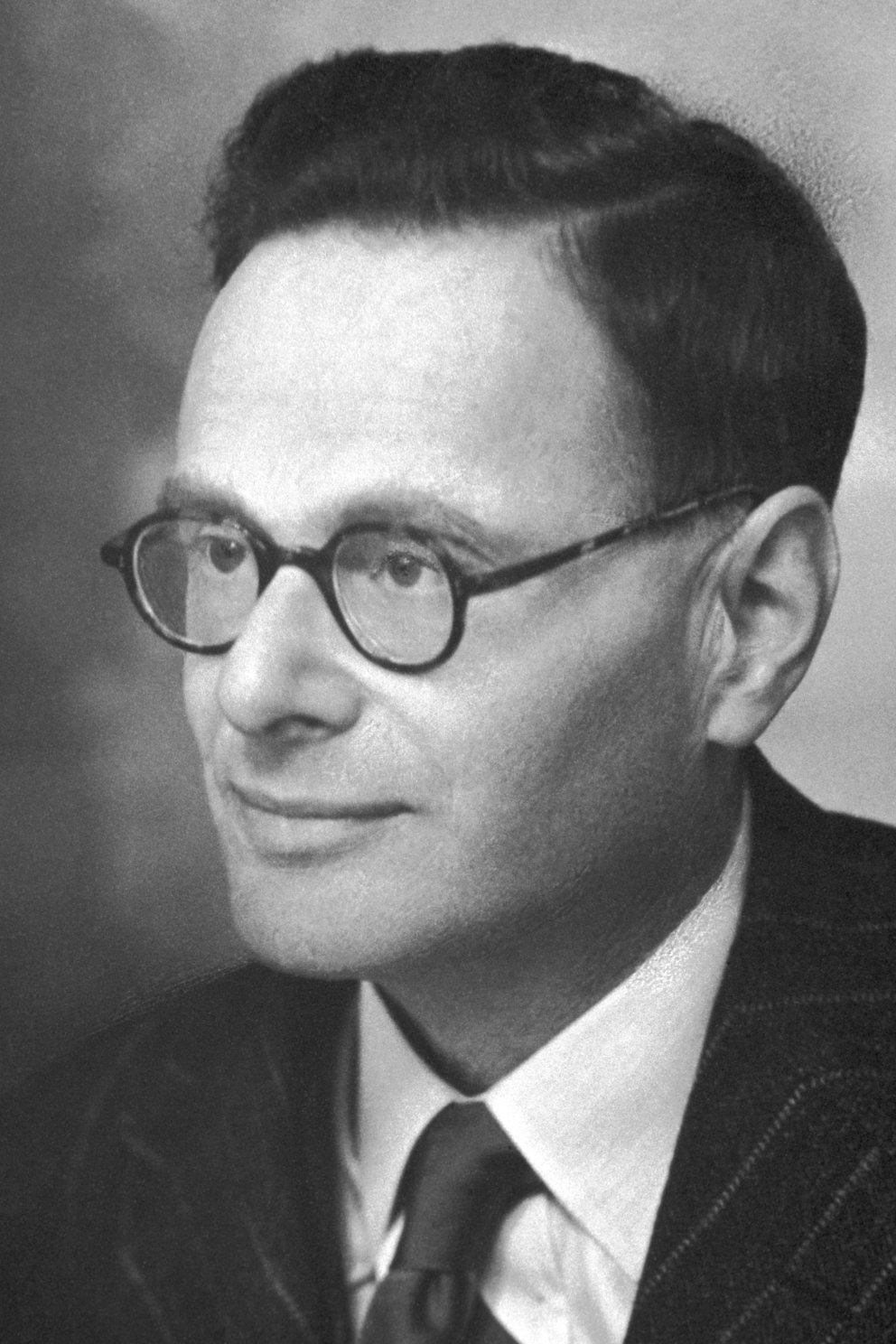
- Born: 25 August 1900; Hildesheim, Province of Hanover, Kingdom of Prussia, German Empire
- Died: 22 November 1981 (aged 81); Oxford, UK
- Citizenship: Naturalised British (from 1939)
- Education: University of Göttingen; University of Freiburg; University of Berlin; University of Hamburg
- Known for: Citric acid cycle Urea cycle Glyoxylate cycle Krebs–Henseleit solution
- Spouse: Margaret Cicely Fieldhouse (m. 1938)
- Children: 3, including John Krebs
- Awards: Albert Lasker Award for Basic Medical Research (1953); Nobel Prize in Physiology or Medicine (1953); Royal Medal (1954); Copley Medal (1961)
- Scientific career
- Fields: Internal medicine, biochemistry
- Workplaces: Kaiser Wilhelm Institute for Biology; University of Hamburg; University of Cambridge; University of Sheffield; University of Oxford

Sir Hans Adolf Krebs, FRS (/krɛbz, krɛps/, German: [hans ˈʔaːdɔlf ˈkʁeːps]; 25 August 1900 – 22 November 1981) was a German-British biologist, physician and biochemist. He was a pioneer scientist in the study of cellular respiration, a biochemical process in living cells that extracts energy from food and oxygen and makes it available to drive the processes of life. He is best known for his discoveries of two important sequences of chemical reactions that take place in the cells of nearly all organisms, including humans, other than anaerobic microorganisms, namely the citric acid cycle and the urea cycle. The former, often eponymously known as the "Krebs cycle", is the sequence of metabolic reactions that allows cells of oxygen-respiring organisms to obtain far more ATP from the food they consume than anaerobic processes such as glycolysis can supply; and its discovery earned Krebs a Nobel Prize in Physiology or Medicine in 1953. With Hans Kornberg, he also discovered the glyoxylate cycle, a slight variation of the citric acid cycle found in plants, bacteria, protists, and fungi.

Krebs died in 1981 in Oxford, where he had spent 13 years of his career from 1954 until his retirement in 1967 at the University of Oxford.

== Biography ==
=== Early life and education ===
Krebs was born in Hildesheim, Germany, to Georg Krebs, an ear, nose, and throat surgeon, and Alma Krebs (née Davidson). He was of Jewish ancestry and was the middle of three children. He had an elder sister, Elisabeth, and a younger brother, Wolfgang.

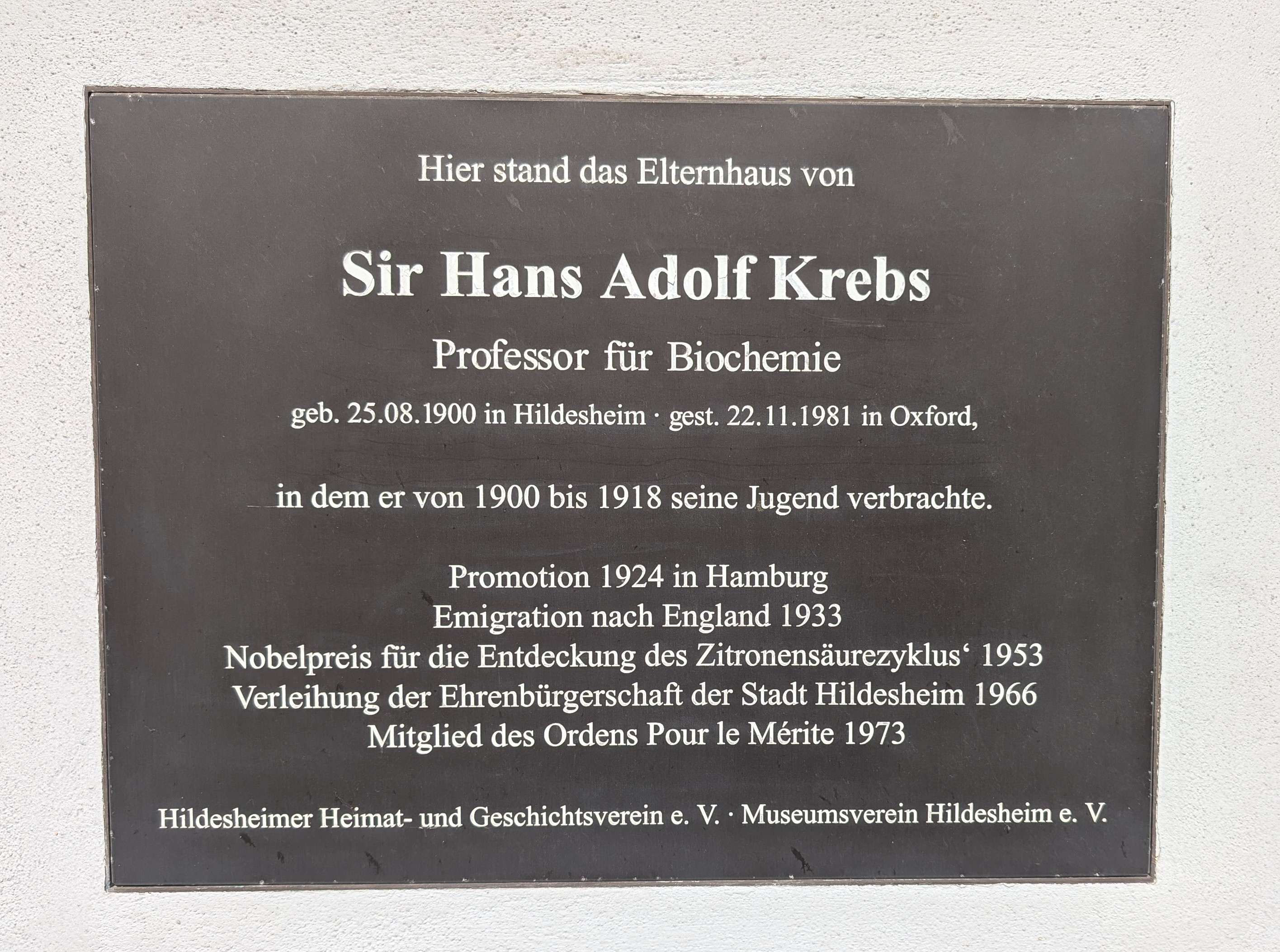
Memorial plaque at the parental home of Sir Hans Adolf Krebs in Hildesheim

Krebs attended school at the Gymnasium Andreanum in his home town. Near the end of World War I, in September 1918, six months short of completing his secondary school education, he was conscripted into the Imperial German Army. He was allowed to take an emergency examination for his high school diploma, which he passed with such a high score that he suspected the examiners of being "unduly lenient and sympathetic". With the end of the war two months later, his conscription ended.

Krebs decided to follow his father's profession and entered the University of Göttingen in December 1918 to study medicine. In 1919, he transferred to the University of Freiburg. In 1923, he published his first scientific paper on a tissue staining technique. He did this work under the guidance of Wilhelm von Mollendorf starting it in 1920. He completed his medical course in December 1923. To obtain a Doctor of Medicine degree, and a medical license, he spent one year at the Third Medical Clinic in the University of Berlin. By then he had turned his professional goal from becoming a practising physician to becoming a medical researcher, particularly in biochemistry. In 1924, he studied at the Department of Chemistry at the Pathological Institute of the Charité Hospital, in Berlin, for training in chemistry and biochemistry. He earned his MD degree in 1925 from the University of Hamburg.

=== Career ===
In 1926, Krebs joined Otto Heinrich Warburg as a research assistant at the Kaiser Wilhelm Institute for Biology in Dahlem, Berlin. He was paid 4800 marks per year. After four years in 1930, with 16 publications to his credit, his mentor Warburg urged him to move on and he took up the position of Assistant in the Department of Medicine at the Municipal Hospital in Altona (now part of Hamburg). The next year he moved to the Medical Clinic of the University of Freiburg. At Freiburg, he was in charge of about 40 patients, and was at liberty to do his own research. Before a year was over at Freiburg, he, with research student Kurt Henseleit, published their discovery of the ornithine cycle of urea synthesis, which is the metabolic pathway for urea formation. It is now known as the urea cycle, and is sometimes also referred to as the Krebs–Henseleit cycle. Together they also developed a complex aqueous solution (a buffer), or perfusion ex vivo, for studying blood flow in arteries, which is now called the Krebs–Henseleit buffer.) In 1932, he published the basic chemical reactions of the urea cycle, which established his scientific reputation.

Krebs's life as a respected German scientist came to an abrupt halt in 1933 because of his Jewish ancestry. With the rise of Hitler's Nazi Party to power, Germany decreed the Law for the Restoration of the Professional Civil Service, which decreed the removal of all non-Germans, and anti-Nazis, from professional occupations. Krebs received his official dismissal from his job in April 1933, and his service was terminated on 1 July 1933. An admirer, Sir Frederick Gowland Hopkins at the University of Cambridge, immediately came to his rescue, and persuaded the university to recruit Krebs to work with him in the Department of Biochemistry. By July 1933, he was settled in Cambridge with financial support from the Rockefeller Foundation.

Although Germany restricted him to bringing only his personal belongings, he was fortunate that the government agents allowed him to take his equipment and research samples to England. They proved to be pivotal to his later discoveries, especially the manometer developed by Warburg specifically for the measurement of oxygen consumption in thin slices of tissues; it was the basis for his research.

He was appointed as Demonstrator in biochemistry in 1934, and in 1935 the University of Sheffield offered him a post of Lecturer in Pharmacology, with a more spacious laboratory and double the salary. He worked there for 19 years. The University of Sheffield opened a Department of Biochemistry, now Department of Molecular Biology and Biotechnology, in 1938 and Krebs became its first Head, and eventually a Professor in 1945. During his time it became one of the leading departments of biochemistry in the world. Krebs took over the running of the Sorby Research Institute in 1943. In 1944, the British Medical Research Council established the MRC Unit for Cell Metabolism Research at Sheffield, and Krebs was appointed the Director. With this, his laboratory became so large that the locals jokingly nicknamed it "Krebs's Empire".

He moved with his MRC unit to the University of Oxford in 1954 as Whitley Professor of Biochemistry, the post he held until his retirement in 1967. The editorial board of Biochemical Journal extended their good wishes on his retirement, but in return he promised to keep them busy, by producing scientific papers. He continued his research, and took his MRC unit to the Nuffield Department of Clinical Medicine at the Radcliffe Infirmary, Oxford. From there he published over 100 research papers.

== Personal life ==
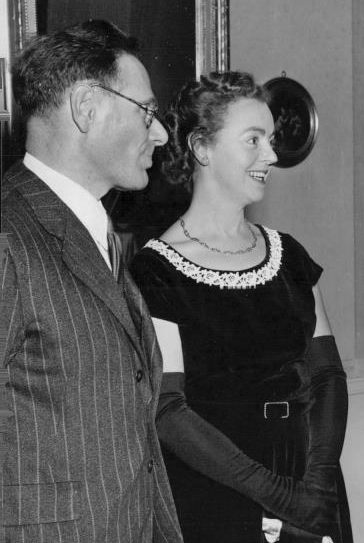
Krebs with his wife in Stockholm in 1953

Krebs met Margaret Cicely Fieldhouse when he moved to Sheffield in 1935. They married on 22 March 1938. Krebs later described his life in Sheffield as "19 happy years". They had two sons, Paul (born 1939) and John (born 1945), and a daughter, Helen (born 1942). John (Sir John Krebs, and later Baron Krebs) became a renowned ornithologist, Professor at the University of Oxford, Principal of Jesus College, Oxford, and Member of the British House of Lords.

== Death ==
After a brief illness, Krebs died on 22 November, 1981 in Oxford, aged 81.

== Achievements ==
=== Urea cycle (Krebs–Henseleit cycle) ===
In 1932, Krebs worked out the outlines of the urea cycle with a medical student Kurt Henseleit at the University of Freiburg. While working at the Medical Clinic of the University of Freiburg, Krebs met Kurt Henseleit, with whom he investigated the chemical process of urea formation. In 1904, two Germans, A. Kossel and H. D. Dakin, had shown that arginine could be hydrolysed by the enzyme arginase to form ornithine and urea in inorganic reaction. Based on this reaction, Krebs and Henseleit postulated that in living cells, similar reaction could occur, and that ornithine and citrulline could be the intermediate reactions. Krebs started working on the possible method for the synthesis of arginine. Using his Warburg manometer, he mixed a slice of liver with purified ornithine and citrulline. He found that citrulline acted as a catalyst in the metabolic reactions of urea from ammonia and carbon dioxide. He and Henseleit published their discovery in 1932. Thus the urea cycle (or "ornithine cycle") was established, and it was the first metabolic cycle to be discovered.

=== Citric acid cycle (Krebs cycle) ===
At the University of Sheffield, Krebs and William Arthur Johnson investigated cellular respiration by which oxygen was consumed to transfer energy from the breakdown of glucose. Krebs had earlier suggested to Warburg while they worked together in Germany that by using a manometer it could be possible to detect the oxygen consumption and identify the chemical reaction in glucose metabolism. Warburg had flatly rejected the idea. In Sheffield, Krebs vigorously worked to identify a possible chemical reaction and came up with numerous hypothetical pathways. Using the manometer he tested those hypotheses one by one. One hypothesis involving succinate, fumarate, and malate proved to be useful because all these molecules increased oxygen consumption in the pigeon breast muscle. In 1937, German biochemists Franz Knoop and Carl Martinus had demonstrated a series of reactions using citrate that produced oxaloacetate. Krebs realised that these molecules could be the missing intermediates for such reaction. After four months of experimental works to fill in the gaps, Krebs and Johnson succeeded in establishing the sequence of the chemical cycle, which they called the "citric acid cycle". It is also known as the "Krebs cycle" or "tricarboxylic acid (TCA) cycle".

Krebs sent a short manuscript account of the discovery to Nature on 10 June 1937. On 14 June, he received a rejection letter from the editor, saying that the journal had "already sufficient letters to fill correspondence columns for seven or eight weeks", and encouraging Krebs to "submit it for early publication to another periodical."

Krebs immediately prepared a longer version titled "The Role of Citric Acid in Intermediate Metabolism in Animal Tissues", which he sent to the Dutch journal Enzymologia after two weeks and was published in two months. It was followed by a series of papers in different journals.

=== Glyoxylate cycle ===
Krebs continued to add more details to his citric acid cycle. The discovery of acetyl-CoA in 1947 by Fritz Albert Lipmann was another major contribution. However, this new discovery posed a problem in his classic reaction. In 1957, he, with Hans Kornberg, found that there were additional crucial enzymes. One was malate synthase, which condenses acetate with glyoxylate to form malate, and the other was isocitrate lyase, which provides glyoxylate for the reaction by cleaving it from isocitrate. These two reactions did not follow the normal citric acid cycle, and hence the pathway was named the glyoxylate bypass of the citric acid cycle, but is now known as the glyoxylate cycle.

== Honours and awards ==
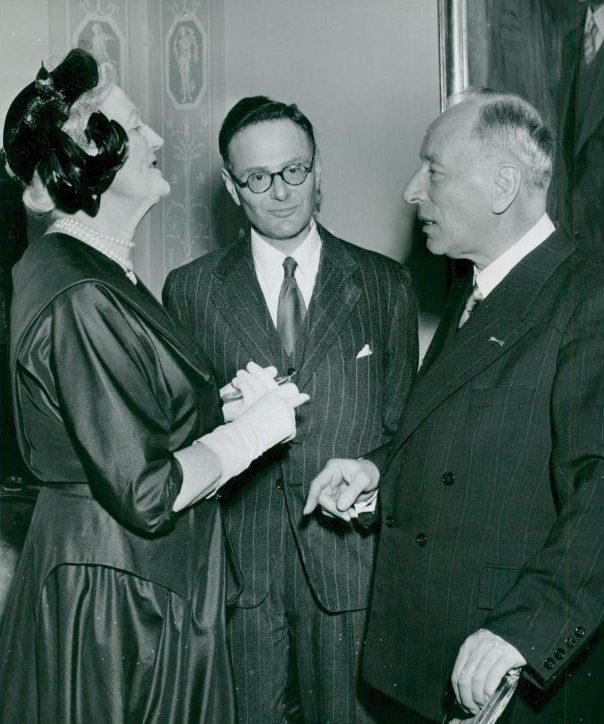
Krebs with Clementine Churchill and Frits Zernike in Stockholm in 1953

Krebs became a naturalised British citizen in 1939. He was elected Fellow of Trinity College, Oxford, 1954–1967. He was elected to the Royal Society in 1947. In 1953, he received the Nobel Prize in Physiology or Medicine for his "discovery of the citric acid cycle." (He shared the Nobel Prize with Fritz Lipmann.) For the same reason he was given the Albert Lasker Award for Basic Medical Research in 1953.

The Royal Society awarded him its Royal Medal in 1954, and Copley Medal in 1961. He was elected to the American Academy of Arts and Sciences in 1957.

In 1958, he received the Gold Medal of the Netherlands Society for Physics, Medical Science and Surgery. He was knighted in 1958 and was elected Honorary Fellow of Girton College, Cambridge University, in 1979. He was the Original Member of the Society for General Microbiology, which conferred him Honorary Membership in 1980. He was also an elected member of both the American Philosophical Society and the United States National Academy of Sciences. He received an honorary doctorate from 21 universities.

In July 2015, Krebs's Nobel Prize medal was auctioned off for £225,000 (around $351,225). The proceeds were used to found the Sir Hans Krebs Trust, which provides funding for doctoral students in the biomedical field and support chemists who had to flee their home countries.

== Legacy ==
The University of Oxford had a building named Hans Krebs Tower, which was occupied by the Department of Biochemistry. In 2008, a new building for the Department of Biochemistry was constructed, on which a plaque was placed on 20 May 2013 by the Association of Jewish Refugees. The plaque was unveiled by John, Lord Krebs, and the inscription reads:

Professor Sir Hans Krebs FRS 1900 – 1981 Biochemist & discoverer of the Krebs cycle Nobel Prize Winner 1953 worked here 1954 – 1967

The Department of Physiology, Anatomy and Genetics at Oxford University hosts the Sir Hans Krebs Prize Lecture Series. The last three recipients have been: Jeffrey Friedman M.D., PhD (2019) Professor Sir Stephen O'Rahilly MD FRS FMedSci (2022) and in 2023 - Professor Dame Frances Ashcroft FRS FMedSci

The University of Sheffield has The Krebs Institute, founded in 1988. It is a research centre covering interdisciplinary programmes in biochemical research.

In 1990, the Federation of European Biochemical Societies instituted the Sir Hans Krebs Lecture and Medal, which was endowed by the Lord Rank Centre for Research. It is awarded for outstanding achievements in biochemistry and molecular biology.

The Society of Friends of Hannover Medical School gives the Sir Hans Krebs Prize, which is worth 10,000 euros.

The Biochemical Society offers Krebs Memorial Scholarship to a postgraduate (PhD) student working in biochemistry or an allied biomedical science at any British university. As of 2014, the scholarship is worth £18,500 and is given for a year, but is extendable up to three years.

== Bibliography ==
- Medawar, Jean; Pyke, David (2012). Hitler's Gift: The True Story of the Scientists Expelled by the Nazi Regime (Paperback). New York: Arcade Publishing. ISBN 978-1-61145-709-4.
- Oakes, Elizabeth H (2007). Encyclopedia of World Scientists (Rev. ed.). New York: Facts on File. p. 414. ISBN 978-1-4381-1882-6.
- Holmes, Frederic Lawrence (1991). Hans Krebs : Volume 1: The Formation of a Scientific Life, 1900–1933. New York: Oxford University Press. p. 512. ISBN 978-0-195-07072-9.
