= Franz Knoop =

German biochemist (1875–1946)

- Born: September 20, 1875; Shanghai, China
- Died: August 2, 1946 (aged 70); Tübingen, Germany
- Scientific career
- Fields: biochemistry

Georg Franz Knoop (20 September 1875 in Shanghai – 2 August 1946 in Tübingen) was a German biochemist, most well known for his discovery of the β-oxidation of the fatty acids in 1905.

Knoop was born in Shanghai where his father the Hamburg merchant Heinrich lived with his wife Katharina. He went to study at the “Gelehrtenschule” Johanneum in Hamburg before going to the universities of Freiburg, Kiel and Berlin. He received a medical degree in 1900 and habilitated from the Karl Ludgwigs University in Freiburg in 1904. He worked at the University of Freiburg from 1909. He visited the Rockefeller Institute in New York in 1913 and then worked at the University of Leipzig (1920), Leiden (1926) and then at Tübingen (1928) where he became a full professor of physiological chemistry. Alongside Hans Adolf Krebs, William Arthur Johnson and Carl Martius, he clarified the reaction sequence of the citric acid cycle in 1937. He determined the structure of histidine and demonstrated that amino acids can be synthesized not only in plants, but also in animals. Knoop married Elisabeth Schottelius in 1908.

Knoop studied the degradation path of fatty acids in animals. He fed odd and even chain ω-phenyl fatty acids such as ω-phenylvaleric acid and ω-phenylbutyric acid to dogs and noted that those that fed on even chain fatty acids excreted phenaceturic acid in their urine while those with odd chain fatty acids excreted hippuric acid. Based on this he postulated that oxidation took place on the β carbon atom.

Knoop published the journal for physiological chemistry and was a co-founder of the German Physiological-Chemistry Society.
