= Rhizobium mongolense =

Scientific classification
- Domain: Bacteria
- Kingdom: Pseudomonadati
- Phylum: Pseudomonadota
- Class: Alphaproteobacteria
- Order: Hyphomicrobiales
- Family: Rhizobiaceae
- Genus: Rhizobium
- Species: R. mongolense

Binomial name
- Rhizobium mongolense Van Berkum et al. 1998

Synonyms
- Rhizobium loessense Wei et al. 2003

Species of bacterium

Rhizobium mongolense is a Gram negative root nodule bacteria, which nodulates and forms nitrogen-fixing symbioses with Medicago ruthenica. Its type strain is USDA 1844.
