= Rhizobium phaseoli =

Scientific classification
- Domain: Bacteria
- Kingdom: Pseudomonadati
- Phylum: Pseudomonadota
- Class: Alphaproteobacteria
- Order: Hyphomicrobiales
- Family: Rhizobiaceae
- Genus: Rhizobium
- Species: R. phaseoli

Binomial name
- Rhizobium phaseoli Dangeard 1926 (Approved Lists 1980)

Type strain
- ATCC 14482; DSM 30137; IFO 14785; JCM 20683; NBRC 14785; NRRL L-321; VKM B-1966

Species of bacterium

Rhizobium phaseoli is a root nodule bacterium.
