= Kurt Henseleit =

- Born: 1907
- Died: 1973 (aged 64–65)
- Known for: Urea cycle Krebs–Henseleit solution

Kurt Henseleit (1907–1973) studied medicine in Berlin, where he was born, with final exams 1929 and was beginning in the winter semester 1930/31 a graduate student of and assistant to Hans Krebs in Freiburg im Breisgau, where he got his M.D. Between them they discovered the urea cycle (known also as the Krebs-Henseleit cycle), and developed the Krebs-Henseleit solution.

Later in life he was a physician (Facharzt) in Friedrichshafen.
