= Krebs–Henseleit solution =

Krebs–Henseleit solution, developed by Hans Krebs and Kurt Henseleit, is a solution containing sodium (Na), potassium (K), chloride (Cl), calcium (Ca), magnesium sulfate (MgSO_{4}), bicarbonate (HCO_{3}), phosphate (PO_{4}), glucose, and sometimes supplemented with albumin, and tromethamine (THAM).

It has been used experimentally, for instance to study arteries ex vivo, in Langendorff heart preparations, and during isolated muscle testing of mammalian skeletal muscles.
