= Bacteroid =

Bacteroid may refer to:

- Bacteroides, a genus of Gram-negative, rod-shaped bacteria
- Bacteroid a differentiated symbiotic form of the nitrogen-fixing bacteria Rhizobia
