= Sonomicrometry =

Measurement of small distances using acoustic signals

Sonomicrometry is a technique of measuring the distance between piezoelectric crystals based on the speed of acoustic signals through the medium they are embedded in. Typically, the crystals will be coated with an epoxy 'lens' and placed into the material facing each other. An electrical signal sent to either crystal will be transformed into sound, which passes through the medium, eventually reaching the other crystal, which converts the sound into electricity, detected by a receiver. From the time taken for sound to move between the crystals and the speed of sound in the medium, the distance between the crystals can be calculated.

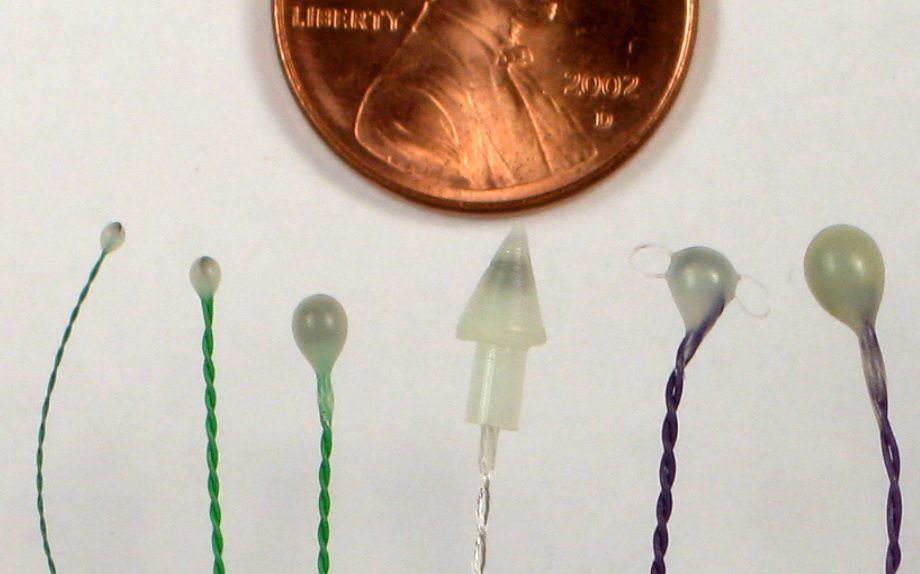
Assortment of sonomicrometer crystals

== History ==
Sonomicrometry was originally applied in the study of cardiac function in research animals by Dean Franklin in 1956, and was quickly adopted by biologists working in biomechanics as well as other physiological organ systems and structures (gastro-intestinal, uro-genital and musculo-skeletal). Medical device companies also use sonomicrometry to assess the physical performance, durability and longevity of devices during R&D phase of development. Sonomicrometry is currently the most prevalent method for determining muscle length changes during animal locomotion, feeding, and other biomechanical functions.

When originally developed decades ago, care was taken to orient the crystals correctly to ensure satisfactory signal detection between the crystals, but more modern versions of sonomicrometer hardware (typically dating from 1995 to the present) do not require such attention to crystal orientation.

Sonomicrometer systems are used by scientists, engineers and biologists to measure the material properties of soft solids, gels, and fluids. Even though they are used to measure the mechanics and function of muscle tissue, there is no known medical or therapeutic use for these devices. Sonomicrometer devices are not used to treat or diagnose medical conditions in animals or humans.

== Mechanism ==
The primary criteria for making sonomicrometer measurements is that the intervening space or material between the crystals must be capable of ultrasonic sound conduction in the frequency range of 100 kHz to at least several MHz. This typically means that the crystals must operate in or on a medium composed of fluids, gels, soft solids and some hard solids, and this includes biological tissues (blood, muscle, fat, etc.). The measurement of distance between crystals becomes problematic or ceases completely if air gaps or solid objects intervene between the crystals.

Sonomicrometer measurements are only accurate when the medium surrounding the crystals or the object the crystals are measuring has a uniform speed of sound. In biological settings, almost all tissues have a speed of sound in the range of 1550 to 1600 meters per second, which is satisfactorily uniform to give accurate measurements to within 3% to 4%, and more typically to within 1%.

A sonomicrometer device measures distance by performing a timing measurement of the sound transmitted by one crystal and received by one (or more) adjacent crystals. The ability to resolve small differences in this transit-time (or "time-of-flight") directly correlates with the ability to resolve small changes in the distances between crystals. The first generation of sonomicrometer devices were analog devices that integrated the time-of-flight as a voltage ramp function. Their resolution was a function of the slope of the ramp and the electrical noise of system components. Those systems output the length measurements as an analog voltage. The second generation of sonomicrometer devices were digital—they measure time-of-flight by incrementing high-speed digital counters. Typically these are 12 to 16-bit counters operating from 32 to 128 MHz. A digital system will output length measurements in form of a digital number (the time-of-flight count value). Because of their digital nature, the resolution can be exactly specified as a function of counter clock frequency. For example, when making measurements in biological tissue at body temperature (velocity = 1,590 m/s), a digital sonomicrometer operating with a clock speed of 128 MHz will have a spatial resolution of 12 micrometres.

== Applications ==
Sonomicrometry is often used in studies of animal physiology where precise distances at high temporal resolution are needed, particularly when such distances are not externally measurable. Sonomicrometry crystals are most commonly implanted within skeletal or cardiac muscle tissue to track length changes during an activity (heartbeat, flapping a wing, chewing, etc.). However, they can be very useful for tracking movement of entire structures which are not visible but immersed in fluid, such as the bones in the mouth of a fish during feeding.
