= Methyl pyruvate =

Names
- Preferred IUPAC name Methyl 2-oxopropanoate

Identifiers
CAS Number	600-22-6
3D model (JSmol)	Interactive image
Beilstein Reference	1361953
ChEBI	CHEBI:51850
ChEMBL	ChEMBL3185405
ChemSpider	11255
ECHA InfoCard	100.009.081
EC Number	209-987-4
PubChem CID	11748
UNII	3KJM65G5XL
CompTox Dashboard (EPA)	DTXSID9049326
- InChI: InChI=1S/C4H6O3/c1-3(5)4(6)7-2/h1-2H3 Key: CWKLZLBVOJRSOM-UHFFFAOYSA-N
- SMILES: CC(=O)C(=O)OC

Properties
Chemical formula	C_{4}H_{6}O_{3}
Molar mass	102.089 g·mol^{−1}
Appearance	Colorless liquid
Melting point	−22 °C (−8 °F; 251 K)
Boiling point	135 °C (275 °F; 408 K)

Hazards
- GHS labelling
Pictograms	(GHS02: Flammable) (GHS05: Corrosive) (GHS07: Exclamation mark)
Signal word	Danger
Hazard statements	H226, H317, H318, H335
Precautionary statements	P210, P233, P240, P241, P242, P243, P261, P271, P272, P280, P302+P352, P303+P361+P353, P304+P340, P305+P351+P338, P310, P312, P321, P333+P313, P363, P370+P378, P403+P233, P403+P235, P405, P501
- Except where otherwise noted, data are given for materials in their standard state (at 25 °C [77 °F], 100 kPa). Infobox references

Methyl pyruvate is the organic compound with the formula CH_{3}C(O)CO_{2}CH_{3}. This colorless liquid is the methyl ester of pyruvic acid. It has attracted interest as a prochiral precursor to alanine and lactic acid. It is prepared by esterification of pyruvic acid.
