= Troleandomycin =

Chemical compound

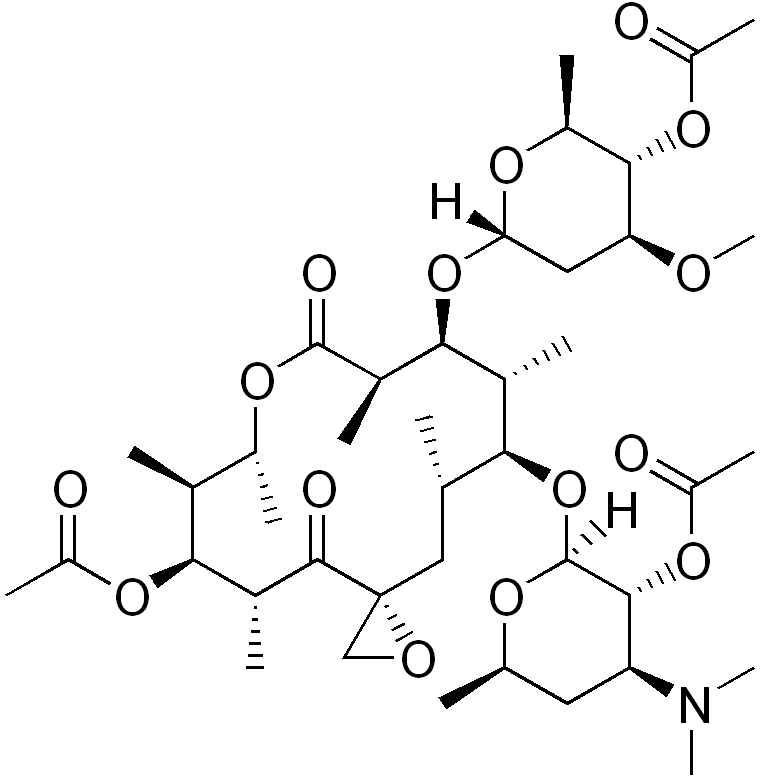

Clinical data
- AHFS/Drugs.com: Multum Consumer Information
- MedlinePlus: a604026
- ATC code: J01FA08 (WHO)

Identifiers
- IUPAC name: (3R,5R,6R,7S,8R,11R,12S,13R,14S,15S)-12-[(4-O-acetyl-2,6-dideoxy-3-O-methyl-α-L-arabino-hexopyranosyl)oxy]-14-{[2-O-acetyl-3,4,6-trideoxy-3-(dimethylamino)-β-D-xylo-hexopyranosyl]oxy}-5,7,8,11,13,15-hexamethyl-4,10-dioxo-1,9-dioxaspiro[2.13]hexadec-6-yl acetate
- CAS Number: 2751-09-9
- PubChem CID: 5284630
- DrugBank: DB01361
- ChemSpider: 4447675
- UNII: C4DZ64560D
- KEGG: D01322
- ChEBI: CHEBI:45735
- ChEMBL: ChEMBL564085
- PDB ligand: TAO (PDBe, RCSB PDB)
- CompTox Dashboard (EPA): DTXSID2023721
- ECHA InfoCard: 100.018.539

Chemical and physical data
- Formula: C_{41}H_{67}NO_{15}
- Molar mass: 813.979 g·mol^{−1}
- 3D model (JSmol): Interactive image
- SMILES: O=C(O[C@@H]4[C@@H](N(C)C)C[C@H](O[C@H]4O[C@@H]3[C@H]([C@H](O[C@@H]1O[C@H]([C@H](OC(=O)C)[C@@H](OC)C1)C)[C@H](C(=O)O[C@H](C)[C@H](C)[C@H](OC(=O)C)[C@H](C(=O)[C@]2(OC2)C[C@@H]3C)C)C)C)C)C
- InChI: InChI=1S/C41H67NO15/c1-19-17-41(18-49-41)38(46)23(5)34(53-27(9)43)21(3)25(7)52-39(47)24(6)35(56-32-16-31(48-14)36(26(8)51-32)54-28(10)44)22(4)33(19)57-40-37(55-29(11)45)30(42(12)13)15-20(2)50-40/h19-26,30-37,40H,15-18H2,1-14H3/t19-,20+,21-,22+,23+,24+,25+,26-,30-,31-,32-,33-,34-,35-,36-,37+,40-,41-/m0/s1; Key:LQCLVBQBTUVCEQ-MCQAQMIOSA-N

Troleandomycin (TAO for short) is a macrolide antibiotic. It was sold in Italy (branded Triocetin) and Turkey (branded Tekmisin). It is no longer sold in Italy as of 2018.

The drug's mode of action is to bind to the ribosome, specifically in the tunnel through which the newly formed peptide egresses, thereby halting protein synthesis. Troleandomycin is a CYP3A4 inhibitor that may cause drug interactions.
