= Sporogenesis =

Reproduction via or production of spores

Sporogenesis is the production of spores in biology. The term is also used to refer to the process of reproduction via spores. Reproductive spores were found to be formed in eukaryotic organisms, such as plants, algae and fungi, during their normal reproductive life cycle. Dormant spores are formed, for example by certain fungi and algae, primarily in response to unfavorable growing conditions. Most eukaryotic spores are haploid and form through cell division, though some types are diploids or dikaryons and form through cell fusion. This type of reproduction can also be called single pollination.

== Reproduction via spores ==
Reproductive spores are generally the result of cell division, most commonly meiosis (e.g. in plant sporophytes). Sporic meiosis is needed to complete the sexual life cycle of the organisms using it.

In some cases, sporogenesis occurs via mitosis (e.g. in some fungi and algae). Mitotic sporogenesis is a form of asexual reproduction. Examples are the conidial fungi Aspergillus and Penicillium, for which mitospore formation appears to be the primary mode of reproduction. Other fungi, such as ascomycetes, utilize both mitotic and meiotic spores. The red alga Polysiphonia alternates between mitotic and meiotic sporogenesis and both processes are required to complete its complex reproductive life cycle.

In the case of dormant spores in eukaryotes, sporogenesis often occurs as a result of fertilization or karyogamy forming a diploid spore equivalent to a zygote. Therefore, zygospores are the result of sexual reproduction.

Reproduction via spores involves the spreading of the spores by water or air. Algae and some fungi (chytrids) often use motile zoospores that can swim to new locations before developing into sessile organisms. Airborne spores are obvious in fungi, for example when they are released from puffballs. Other fungi have more active spore dispersal mechanisms. For example, the fungus Pilobolus can shoot its sporangia towards light. Plant spores designed for dispersal are also referred to as diaspores. Plant spores are most obvious in the reproduction of ferns and mosses. However, they also exist in flowering plants where they develop hidden inside the flower. For example, the pollen grains of flowering plants develop out of microspores produced in the anthers.

Reproductive spores grow into multicellular haploid individuals or sporelings. In heterosporous organisms, two types of spores exist: microspores give rise to males and megaspores to females. In homosporous organisms, all spores look alike and grow into individuals carrying reproductive parts of both genders.

== Formation of reproductive spores ==
Sporogenesis occurs in reproductive structures termed sporangia. The process involves sporogenous cells (sporocytes, also called spore mother cells) undergoing cell division to give rise to spores.

In meiotic sporogenesis, a diploid spore mother cell within the sporangium undergoes meiosis, producing a tetrad of haploid spores. In organisms that are heterosporous, two types of spores occur: Microsporangia produce male microspores, and megasporangia produce female megaspores. In megasporogenesis, often three of the four spores degenerate after meiosis, whereas in microsporogenesis all four microspores survive.

In gymnosperms, such as conifers, microspores are produced through meiosis from microsporocytes in microstrobili or male cones. In flowering plants, microspores are produced in the anthers of flowers. Each anther contains four pollen sacs, which contain the microsporocytes. After meiosis, each microspore undergoes mitotic cell division, giving rise to multicellular pollen grains (six nuclei in gymnosperms, three nuclei in flowering plants).

Megasporogenesis occurs in megastrobili in conifers (for example a pine cone) and inside the ovule in the flowers of flowering plants. A megasporocyte inside a megasporangium or ovule undergoes meiosis, producing four megaspores. Only one is a functional megaspore whereas the others stay dysfunctional or degenerate. The megaspore undergoes several mitotic divisions to develop into a female gametophyte (for example the seven-cell/eight-nuclei embryo sac in flowering plants).

=== Mitospore formation ===
Some fungi and algae produce mitospores through mitotic cell division within a sporangium. In fungi, such mitospores are referred to as conidia.

== Formation of dormant spores ==
Some algae, and fungi form resting spores made to survive unfavorable conditions. Typically, changes in the environment from favorable to unfavorable growing conditions will trigger a switch from asexual reproduction to sexual reproduction in these organisms. The resulting spores are protected through the formation of a thick cell wall and can withstand harsh conditions such as drought or extreme temperatures. Examples are chlamydospores, teliospores, zygospores, and myxospores. Similar survival structures produced in some bacteria are known as endospores.

=== Chlamydospore and teliospore formation ===
Chlamydospores are generally multicellular, asexual structures. Teliospores are a form of chlamydospore produced through the fusion of cells or hyphae where the nuclei of the fused cells stay separate. These nuclei undergo karyogamy and meiosis upon germination of the spore.

=== Zygospore, oospore and auxospore formation ===
Zygospores are formed in certain fungi (zygomycota, for example Rhizopus) and some algae (for example Chlamydomonas). The zygospore forms through the isogamic fusion of two cells (motile single cells in Chlamydomonas) or sexual conjugation between two hyphae (in zygomycota). Plasmogamy is followed by karyogamy, therefore zygospores are diploid (zygotes). They will undergo zygotic meiosis upon germinating.

In oomycetes, the zygote forms through the fertilization of an egg cell with a sperm nucleus and enters a resting stage as a diploid, thick-walled oospore. The germinating oospore undergoes mitosis and gives rise to diploid hyphae which reproduce asexually via mitotic zoospores as long as conditions are favorable.

In diatoms, fertilization gives rise to a zygote termed auxospore. Besides sexual reproduction and as a resting stage, the function of an auxospore is the restoration of the original cell size, as diatoms get progressively smaller during mitotic cell division. Auxospores divide by mitosis.

=== Endospore formation ===
The term sporogenesis can also refer to endospore formation in bacteria, which allows the cells to survive unfavorable conditions. Endospores are not reproductive structures and their formation does not require cell fusion or division. Instead, they form through the production of an encapsulating spore coat within the spore-forming cell.

== Parts of the spore ==
There are many parts of the spore 'plant'. The structure enclosing a group of spores is called a sporangium.

== Bibliography ==
- S.S. Mader (2007): Biology, 9th edition, McGraw Hill Companies, New York, ISBN 978-0-07-246463-4
- P.H. Raven, R.F. Evert, S.E. Eichhorn (2005): Biology of Plants, 7th Edition, W.H. Freeman and Company Publishers, New York, ISBN 0-7167-1007-2
