= Rhizobium etli =

Scientific classification
- Domain: Bacteria
- Kingdom: Pseudomonadati
- Phylum: Pseudomonadota
- Class: Alphaproteobacteria
- Order: Hyphomicrobiales
- Family: Rhizobiaceae
- Genus: Rhizobium
- Species: R. etli

Binomial name
- Rhizobium etli Segovia et al. 1993

Type strain
- ATCC 51251; CFN 42; CIP 104814; DSM 11541; HAMBI 1727; IFO 15573; JCM 21823; LMG 17827; NBRC 15573

Biovars
- symbiovar mimosae; symbiovar phaseoli

Species of bacterium

Rhizobium etli is a Gram-negative root-nodule bacterium.
