= Potassium tellurite =

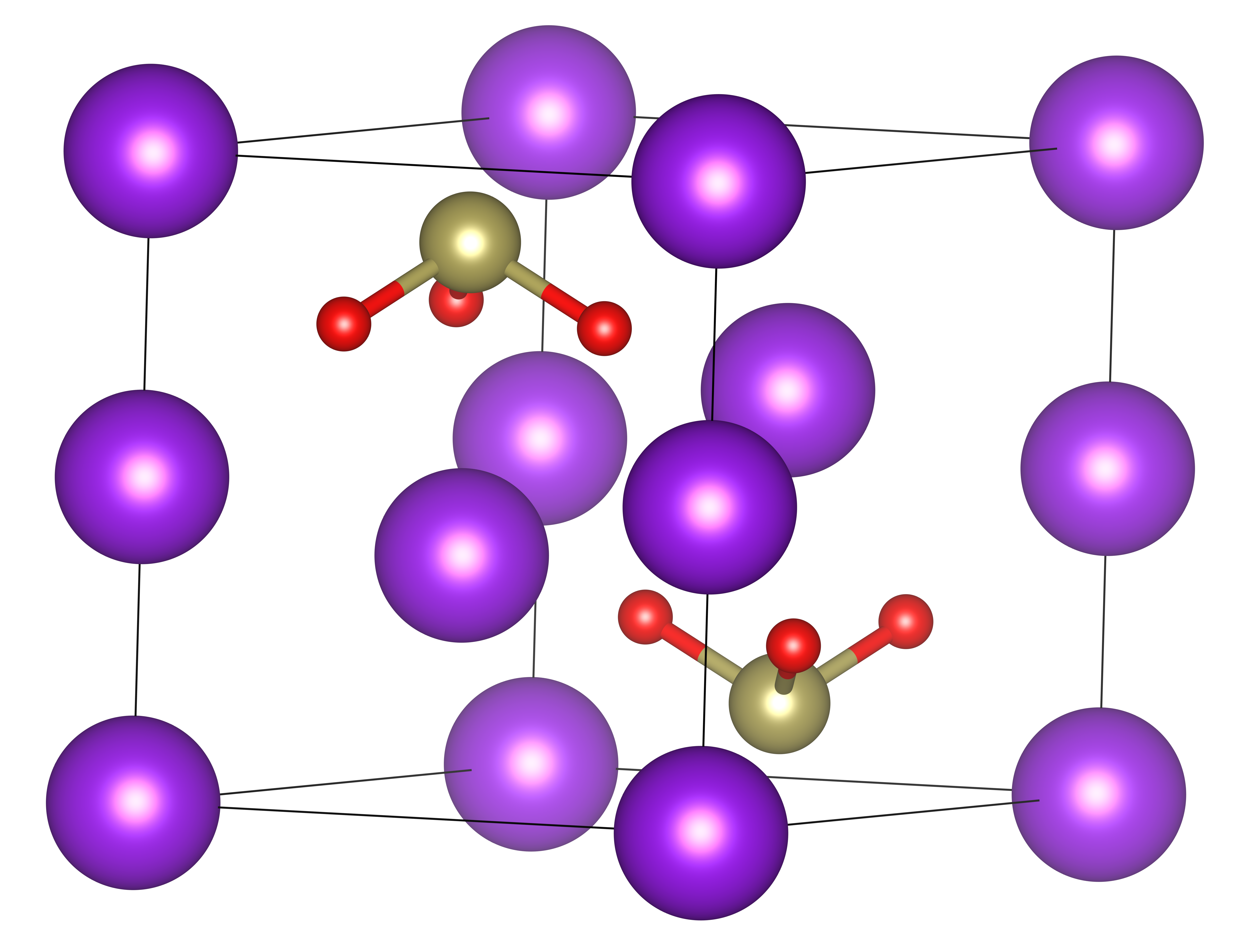

Identifiers
| CAS Number | 7790-58-1 |
| 3D model (JSmol) | Interactive image |
| ChEBI | CHEBI:75248 |
| ChemSpider | 58685 |
| ECHA InfoCard | 100.029.285 |
| EC Number | 232-213-1 |
| PubChem CID | 65186 |
| UNII | 71M41949N8 |
| CompTox Dashboard (EPA) | DTXSID50999096 |
- InChI: InChI=1S/2K.H2O3Te/c;;1-4(2)3/h;;(H2,1,2,3)/q2*+1;/p-2 Key: BFPJYWDBBLZXOM-UHFFFAOYSA-L
- SMILES: [O-][Te](=O)[O-].[K+].[K+]

Properties
| Chemical formula | K_{2}TeO_{3} |
| Appearance | white crystals, powder |

Hazards
- GHS labelling
| Pictograms | (GHS06: Toxic) (GHS07: Exclamation mark) |
| Signal word | Danger |
| Hazard statements | H301, H315, H319, H335 |
| Precautionary statements | P261, P264, P270, P271, P280, P301+P310, P302+P352, P304+P340, P305+P351+P338, P312, P321, P330, P332+P313, P337+P313, P362, P403+P233, P405, P501 |
- Except where otherwise noted, data are given for materials in their standard state (at 25 °C [77 °F], 100 kPa). Infobox references

Potassium tellurite, K_{2}TeO_{3}, is an inorganic potassium-tellurium compound. It has been used as a selective growth medium in microbiology.
