= Sodium lactate =

Chemical compound

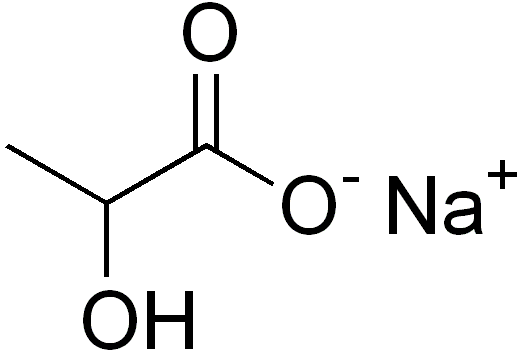

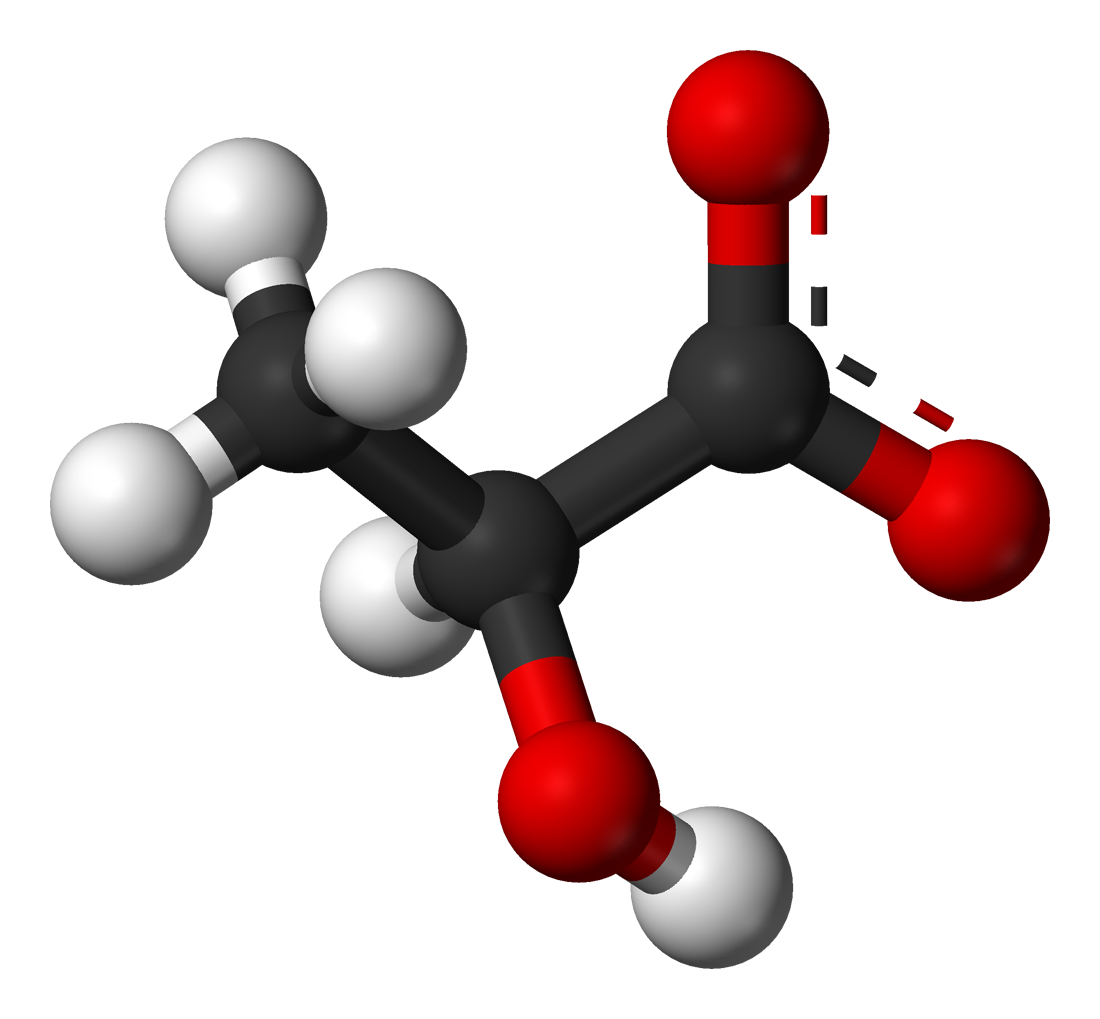
Ball-and-stick model of the lactate anion
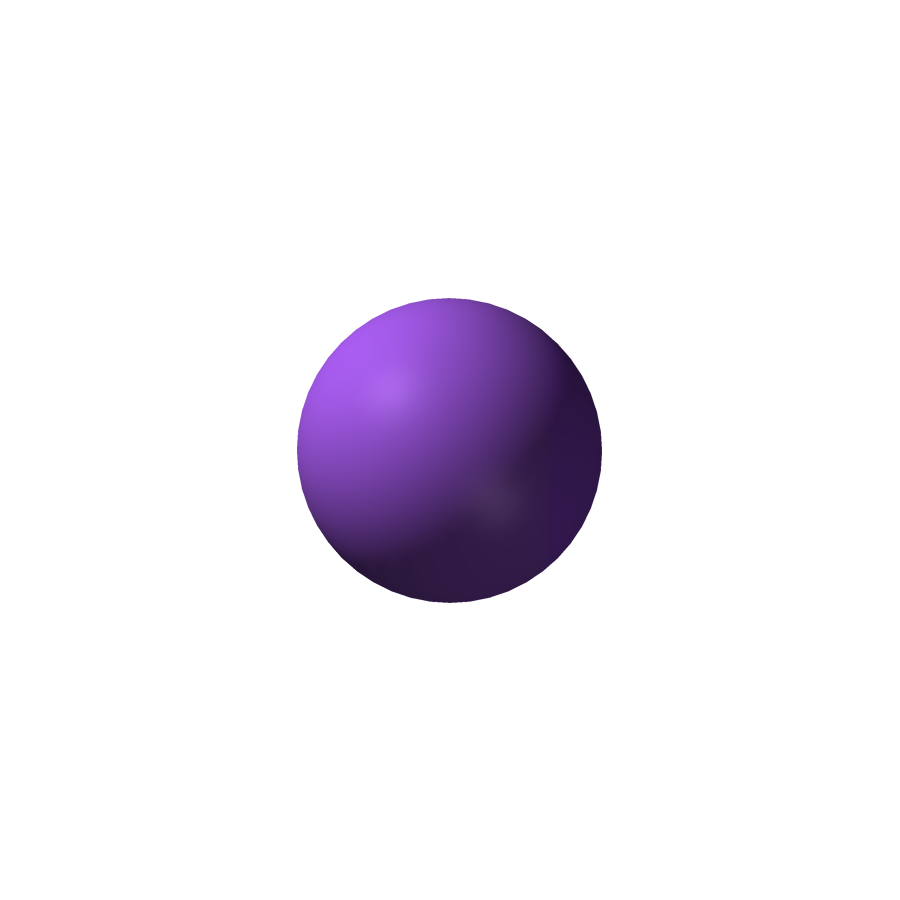
The sodium cation

Names
- Preferred IUPAC name Sodium 2-hydroxypropanoate
- Other names: Sodium DL-lactate; Lactic acid sodium salt; E325

Identifiers
CAS Number	72-17-3
3D model (JSmol)	Interactive image
ChEBI	CHEBI:75228
ChEMBL	ChEMBL1357
ChemSpider	6049
ECHA InfoCard	100.000.702
E number	E325 (antioxidants, ...)
PubChem CID	6286
UNII	TU7HW0W0QT
CompTox Dashboard (EPA)	DTXSID6052829
- InChI: InChI=1S/C3H6O3.Na/c1-2(4)3(5)6;/h2,4H,1H3,(H,5,6);/q;+1/p-1 Key: NGSFWBMYFKHRBD-UHFFFAOYSA-M; InChI=1/C3H6O3.Na/c1-2(4)3(5)6;/h2,4H,1H3,(H,5,6);/q;+1/p-1 Key: NGSFWBMYFKHRBD-REWHXWOFAR
- SMILES: [Na+].[O-]C(=O)C(O)C

Properties
Chemical formula	C_{3}H_{5}NaO_{3}
Molar mass	112.06 g/mol
Appearance	White powder
Density	1.33 g/mL, 1.31 g/ml (60 % syrup)
Melting point	161 to 162 °C (322 to 324 °F; 434 to 435 K) 17 °C (60 % syrup)
Boiling point	113 °C (235 °F; 386 K) (60 % syrup)
Solubility in water	> 1.5 g/mL

Hazards
Flash point	< 25
- Lethal dose or concentration (LD, LC)
LD_{50} (median dose)	1000 mg/kg (intravenous, rat)
- Except where otherwise noted, data are given for materials in their standard state (at 25 °C [77 °F], 100 kPa). verify (what is ?) Infobox references

Sodium lactate is the sodium salt of lactic acid, and has a mild saline taste. It is produced by fermentation of a sugar source, such as maize (corn) or beets, and then, by neutralizing the resulting lactic acid to create a compound having the formula NaC_{3}H_{5}O_{3}.

Sodium lactate, in the form of Ringer's lactate solution, is used as a medication, and is included on the World Health Organization's List of Essential Medicines.

== Uses ==
=== Food industry ===
As a food additive, sodium lactate has the E number E325 and is naturally a liquid product, but also is available in powder form. It acts as a preservative, acidity regulator, and bulking agent.

Despite the similarity in name, sodium lactate itself is not chemically similar to lactose (milk sugar), so need not be restricted by those with lactose intolerance.

=== Cosmetics and personal care products ===
Sodium lactate is sometimes used in shampoo products and other similar items such as liquid soaps, as it is an effective humectant and moisturizer.

=== Medical use ===
Sodium lactate is used to treat arrhythmias caused by overdosing of class I antiarrythmics, as well as pressor sympathomimetics which can cause hypertension.

It can be given intravenously as a source of bicarbonate for preventing or controlling mild to moderate metabolic acidosis in patients with restricted oral intake (for sodium bicarbonate) whose oxidative processes are not seriously impaired. However, the use in lactic acidosis is contraindicated.

Sodium lactate may induce panic attacks in persons with existing panic disorder; up to 72% of individuals with panic disorder experience a panic attack when administered sodium lactate intravenously. Sodium lactate may therefore also be used to confirm a diagnosis of panic disorder.

In 2023, it was the 289th most commonly prescribed medication in the United States, with more than 500,000 prescriptions.

== Chemistry and biochemistry ==
Sodium lactate is not chemically similar to lactose (milk sugar).

=== Production ===
In general, lactates such as sodium, calcium, and potassium lactate are salts derived from the neutralization of lactic acid and most commercially used lactic acids are fermented from dairy-free products such as cornstarch, potatoes, or molasses. Sugar or tapioca additionally may be used.

In some rare instances, some lactic acid is fermented from dairy products such as whey and lactose. Whey is made of up 6.5% solids of which 4.8% is solid lactose. Waste whey is infrequently used to produce lactic acid when the whey itself is produced as waste during the manufacture of certain dairy products. Such dairy-type lactic acid generally goes back into dairy products, such as ice cream and cream cheese, rather than into non-dairy products. Moreover, although the lactic-acid starter culture to ferment corn or beets may contain milk, sodium lactate does not contain milk protein and need not be restricted by someone avoiding milk or those with a milk allergy.
