= Ex vivo =

Process of biological interventions on extracted fragments of organisms

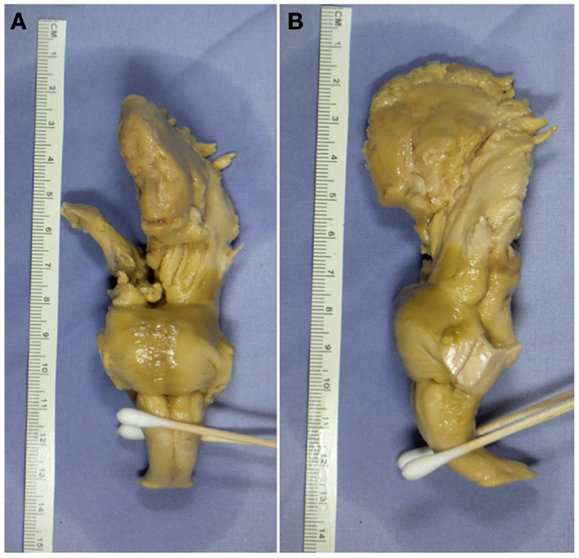
Ex vivo brainstem specimen: A. Coronal section showing the anterior aspect of the tissue. B. Sagittal section of the left side.

Ex vivo (Latin for 'out of the living') is a term for biological studies involving tissues, organs, or cells maintained outside their native organism under controlled laboratory conditions. By carefully managing factors such as temperature, oxygenation, humidity, and nutrient delivery, as well as by perfusing a nutrient solution through the vasculature, researchers sustain the extracted materials' viability, structural integrity, and physiological function temporarily to conduct experiments that would be difficult or unethical in a living organism. Ex vivo models are a middle ground between in vitro (lit. 'in the glass') models, which typically use isolated cells, and in vivo (lit. 'in the living') studies conducted inside living organisms.

Ex vivo models are used for pharmacological screening, toxicology testing, organ transplant evaluation, developmental biology, as well as studies of disease mechanisms across fields ranging from cardiology to neuroscience, dermatology, and orthopedics. Since the models often use human tissues obtained from clinical procedures or biobanks, they can reduce reliance on live-animal experimentation; their utility, however, is limited by finite viability, incomplete systemic integration, and post-mortem ('after-death') biochemical changes that accumulate over time. The earliest perfusion studies were conducted in the mid-19th century, and advances in sterilization, imaging, and microfluidics enabled wider adoption into the 20th and 21st centuries. Regulatory oversight depends on specimen origin: human ex vivo research is subject to informed consent, whereas animal-derived specimens fall under animal care guidelines.

== Principles and definition ==
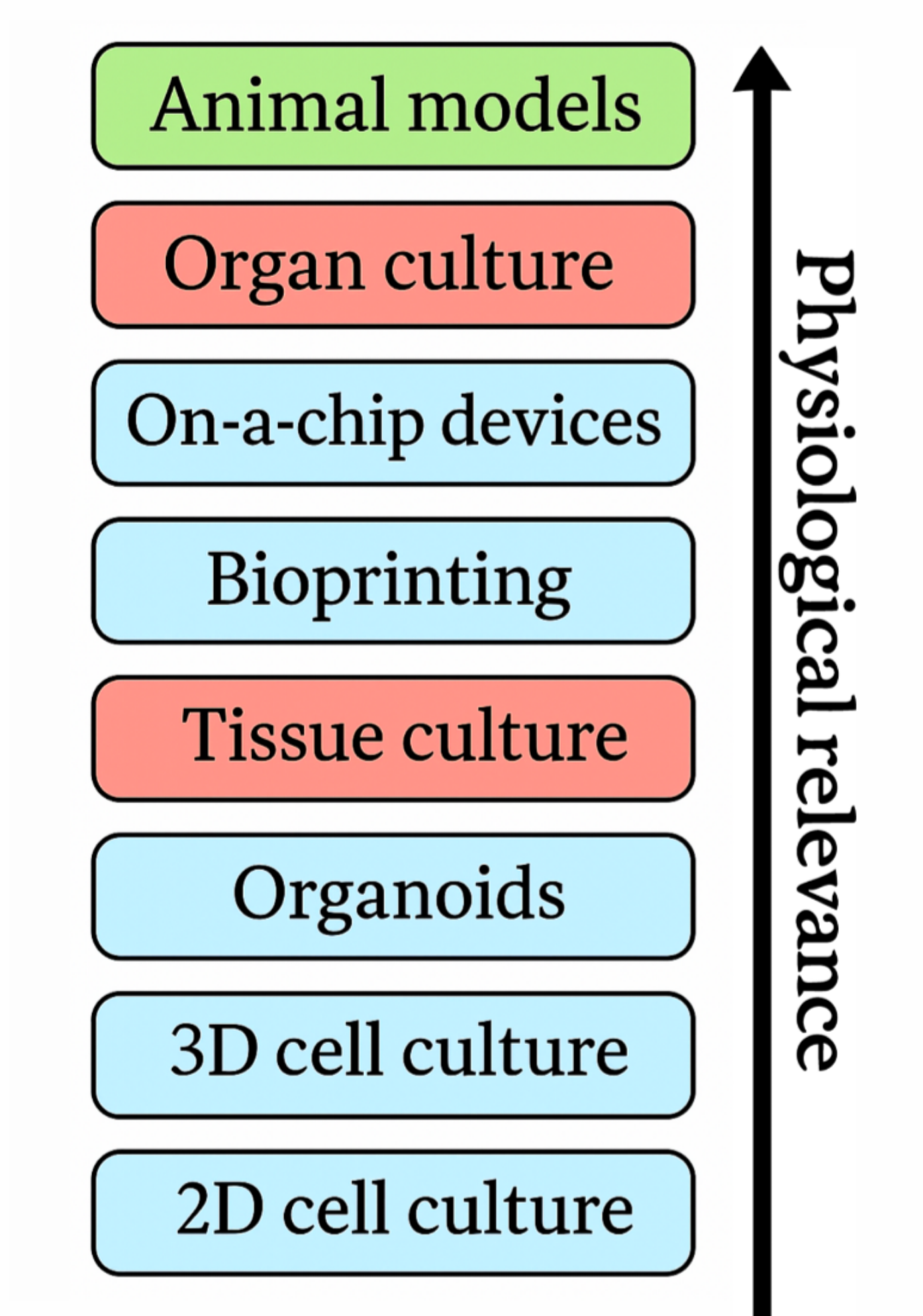
Experimental models color-coded to indicate classification as in vivo (green), ex vivo (red), or in vitro (blue), and arranged in ascending order of physiological relevance

Ex vivo, literally 'out of the living' in Latin, refers to biological studies involving tissues, organs, or cells maintained outside their native organism under tightly controlled laboratory conditions. These studies preserve the extracted materials' viability, physiological function, and structural integrity temporarily by managing conditions such as oxygenation, temperature, nutrient delivery, and humidity, depending on the specific requirements of the model. These conditions are often facilitated through cell culture media (nutrient-rich liquid formulations) or perfusion chambers that continuously pump fluid through tissue to mimic blood flow.

Physiological relevance is the degree to which an experimental system reproduces the structural, mechanical, biochemical, and functional characteristics of a living organism. In vivo models preserve the full complexity of physiology by conducting experiments within living organisms, therefore rank highest in terms of physiological relevance. As an intermediate approach between in vivo models and in vitro ones (the latter of which typically use isolated cells in artificial environments), ex vivo models preserve more of the native tissue architecture than traditional cell cultures, while allowing greater experimental control than whole-organism studies. In doing so, ex vivo models address some of the limitations of in vitro work, such as oversimplified cellular interactions (how cells signal to or influence one another), and can help mitigate the systemic variability inherent to in vivo models, as when fluctuations in an organism's hormones, immune status, and overall health obscure the effect being studied.

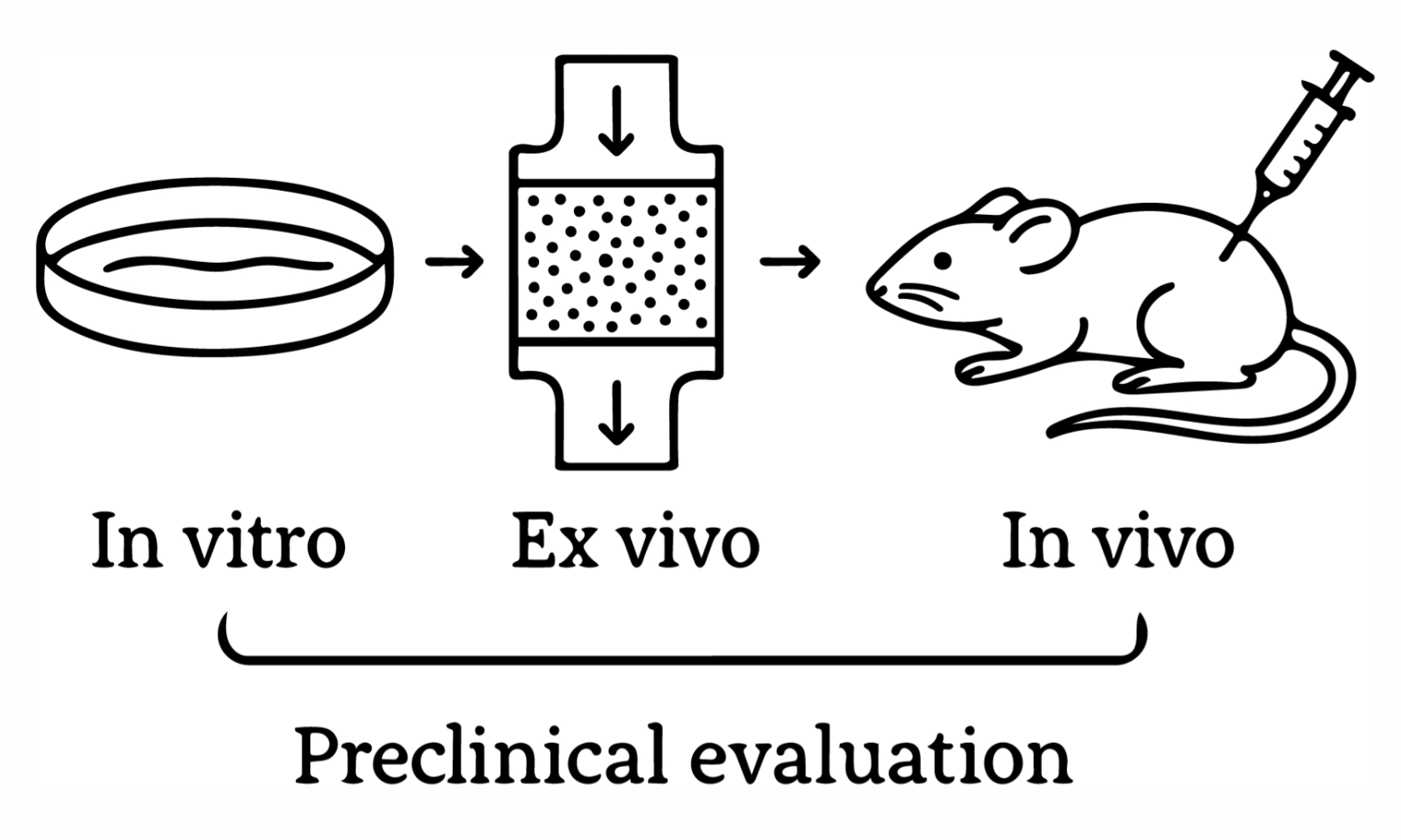
The preclinical development of new bone therapies often starts with in vitro studies followed by in vivo testing. Ex vivo models, such as bone explant cultures, may serve as an intermediate approach.

In the preclinical development of therapies for bone diseases, for example, in vitro cell studies are typically performed prior to in vivo testing in animals, as the latter approach is more costly, time-intensive, and complex, requiring large sample sizes to yield statistically meaningful results. However, in vitro findings do not always predict in vivo responses due to the absence of native tissue architecture, including the extracellular matrix (ECM), and the lack of cell–cell/cell–matrix interactions. Ex vivo bone explant cultures preserve many aspects of native tissue architecture by maintaining tissue integrity outside the organism for a limited period, and reduce the complexity of in vivo testing by excluding systemic variables and enabling controlled investigation of specific biological or mechanical factors. Another example is the use of ex vivo models during the preclinical evaluation of intestinal drug transport. Unlike in vivo studies, which rely on animal models and are therefore affected by interspecies differences, ex vivo approaches can utilize resected human intestinal segments, more accurately representing human physiological conditions.

The boundary between ex vivo and in vitro models remains contested, particularly in the fields of regenerative medicine and tissue engineering, where the terms have been used interchangeably in many studies. In vitro systems have progressed from simple two-dimensional cell cultures to advanced three-dimensional constructs, such as organoids and organ-on-a-chip devices, that replicate aspects of tissue architecture, further complicating the distinction. Klein and Hutmacher (2024) propose that a model may be classified as ex vivo if it meets one or more of the following criteria:

- It preserves the native structure and composition of a cell, tissue, or organ without disrupting its cellular or extracellular components.
- It is used in therapeutic contexts where cells, organs, or tissues are removed and then reimplanted. (Note: One example is ex vivo gene editing, a therapeutic technique in which cells are extracted from a patient and genetically modified outside the body to correct a defective gene. The modified cells are subsequently reintroduced into the patient to treat conditions arising from pathogenic mutations.)
- It links explanted organs or tissues to artificial circulation via perfusion.

According to these criteria, systems involving extensive reorganization or manipulation—including organoids, organ-on-a-chip, and organotypic cultures—are considered in vitro, even when they replicate certain organ-level functions.

In general, in vitro models are more flexible and relatively inexpensive, allowing researchers to test new treatments quickly and adjust experimental parameters as needed. Ex vivo systems are less adaptable but often provide a more reliable indication of how a treatment will work in the human body and what side effects it might cause. They are, however, subject to inherent limitations, including post-mortem ('after-death') alterations in biophysical properties, progressive tissue degradation, limited viability duration, and typically the absence or only artificial replication of circulation and innervation. (Note: Specialized ex vivo models have been developed to preserve native innervation. Although many standard ex vivo intestinal preparations, for example, result in the loss of extrinsic neural connections during tissue removal, certain dissection techniques maintain continuity between the intestinal extrinsic nerves and the spinal cord, thereby preserving physiologically relevant signaling.) These factors can restrict the models' capacity to reproduce long-term or systemic physiological effects. Some of these limitations also complicate direct comparisons with in vivo systems; for example, studies measuring how electric fields behave in primate brain tissue during stimulation have found that results differ markedly between in vivo and ex vivo conditions—and the longer the tissue has been removed from the body, the greater the discrepancy, partly due to cooling and loss of normal biological function. In addition, microglia undergo substantial alterations under ex vivo conditions.

== Techniques and applications ==
=== Organ perfusion ===
Organ perfusion involves circulating oxygenated solutions through isolated organs to sustain their viability. For example, ex vivo lung perfusion (EVLP) is used to evaluate donor lungs prior to transplantation. An EVLP system includes a ventilator connected to the lung via an endotracheal tube to simulate natural respiration and enable alveolar gas exchange. The typical perfusion circuit consists of a centrifugal pump to circulate the perfusate, a reservoir to collect effluent, a heat exchanger for temperature regulation, a leukocyte filter to remove white blood cells, a flow probe to measure perfusate flow, and a membrane gas exchanger to adjust oxygen and carbon dioxide concentrations in the circulating fluid. Cannulas link the circuit to the lung's pulmonary artery and left atrial cuff.

In cardiovascular research, a Langendorff heart preparation removes a heart and perfuses it with a nutrient solution, preserving structure and conduction pathways for investigation of arrhythmias or drug effects without the complexity of an in vivo model. Several ex vivo perfusion systems have been developed to reduce ischemic injury during the organ preservation phase. One of them is the Organ Care System (OCS), which maintains the heart in a non-beating, but metabolically active, state by circulating donor blood; the blood is treated with heparin to prevent clotting and supplemented with a proprietary perfusate formulation. In translational pharmacology, perfusion platforms restore pulsatile blood flow in isolated human organs, enabling direct measurement of absorption, metabolism, and toxicity prior to first-in-human trials. By supplying pharmacokinetic data on viable human tissue rather than relying on animal models or cell assays, the platforms inform clinical trial decisions and may reduce animal testing.

Not all forms of organ perfusion are ex vivo; in situ perfusion techniques are employed during organ retrieval to restore blood flow to organs while they remain within the body, minimizing ischemic injury and preserving viability for transplantation. A related example is selective in situ perfusion during surgery, such as isolated hepatic perfusion (IHP), which is used for targeted chemotherapy.

=== Organ culture ===
Organ culture typically involves maintaining organ sections or small fragments in static or semi-static conditions without active perfusion. The use of culture media to sustain excised tissues or organs does not alter their classification as ex vivo models, provided that the native tissue architecture remains preserved, in accordance with the criteria proposed by Klein and Hutmacher (2024). In dermatological research, human skin organ culture (HSOC) is a technique in which excised human skin is maintained in an artificial medium that preserves its native architecture. HSOC models are employed to study wound healing, drug penetration, and toxicological responses. By retaining the structural complexity of human skin, these models facilitate the investigation of conditions that are not reproducible in animal models, such as keloid formation. (Note: In animals, researchers can induce hypertrophic scars, which are somewhat similar to keloids, but keloid formation does not occur. Even in animal models designed to exhibit excessive fibrotic responses through genetic manipulation or specific treatments, the characteristic features of keloids—such as growth beyond the original wound margins and tendency to persist or recur without regression—are not observed.)

Cell culture involves isolating individual cells from tissue and growing them in a medium enriched with nutrients and growth factors. While these cultures retain some functional characteristics of their tissue of origin, they often exhibit changes in phenotype and gene expression over time. Primary cell cultures, taken directly from tissue, retain physiological characteristics that immortalized cell lines lose over time, which is useful for studying cellular behavior, disease mechanisms, and drug effects in conditions closer to those found in vivo.

=== Microscopy and imaging ===
Ex vivo microscopy (EVM) uses advanced digital microscopes (such as confocal or optical-coherence devices) to produce microscopic images of fresh tissue, without mounting thin sections on glass slides. Because the tissue stays intact, surgeons can assess tumor margins or examine biopsy samples during surgery.

Computed tomography (CT) is used in ex vivo research to produce non-destructive, high-resolution images of internal structures.

=== Energy–tissue interaction studies ===
Human skin explants from surgical procedures allow researchers to observe early-stage physiological responses to laser treatments in ways that closely resemble in vivo conditions, though processes like re-epithelialization occur more slowly than in living tissue. In intervertebral disc research, ex vivo models that retain vertebral bone allow for testing potential drugs and investigating loading effects on disc degeneration and repair.

In biosensing and electroanalytical applications, ex vivo methods offer experimental flexibility unavailable in living systems. While many in vivo experiments favor micro- and nanoelectrodes to minimize invasiveness, larger electrodes are routinely used for specific purposes. Ex vivo approaches, by contrast, permit custom electrode geometries that interface precisely with biological tissues under controlled conditions, without the same constraints on size and invasiveness. This adaptability enables detailed examination of biological analytes and their physiological roles. Ex vivo electroanalytical methods are applied in neuroscience, pharmacology, and biomedical engineering to study neurotransmitter dynamics, metabolic activity, and disease-associated biomarkers.

In some cases, ex vivo electroporation, in which an electric field is applied to cells to facilitate the uptake of genetic material, is used to introduce DNA into cells within tissue slices, allowing researchers to study gene expression in a controlled environment.

== History ==
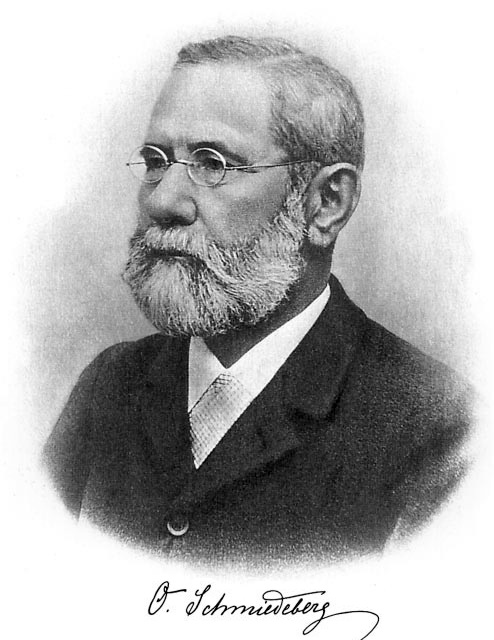
Oswald Schmiedeberg

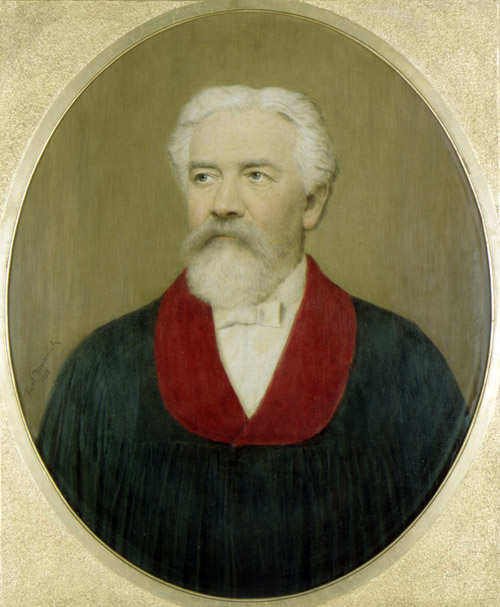
Oscar Langendorff

The foundational techniques and concepts of ex vivo experimentation were developed in the 19th century, although the term and formalized protocols came later. In 1846, German physiologist Carl Ludwig and his student Carl Wild conducted one of the earliest perfusion studies, connecting an excised animal heart to the common carotid artery of a living animal. It allowed the living animal's circulation to perfuse the coronary vessels of the excised organ. However, because the heart remained dependent on a living organism rather than an artificial perfusion system, the preparation does not meet the criteria for ex vivo experimentation. The earliest known studies involving the perfusion of kidneys outside the native organism were conducted by German physiologist Carl Eduard Loebell, who presented his findings in a doctoral dissertation (Note: Titled De conditionibus, quibus secretiones in glandulis perficiuntur (transl. 'On the conditions under which secretions are produced in the glands'), the dissertation was presented at the University of Marburg, Germany. This monograph, written in Latin, is available for browsing on Google Books and the Deutsche Digitale Bibliothek.) in 1849. In 1866, Russian physiologist Elias von Cyon developed the isolated perfused frog heart preparation at the Carl Ludwig Institute of Physiology in Leipzig, Germany. This method was commonly used during the late 19th century and later served as the basis for the isolated perfused mammalian heart preparation. In 1876, German physiologist Gustav von Bunge and German pharmacologist Oswald Schmiedeberg demonstrated the synthesis of hippuric acid in the isolated dog kidney. In 1885, German physiologist Maximilian von Frey and Austrian biologist Max von Gruber, working at the Carl Ludwig Institute of Physiology, constructed an apparatus combining a mechanical pump with an early oxygenator that substituted the function of the heart and lungs in experiments on dogs. This device oxygenated blood outside the body and was a precursor to the heart–lung machine.

In the 1880s, British physiologist Sydney Ringer developed a salt solution that sustained rhythmic contractions in the isolated frog heart. Later named Ringer's solution, it enabled extended observation of cardiac activity and supported controlled experimental studies on cardiac physiology in isolated preparations. In 1895, German physiologist Oskar Langendorff introduced a method for isolated heart perfusion involving retrograde flow through the aorta to supply the coronary circulation. The Langendorff preparation allowed for direct measurement of cardiac function and precise control of perfusion parameters while minimizing systemic confounders inherent to in vivo models. It became a widely used technique in the study of cardiac physiology and remains a standard method in cardiovascular research. At the turn of the 20th century, researchers initiated efforts to preserve animal tissues ex vivo within laboratory settings. Early experiments involved isolating tissues from organisms and transferring them to external media to develop reliable cultivation techniques. These studies aimed not only to maintain cellular viability but also to stimulate tissue growth, often using blood plasma typically sourced from the same animal as the medium.

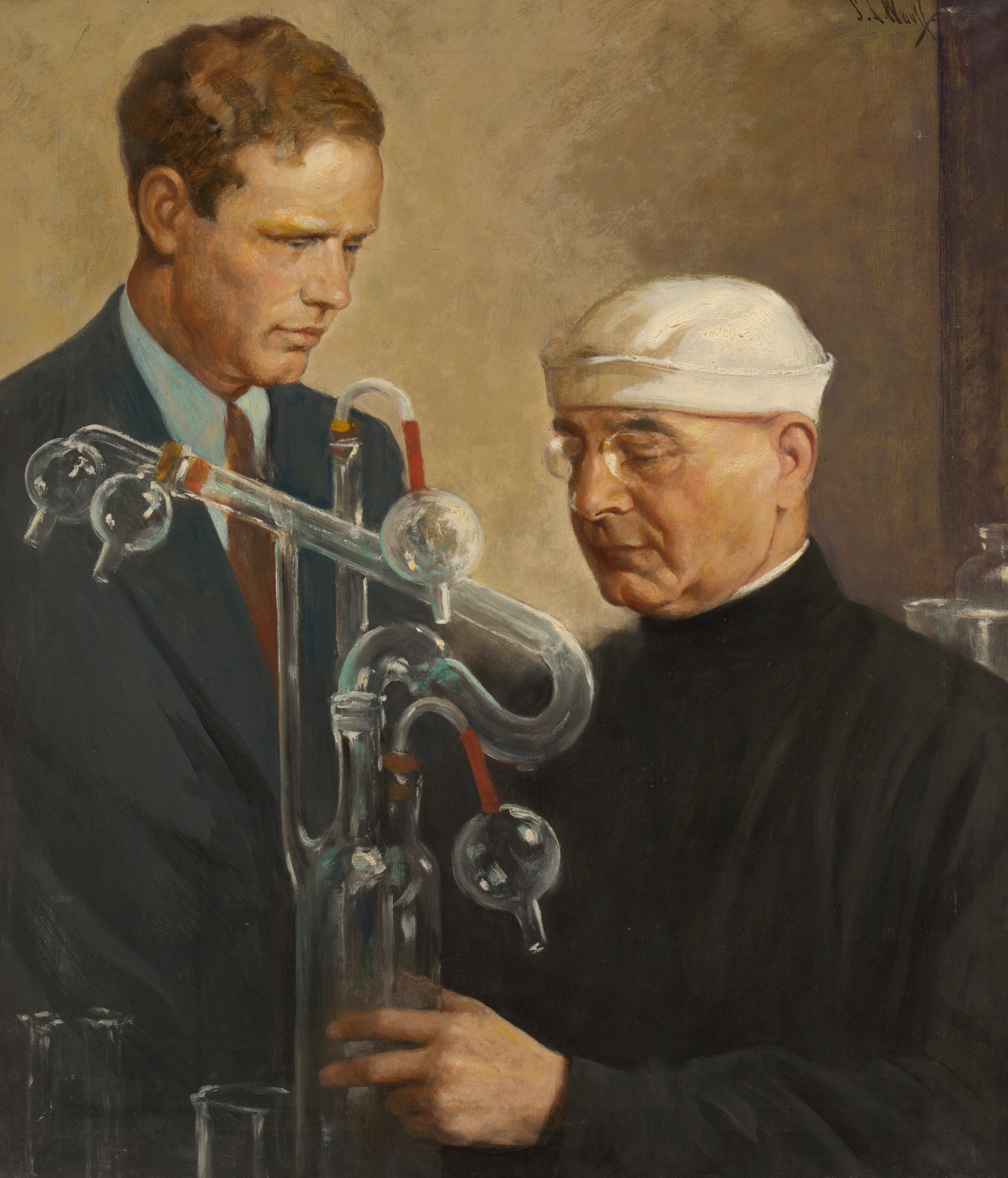
Portrait of Charles Lindbergh (left) and Alexis Carrel with their perfusion apparatus (1938)

In 1935, French surgeon Alexis Carrel and American aviator Charles Lindbergh announced the first closed, sterile perfusion pump. The glass-enclosed, three-chamber device maintained a flow of oxygenated perfusate through explanted animal thyroid glands, keeping them viable for up to three weeks in vitro. Their fragments were then transferred to culture flasks, where they gave rise to proliferating cell colonies, verifying ex vivo viability. The apparatus showed that, by equalizing pressure and continuously recirculating the medium, organs could be kept viable outside the body for extended periods. In 1953, American surgeon John Heysham Gibbon successfully used a heart–lung machine during open-heart surgery on a human patient, which showed that an artificial circuit with controlled oxygenation and temperature could temporarily maintain systemic circulation. During the 20th century, ex vivo techniques were adapted for a range of animal models. A notable one was the development of the working heart model, in which perfusate enters the left atrium and exits through the aorta, more closely replicating physiological flow conditions. Advances in instrumentation enabled detailed assessments of cardiac function, including pressure–volume relationships, oxygen consumption, and myocardial contractility. The artificial organ field was particularly influential in the advancement of ex vivo models; the development of hemodialysis, for example, relied on a series of models designed to test and support extracorporeal (outside the body) circulation technologies.

== Ethical and legal aspects ==
Some ex vivo models may offer ethical benefits by reducing reliance on live-animal experimentation relative to in vivo approaches, enabling researchers to conduct physiologically relevant studies without using whole, living organisms. In certain cases, animals already intended for slaughter may be used as tissue sources. The Langendorff heart preparation requires the use of live animals, as it involves the excision and immediate perfusion of the heart to preserve viability for experimental analysis; however, adaptations of the technique can reduce the number of animals needed for certain protocols by enabling multiple experimental applications from a single specimen.

Human tissues for ex vivo models are typically obtained from clinical procedures, such as surgical discards, donations, biopsies, or through accredited biobanks. Tissues obtained shortly after death through autopsy are used in some cases, particularly for studies focused on maintaining structural integrity or assessing short-term functional properties. Although human tissues provide the highest degree of physiological relevance, their use is subject to inter-sample heterogeneity (e.g., age, gender, medication history, and diet), logistical challenges in obtaining region-specific samples, and ethical constraints. In many jurisdictions worldwide, the acquisition and research use of human tissues are regulated by ethical and legal frameworks that require informed consent. In Japan, the Ethical Guidelines for Medical and Biological Research Involving Human Subjects (人を対象とする生命科学・医学系研究に関する倫理指針), implemented in 2021, consolidate previous standards and mandate that researchers obtain informed consent when conducting studies involving human tissues. In Switzerland, the Federal Act on Research involving Human Beings (Human Research Act, HRA) stipulates that all research involving identifiable human tissue must be approved by an ethics committee. Researchers are required to obtain written informed consent from donors, and documentation concerning the origin of the tissue and the consent procedure must be submitted as part of the ethical review process.

In the United Kingdom, the legal framework governing the removal, storage, and use of human tissue for research varies by jurisdiction. In England, Wales, and Northern Ireland, the Human Tissue Act 2004 mandates that appropriate consent must be obtained for the removal and use of tissue from both the living and the deceased, unless specific statutory exemptions apply. The Act includes provisions introduced in response to public health scandals in the 1990s, such as the Alder Hey and Bristol Royal Infirmary cases, in which thousands of children's organs were retained without parental knowledge. In Scotland, the Human Tissue (Scotland) Act 2006 regulates the removal, retention, and use of human tissue for purposes including transplantation and research. Unlike the 2004 Act, which relies on "appropriate consent", the Scottish legislation is based on the principle of "authorisation" as the legal basis for the use of human tissue. The 2006 Act was subsequently amended by the Human Tissue (Authorisation) (Scotland) Act 2019, which introduced a system of deemed authorisation for organ and tissue donation after death. In Wales, the Human Transplantation (Wales) Act 2013 further diverged by introducing a system of deemed consent for post-mortem organ and tissue donation.

In the United States, federal regulations such as the Common Rule and those enforced by the Food and Drug Administration (FDA) stipulate that researchers must obtain informed consent when conducting studies involving human subjects, including the use of identifiable biological materials. The Health Insurance Portability and Accountability Act (HIPAA) protects the confidentiality of personal health information, including data derived from tissue samples.

== See also ==
- List of medical roots, suffixes and prefixes
- Neoclassical compound – Compound words composed from Latin or ancient Greek
