= Langendorf =

Langendorf may refer to:

== Places ==
- Langendorf, Bavaria, Germany
- Langendorf, Saxony-Anhalt, Germany
- Langendorf, Lower Saxony, Germany
- Langendorf, Switzerland
- Wielowieś, Silesian Voivodeship (German: Langendorf), Poland
- Langendorf, a former village now in Săcele, Romania

== People ==
- Maik Langendorf (born 1972), Austrian darts player
- Antonie Langendorf (1894–1969), German activist and politician
- Kurt Langendorf (1920–2011), German opponent of Nazis

== See also ==
- Oskar Langendorff (1853–1908), German physician
- Langendorff heart, a medical technique used with animals
- Johnnie Langendorff, figure in the 2017 Sutherland Springs church shooting
