= Ex vivo lung perfusion =

Donor lung preservation technique

Ex-vivo lung perfusion conduct on a rat

Ex vivo lung perfusion (abbreviated EVLP) is a form of machine perfusion aimed at sustaining the active aerobic cellular metabolism of donor lungs outside the donor's body prior to lung transplantation. This medical preservation technique typically occurs within a specialised machine engineered to mimic the conditions of the natural circulatory system. The machine supplies the lung with perfusate and ventilates it using a protective mechanical ventilator under human body temperature. This allows the delivery of essential nutrients and oxygen to the donor lung, supporting metabolic functions and allowing for prolonged preservation up to 17 hours. The three major EVLP protocols at present are the Toronto protocol, Lund protocol, and Organ Care System protocol. These EVLP protocols can be effective in rendering initially rejected donor lungs suitable for transplantation through reassessment and damage repair, thus widening the donor lung pools.

== Physiology ==
Gas exchange in the alveolus

The primary function of the lungs is to facilitate gas exchange, supplying oxygen to the bloodstream while removing carbon dioxide from the blood. This process occurs in the alveoli, tiny air sacs where oxygen and carbon dioxide move between the lungs and blood through a thin barrier.

Perfusion in lung physiology refers to the passage of blood through the pulmonary circulation, where it comes in close contact with the alveolar air. The efficiency of gas exchange is significantly influenced by the distribution and adequacy of blood flow, or perfusion, to various parts of the lungs. In a healthy lung, perfusion is optimally matched with ventilation (airflow), ensuring efficient gas exchange.

In vivo lung perfusion occurs within the living organism and is tightly regulated by various physiological mechanisms, including responses to oxygen and carbon dioxide levels. Ex vivo lung perfusion, on the other hand, is a controlled process outside the body, where donor lungs are connected to a perfusion machine. Unlike in vivo perfusion, EVLP can be adjusted to optimise conditions for lung repair and assessment without the constraints of the body's immune and coagulation systems.

== History ==
Perfusion of organs, the conceptual framework of EVLP, was first discovered by Alexis Carrel and Charles Lindbergh in the 1930. Their pioneering experiments spanned various organs (heart, kidney, thyroid, ovary, adrenal glands, and spleen), laying the groundwork for organ preservation through perfusion. Lung perfusion in particular was used to study pulmonary physiology from the early 1990s.

Stig Steen and his team demonstrated the first clinical application of EVLP at the University Hospital of Lund in 2001. The team's objective was to evaluate the quality of lungs obtained from a non-heart-beating donor through EVLP. During EVLP, the metabolic activities in the lungs were continuously monitored. Following a reassessment that confirmed its suitability as a donor lung, the lung underwent transplantation. According to Steen's team, the recipient experienced "good" lung function during the initial five months of follow-up.

Steen's team then attempted to improve the quality of donor lungs that were initially rejected for transplantation using EVLP. The team acquired nine initially rejected donor lungs and reconditioned them through short-period EVLP according to the Lund protocol. Subsequent reassessment concluded that six of the nine lungs became apt for transplantation, and all six recipients of the reconditioned lungs survived for three months. Successful reconditioning cases of rejected lungs through EVLP provided evidences that EVLP can be effective in improving the viability of donated lungs.

Later, the Toronto group refined Lund protocol by introducing the concept of extended EVLP. The Toronto protocol enabled the delivery of treatment at normothermia, i.e., body temperature. Furthermore, portable EVLP called the Organ Care System (OCS) protocol was developed by an American biotechnology company TransMedics. OCS allows the assessments of the donor lungs during organ transportation. At present, the majority of transplant programs utilise either the Toronto or OCS Lung protocol, and some incorporate these techniques with further adaptations.

== Procedure ==
=== Toronto Protocol ===
The Toronto Protocol is currently one of the most widely adopted EVLP protocol, esteemed for its established performance and safety record.

==== Eligibility criteria ====
Both lungs obtained from brain death donors and donors after cardiac death undergo the Toronto protocol if they meet the listed eligibility criteria. The selection process involves a preliminary assessment of the lung's condition through imaging, bronchoscopy, and gas exchange measurements.

Donor lungs exhibiting insufficient oxygenation, as indicated by a PaO_{2}/FiO_{2} ratio below 300 mmHg, due to factors such as infection or aspiration, are subject to re-evaluation and conditioning through EVLP to improve their suitability for transplantation. However, some donor lungs with extreme damages were often excluded from assessment across various clinical studies.

Following is the current eligibility criteria for Toronto protocol.

- Best PaO_{2}/FiO_{2} is less than 300 mmHg.
- Signs of pulmonary oedema either on chest X-ray or physical examination at the donor site.
- Poor lung compliance during examination at procurement operation.
- High-risk history, such as more than 10 units of blood transfusion or questionable history of aspiration.
- Donation after cardiac death with more than 60 min interval from withdrawal life support to cardiac arrest interval.

==== Apparatus ====
Toronto protocol is a low flow strategy that targets to reach 40% of the expected cardiac output to reduce the likelihood of oedema formation. To avoid haemolysis, the Toronto Protocol opts for the use of an acellular perfusate rather than the blood-based perfusate containing red blood cells. Extracorporeal membrane oxygenation (ECMO) machine is frequently used as a protective ventilator, and centrifugal pumps are used to pump the perfusates.

==== Procedures ====
First, surgical tubes called cannulas are inserted into the pulmonary artery and left atrium, followed by intubation of the trachea or main bronchus. The EVLP circuit is then primed with a solution containing methylprednisolone (steroid), heparin, and antibiotics. Next, the lung is connected to the EVLP circuit and ventilator. Perfusion is initiated at a low flow rate, gradually increasing to the target flow of 40%. Meanwhile, the perfusate temperature is raised to normothermia. Ventilation begins once the perfusate reaches 37˚C, with some adjustments made to ensure adequate circulation and ventilation. Throughout the process, the lung's condition is closely monitored to optimise its function for transplantation.

=== Lund Protocol ===
The Lund protocol is the first high-functioning EVLP protocol introduced by Steen from the University Hospital in Lund in 2000.

==== Eligibility criteria ====
The Lund protocol reconsiders donor lungs that were initially deemed unsuitable for transplantation. The exclusion criteria of the Lund protocol are the presence of any severe lung damages, malignant cells except brain tumours, and signs of hepatitis and HIV.

==== Apparatus ====
The Lund protocol utilises a roller pump, blood-based perfusate, and an ECMO ventilator. Red blood cells account for 14% of the Steen perfusate–that is, haematocrit level is kept at 14%. The Lund protocol achieves a complete target flow, which is 100% of the cardiac output. This level of flow parallels the post-perfusion conditions encountered by transplanted lungs.

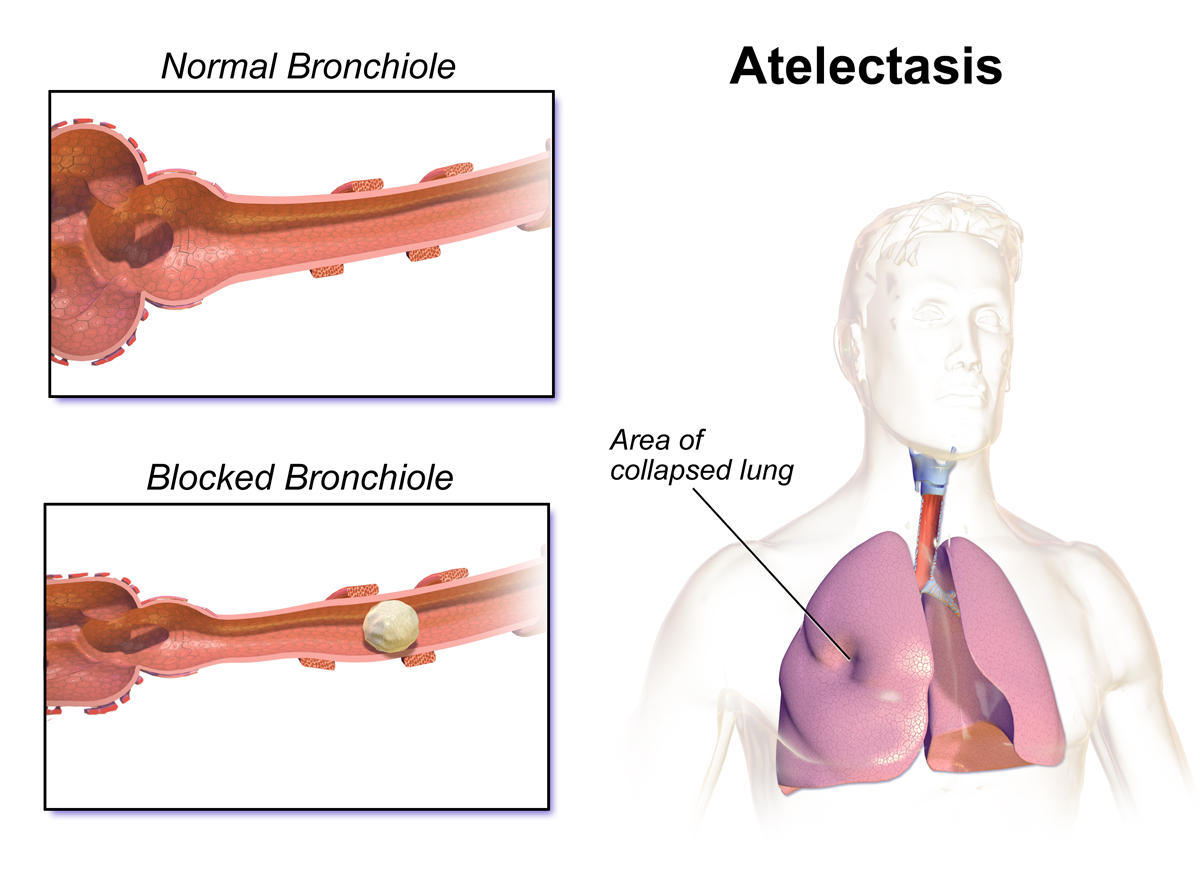
Atelectasis: normal vs. blocked bronchiole

==== Procedures ====
In the Lund protocol, the main procedures involve reconditioning and assessment. During the reconditioning phase, various measures are taken to improve lung function. This includes recruiting atelectasis–partial collapses of the lungs, controlling inflammation using a leukocyte filter, circulating antimicrobials and glucocorticoids during perfusion, which typically lasts for 1 to 2 hours. After the reconditioning phase, the lungs undergo assessment to evaluate their suitability for transplantation. If the lungs meet the necessary standards, they proceed to preparation for transplant. However, if the reconditioning results are unsatisfactory, perfusion continues to provide the lungs with additional time for recovery. Should inadequate reconditioning persist, the donor lung is considered unsuitable and is subsequently discarded.

=== The Organ Care System Protocol ===
The Organ Care System (OCS) protocol is the first portable EVLP system designed to assess the donor lung functionality during the transportation of donated organs.

==== Apparatus ====
The OCS protocol utilises a blood-based perfusate, ventilator, and pumps. Similar to the Lund protocol, the OCS protocol employs a blood-based perfusate but with a higher haematocrit level ranging from 15-25%. Bellows pump is used for ventilation, and pulsatile pump is used for perfusion. The target flow of the OCS protocol ranges from 2 to 2.5 litres per minute. Organ Care System™ by Transmedics is currently the only commercially available EVLP devices that adopts the OCS protocol.

==== Significance ====
In both the Toronto and Lund systems, the donor lung is subject to low temperature cryopreservation from the point of harvest until it is linked to the EVLP circuit upon arrival at the recipient's hospital. This cryopreservation period adds to the cold ischaemia time, which, if prolonged, can lead to substantial lung injury in the recipient, potentially resulting in transplant rejection. OCS protocol could minimise the cold ischaemia time, as the OCS lungs are kept at 37˚C throughout the entire ex vivo ventilation and perfusion process.

==== Outcomes ====
On one hand, study findings indicate that lungs preserved with the OCS protocol demonstrate short-term outcomes similar to those preserved using standard cold storage techniques. On the other hand, the study suggests that long-term mortality rates might be notably lower among recipients who receive lungs preserved with the OCS protocol compared to those preserved via standard cold storage methods. It is noted by researchers that further investigation into the outcomes associated with the OCS protocol is needed.

== Advantages and implications ==
=== Reconditioning once-rejected donor lungs ===
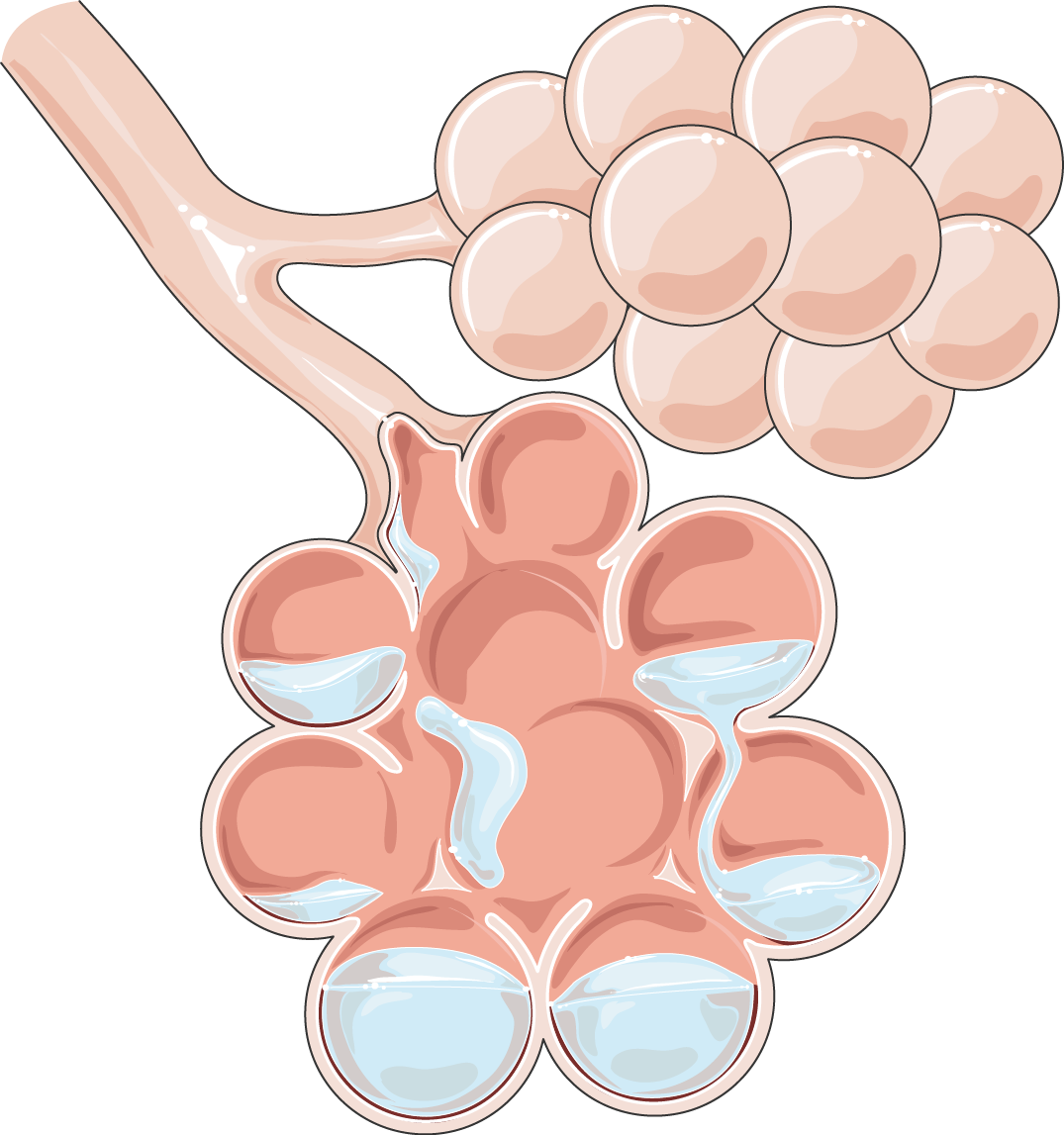
Pulmonary oedema

EVLP can be useful in the reconditioning of lungs affected by pulmonary oedema, trauma, or infection. It is particularly beneficial for lungs with borderline function or prolonged ischaemic times.

Alveolar collapse or fluid buildup in lungs often cause atelectasis, which results in reduced gas exchange. EVLP addresses this issue by mechanically ventilating the lungs, thereby inflating the collapsed parts.

Inflammation and infection are prevalent complications with donor lungs. To mitigate these issues, EVLP facilitates the direct administration of anti-inflammatory drugs and antibiotics into the lung's blood vessels. This intervention aids in reducing inflammation, treating existing infections, and thereby improving the health and functionality of the lung before transplantation.

Furthermore, an aggressive protocol with EVLP can enable the transplantation of some previously rejected donor lungs. These lungs typically exhibit atelectasis and a low PaO2/FiO2 ratio. Through the use of EVLP, these lungs can be rehabilitated and deemed suitable for transplantation, thus expanding the pool of viable donor lungs.

=== Improving transplantation outcomes ===
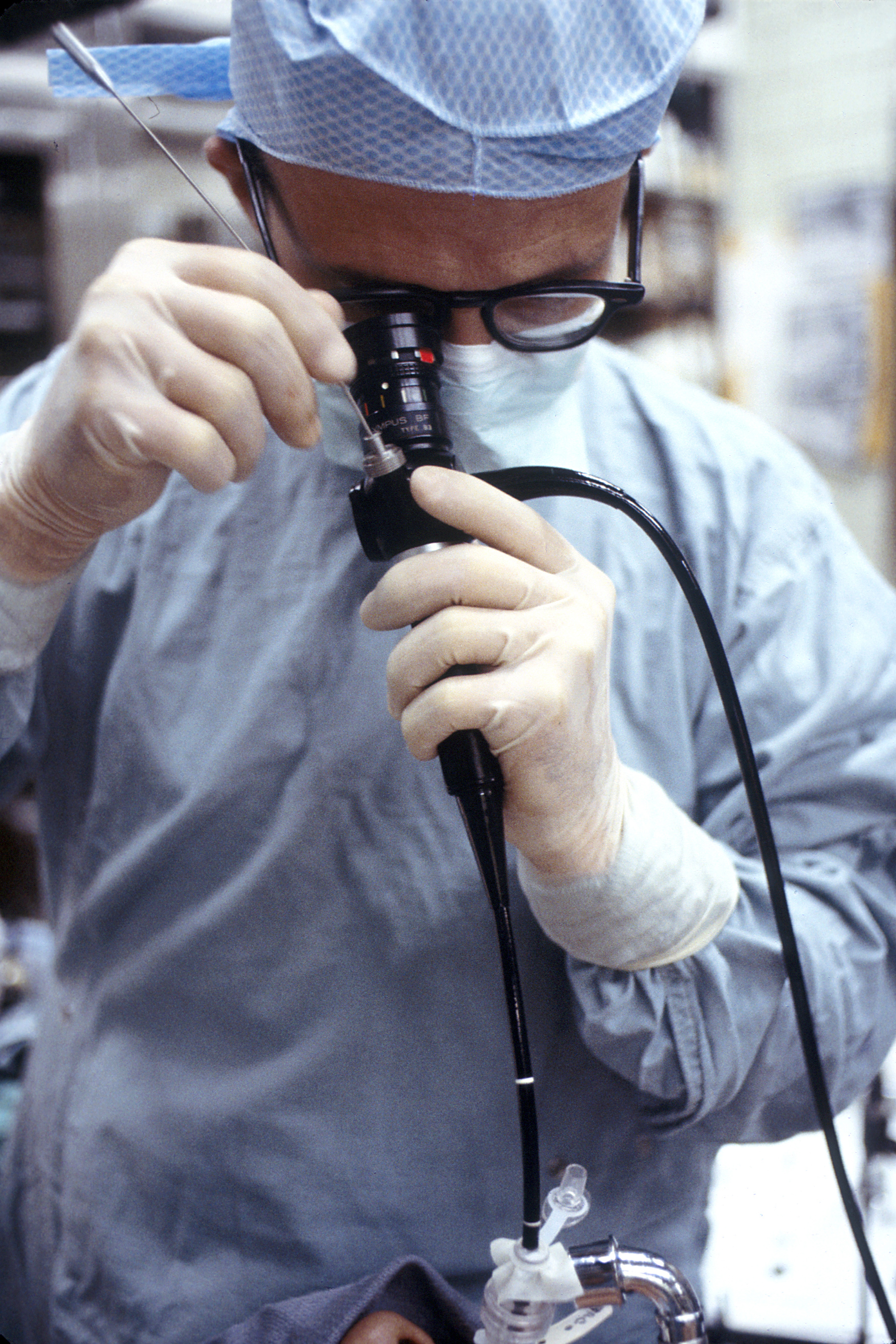
Bronchoscopy in action

EVLP ensures the viability of lungs from high-risk donors for transplantation, optimising lung utilisation and improving transplant outcomes. Patients who received EVLP-treated lungs showed excellent short-term and long-term survival rates, alongside improved graft function. These recipients had comparable, if not superior, survival rates and function compared to those transplanted using conventional methods. Additionally, the use of EVLP has been associated with a reduction in the incidence of primary graft dysfunction, a fatal complication following lung transplantation. During the EVLP process, a bronchoscope is used to remove any secretions or blockages in the rejected donor lungs. This procedure enhances post-transplantation breathing capabilities.

Through rehabilitation and detailed assessment of once rejected donor lungs, EVLP can expand the donor lung pool. This technique's potential to improve the quality and increase the availability of donor lungs underscores its significance in the field of lung transplantation.

== Risks and complications ==
=== Inflammatory responses ===
As the donor lung comes into close contact with the circuit materials during EVLP, its exposure to pro-inflammatory conditions is inevitable. Studies have shown that EVLP induces a significant up-regulation of inflammation-related genes like microribonucleic acid (miR)-17 and miR-548b. Moreover, increase in the production of inflammation-inducing cytokines over time in the EVLP perfusate was reported. Targeting these inflammatory pathways prior to or during EVLP could be necessary to minimise the risk of inflammatory responses-triggered organ rejection.

=== Ventilator-induced lung injuries ===
EVLP has a potential to trigger ventilator-induced lung injury (VILI) due to the use of mechanical ventilators for air flows into the donor lung, possibly resulting in irreversible functional or structural damage. The most commonly used ventilation protocol in EVLP nowadays is positive-pressure ventilation (PPV) protocol, which carries a higher risk of inducing VILI compared to other protocols like negative-pressure ventilation (NPV). Some attempts have been made to modify the protocol to NPV, and preclinical trials support that NPV protocol can be equally effective in EVLP. Yet, further clinical validation is warranted by the researchers to validate this intervention.

=== Economic challenges ===
According to a multi-centre observational study, the expenses associated with EVLP were significantly greater compared to the conventional lung transplantation. The high cost was attributed to the costly operation machine, frequent replacement of the perfusate, and prolonged length of stay in intensive care unit. While the cost of training transplant staff on EVLP may contribute to the overall expenses, the exact cost of incorporating EVLP remains unclear due to the absence of standardised guidelines for EVLP.

== See also ==
- Lung Transplantation
- Machine Perfusion
- Organ Donation / Organ Transplantation
