= Physiological relevance =

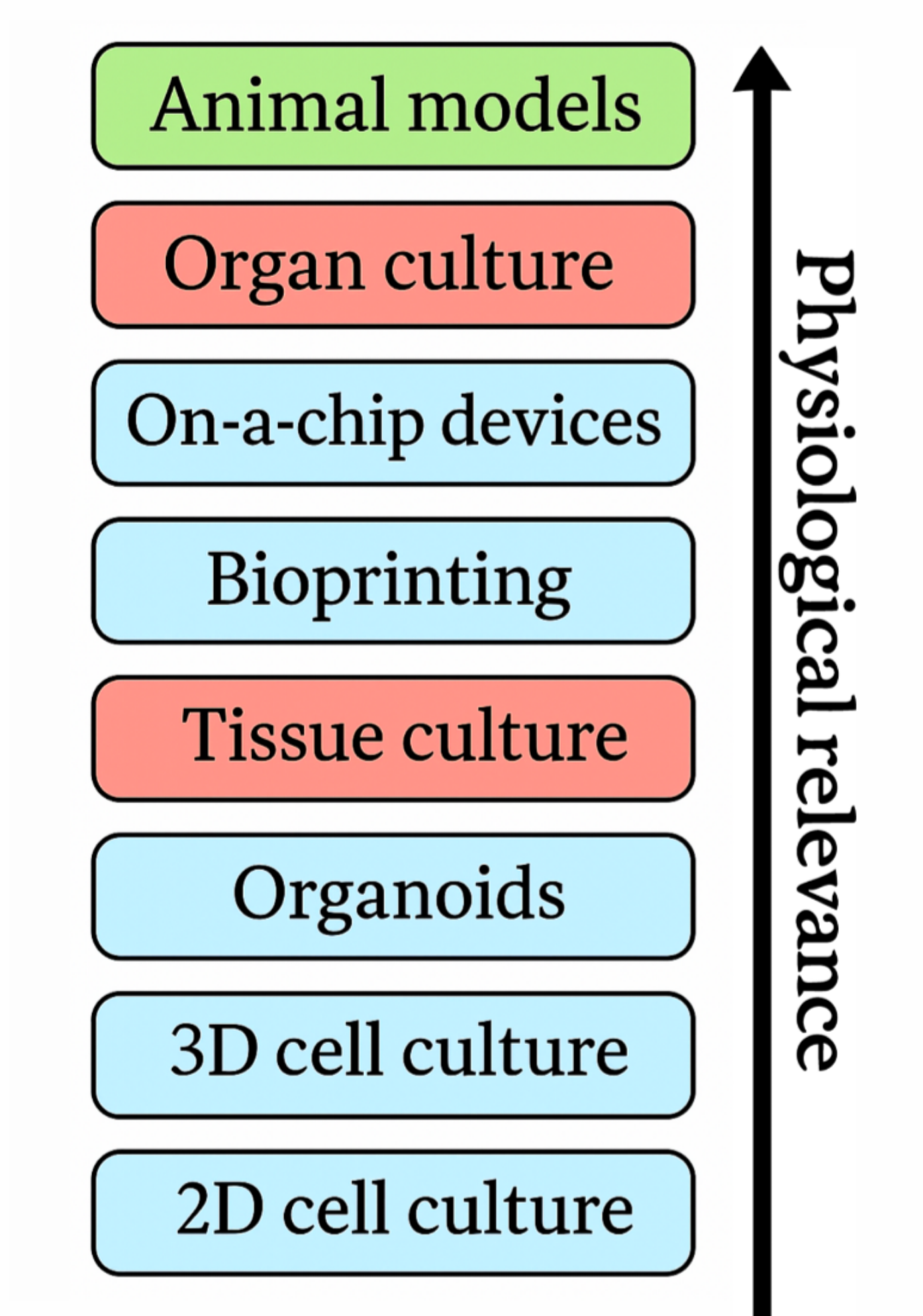
Experimental models color-coded to indicate classification as in vivo (green), ex vivo (red), or in vitro (blue), and arranged in ascending order of physiological relevance, based on the criteria proposed by Klein and Hutmacher (2024)

Physiological relevance is a scientific concept that refers to the applicability or significance of a particular experimental finding or biological observation in the context of normal bodily functions. This concept is often used in biomedical research, where scientists strive to design experiments that not only yield statistically significant results but also have direct implications for understanding human health and disease.

== Importance in biomedical research ==
Physiological relevance is a critical factor in biomedical research because it helps to bridge the gap between basic science and clinical application. Researchers aim to design studies that not only yield statistically significant results but also have direct implications for understanding human health and disease. For example, a study on the effects of a new drug on cancer cells in a lab dish might show promising results. However, these findings would only be considered physiologically relevant if the drug also demonstrated efficacy in animal models or clinical trials, where the complex interplay of various bodily systems and processes are taken into account.

== Examples ==
A classic example of physiological relevance is the discovery of insulin. In the early 20th century, scientists found that injecting diabetic dogs with extracts from the pancreas of healthy dogs could normalize their blood sugar levels. This finding was not only statistically significant but also physiologically relevant, as it led to the development of insulin therapy for diabetes in humans.

In tissue engineering, physiological relevance means that living tissue constructs in vitro are morphologically and functionally similar to native tissue. Bioengineering approaches to modify the mechanical properties of scaffolds and functionalize materials with growth factors or gene therapeutics.

== Challenges ==
One of the main challenges in ensuring physiological relevance is the inherent complexity of biological systems. Many factors can influence the outcome of an experiment, from the genetic makeup of the test subjects to the specific conditions under which the experiment is conducted. Furthermore, what is physiologically relevant in one species may not be in another, making it difficult to extrapolate findings from animal models to humans.

Another challenge is that physiological relevance is not always easy to quantify. Unlike statistical significance, which can be calculated using well-established mathematical formulas, physiological relevance often requires a more subjective, holistic assessment of the data. A limited number of quantitative models have been applied to improve the physiological relevance of biological systems.
