= Antonie Langendorf =

German politician (1894–1969)

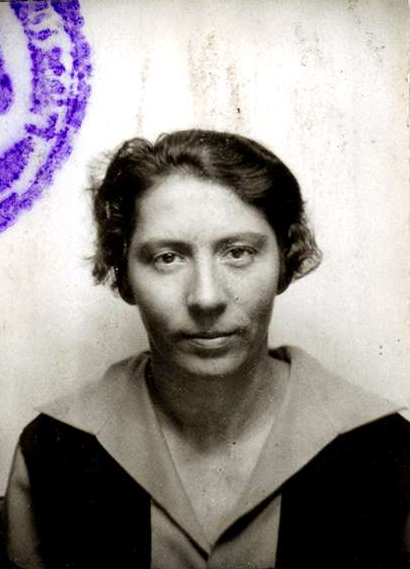
- Antonie Langendorf in 1929.
- Born: Anette Glanzmann; 3 January 1894; Leipzig, Saxony, Germany
- Died: 23 June 1969 (aged 75); Mannheim, Baden-Württemberg, West Germany
- Occupations: Political activist Politician; Concentration Camp survivor
- Political party: SPD; USPD; KPD
- Spouse: Rudolf Langendorf (1894-1942)
- Children: Kurt Langendorf (1920-2011); Hans Langendorf

Antonie Langendorf (born Anette Glanzmann: 3 January 1894 – 23 June 1969) was a German political activist and politician (SPD, USPD, KPD).

== Life ==
Anette Glanzmann was born in Leipzig. She attended junior and middle schools locally before obtaining clerical work. In 1910 she relocated to Mülhausen, at that time in the extreme southwest of Germany, where her father worked as a senior trades union official. 1910 was also the year in which she joined the Social Democratic Party ("Sozialdemokratische Partei Deutschlands" / SPD), which had been permitted to participate in national elections since 1890, but was nevertheless still regarded by most members of the mainstream political establishment as an extreme left-wing organisation. She moved again in 1914, crossing the river to nearby Lörrach where she took a job with the AOK (health insurance mutual insurance operation). It was while in Lörrach that she met Rudolf Langendorf with whom she would share her life till his execution in 1942. The two of them married, though it is not clear whether they did this before or after they moved away from Lörrach.

During the revolutionary turmoil that followed military defeat, Rudolf Langendorf participated in the Soldiers' and Workers' councils. The two of them were among the co-founders of the Lörrach Communist Party branch in 1919/1920. By 1921 they had two sons, and the family relocated to Friedrichsfeld, a suburb of Mannheim. During the next few years Rudolf Langendorf was sentenced, in 1925, to three years imprisonment in connection with his role in the political unrest in the region. While he was away Antonie kept the family afloat, working as a contributing editor with the "Mannheimer Arbeiterzeitung" ("Mannheim Workers' Newspaper").

The political backdrop changed dramatically in January 1933 when the Nazis took power and converted Germany into a one-party dictatorship. Political activity (except in support of the Nazi party) became illegal. In 1933/34 Antonie Langendorf was taken into "protective custody". On her release she fled to Switzerland, but she then returned to Germany and continued her now illegal party activities and communist resistance work. In 1942 the Langendorfs were both arrested in connection with the betrayal of the Lechleiter Group, in which her husband was a leading figure. Antonie Langendorf was released, but her husband was executed on 15 September 1942. Three days after that Antonie Langendorf was re-arrested and by December 1944 she had been interned in the Ravensbrück concentration camp. Their son Kurt Langendorf, by now aged 22, was allocated to a Punishment squadron (but survived the experience).

== Politics ==
During the war, which lasted from 1914 to 1918, the SPD split, primarily over the issue of whether or not to continue supporting Reichstag votes to finance the war. Antonie joined the breakaway Independent Social Democratic Party ("Unabhängige Sozialdemokratische Partei Deutschlands" / USPD). Joining the Communist Party in 1919/20 was part of another party split, this time within the USPD. During the early 1920s she was politically active in Friedrichsfeld. With rapid growth during the 1920s Friedrichsfeld was administratively subsumed into Mannheim, and during the later 1920s sources show Antonie Langendorf as a Communist Party activist in Mannheim. By 1929 she was the leader of the women's section of the Mannheim regional communist party, as a result of which she was on the party's candidate list for regional elections: between 1929 and 1933 she sat as a member of the regional legislature ("Landtag") for Baden. From 1930 she was also a member of the Communist Party regional leadership team ("Bezirksleitung") for Baden.

War ended in May 1945 and she was released from the concentration camp. Germany was now divided into military occupation zones. Mannheim was in the US occupation zone which was part of the territory that would be relaunched in May 1949, as the German Federal Republic (West Germany). During the later 1940s the military occupation forces sponsored preparations for a return to democracy. Antonie Langendorf rejoined the Communist party in 1945, becoming the women's section leader in Baden. With the subsequent redrawing of regional boundaries she later took on the same post in respect of the Mannheim region. From 1946 she was a member of the regional "pre-parliament", and a member of the Constitutional Regional Committee, responsible for drafting a new regional constitution.

On 1 October 1947 she took over the seat of Jakob Ritter in the new regional parliament ("Landtag") who had resigned his seat because of an internal party conflict (while remaining a member of the Communist Party). She was also a member of the Communist Party regional executive. During the 1950s, following the brutal suppression of an uprising in East Germany, Cold War tensions intensified, and in 1956 the Communist Party was banned in what was now West Germany. Slightly unusually, it was accepted that Antonie Langendorf should continue as a member regional Landtag for several more years, now without any party affiliation. After retiring from the Landtag she remained politically engaged, joining a small resurrected German Communist Party in 1968.

== Death ==
Antonie Langendorf died in Mannheim on 23 June 1969.
