= Kurt Langendorf =

German economist (1920–2011)

Kurt Langendorf (11 September 1920 – 2 July 2011) was a German participant in political resistance during the Nazi years. After 1945, he chose an academic career, becoming a university professor and economist, while also engaging in the Union of Persecutees of the Nazi Regime ("Vereinigung der Verfolgten des Naziregimes") and its successor organisation.

== Life ==
=== Early years ===
Kurt Langendorf was born in Lörrach and grew up in the Mannheim area. His parents, Rudolf Langendorf (1894–1942) and Antonie Langendorf (1894–1969) were both founder members of the Communist Party. According to one source Kurt Langendorf received his name to honour Kurt Eisner, the murdered leader of the short-lived Munich Soviet Republic. Kurt and his brother, Hans, became conscious of their parents' activism at an early age: their childhood was a politicised one.

=== Nazi years ===
In January 1933, when Kurt Langendorf was 12, the Nazis took power. His father was taken into "protective custody" in March 1933 and his mother soon afterwards. They were both released during (or possibly before) 1935 and restored their contacts with "fellow antifascists". Kurt Langendorf was able to take and pass his school final exams (Abitur). The authorities attempted to "turn him politically", but subsequent research in Gestapo files indicate an awareness that he had not been "turned". He is identified in Gestapo reports of the time as a "dog that takes orders from Moscow" ("ein moskauhöriger Hund"), but evidently the authorities had no sufficient evidence to proceed actively against him. In fact, he exhibited practical and valuable skills, constructing and maintaining radio receivers enabling his parents and their political associates to listen (illegally) to broadcasts transmitted from London and Moscow. He also led a form of double life, acting as a courier, taking messages to Switzerland, where his mother had relatives.

World War II broke out a few days after his nineteenth birthday. In 1940 Kurt Langendorf was conscripted into the Wehrmacht and for a time seriously contemplated escaping across the Swiss border and seeking refuge with relatives. He was persuaded by comrades to respond positively to the call-up, however, in order to acquire military knowledge and pursue antifascist political work with fellow soldiers.

Sources state that he undertook anti-Nazi resistance work in the army without spelling out what this involved. However, his father was arrested in February 1942, sentenced in May 1942 and, on 15 September 1942, executed. Three days later his mother was re-arrested and taken into custody. Kurt Langendorfer himself was identified as "politically unreliable" and transferred to a punishment squadron. In July 1943, caught up in the Battle of Kursk, he attempted to cross over and join the Red Army. Langendorf was shot and rendered unconscious: after the front line had rolled back and forth for several days he was found by German soldiers and taken to the field hospital. The surgeon who extracted the bullet advised him to retain it: it came from a German revolver. (It was only in much later, in 1990, that he discovered that army records of the time had reported him as dead.) By the end of 1944, after further military service, he found himself before a military court following further various malfeasances and was sentenced to a further five years in a punishment squadron. One of his misdemeanours had been to announce to an aristocratic senior officer, during a training course for junior officers, that the Second World War would be won by Germany because Goebbels, the government propaganda minister, was the greater liar.

Early in 1945, as the German army fell apart, he made a successful escape. He was captured by American soldiers and spent two months in the infamous concentration camp at Bad Kreuznach. Nevertheless, he had survived the war, as had his mother, who had spent the final months of the war in the Ravensbrück concentration camp, and now returned to Mannheim. His father had been executed and his brother Hans had been shot dead while trying to change sides. For Kurt Langendorf, still aged only 24, it was time for a new start.

=== After the war ===
Langendorf now set about obtaining a university place to study engineering at Karlsruhe, not far from his mother's Mannheim home. Karlsruhe rejected his application. Buchenwald survivors now invited him to enroll at Jena to study Physics. He accepted the invitation, although he soon switched to Economics. Moving to Jena meant moving to the Soviet occupation zone - relaunched in October 1949 as the German Democratic Republic - which is where he lived and worked till his retirement in 1985.

As a citizen of the Soviet occupation zone Langendorf became a member of the Union of Persecutees of the Nazi Regime ("Vereinigung der Verfolgten des Naziregimes") subsequently relaunched as the Anti-fascist league (" Bund der Antifaschistinnen und Antifaschisten"). He also joined the Socialist Unity Party ("Sozialistische Einheitspartei Deutschlands" / SED), launched under questionable circumstances in April 1946, and by October 1949 widely seen as the ruling party in a new kind of one-party German dictatorship. He received his first degree in 1951. After this he remained at Jena through most of the 1950s, teaching political economics and, by 1954, as the Director of an Institute at the university. In 1954 he embarked on a two year study visit to China. This formed the basis for his doctoral dissertation on the socialist transformation of capitalist industry during the change-over period to socialism in the People's Republic of China. His oral defence of his work and subsequent award of the doctorate followed on 15 May 1959. The doctorate was awarded not by his university but by the Party Central Committee's Academy for Social Sciences. In 1965 he received his habilitation (higher academic qualification) from the Humboldt University of Berlin, where by now he was teaching, and where in 1964 he had been given a teaching chair. His dissertation, on this occasion, concerned wages theory and planning in the new economic system ("Zur Theorie des Lohnes und der Lohnplanung im neuen ökonomischen System") His full professorship at the followed in 1968. Subsequently he took also a professorship with the "Fritz Heckert trades union college" in Bernau bei Berlin, where he continued to work till his retirement in 1985.

Retirement left more time for activities involving former victims of the Nazi regime. He joined the local committee of the East German antifascist resistance fighters in Berlin-Weißensee. After the demise of the separate East German state, in 1990 he was a co-founder of the "Berlin Association of former participants in Anti-fascist Resistance, victims and survivors of Nazi persecution" ("Berliner Vereinigung ehemaliger Teilnehmer am antifaschistischen Widerstand, Verfolgter des Naziregimes und Hinterbliebener" / B. V. VdN), and he took on its chairmanship in 2004. He gave s succession of newspaper interviews, always keen to deal with the background and causes of German fascism.

Kurt Langendorf died in Berlin on 2 July 2011.
