= Retrograde perfusion =

Retrograde perfusion (retroperfusion) is an artificial method of providing blood supply to an organ by delivering oxygenated blood through the veins. It may be performed during surgery that interrupts the normal arterial supply of blood to that organ.

For instance, when performing surgery that interrupts the cerebral arteries, a hose placed into the femoral artery and the superior vena cava can redirect blood up the internal jugular vein to supply the brain.

This technique was pioneered by Oscar Langendorff, who perfused mamallian hearts ex vivo for research applications. Thus, it is often called Langendorff perfusion.

== See also ==
- Langendorff heart
- Perfusion
- Isolated organ perfusion technique
