= Langendorff heart =

Preparation technique for ex vivo experiments

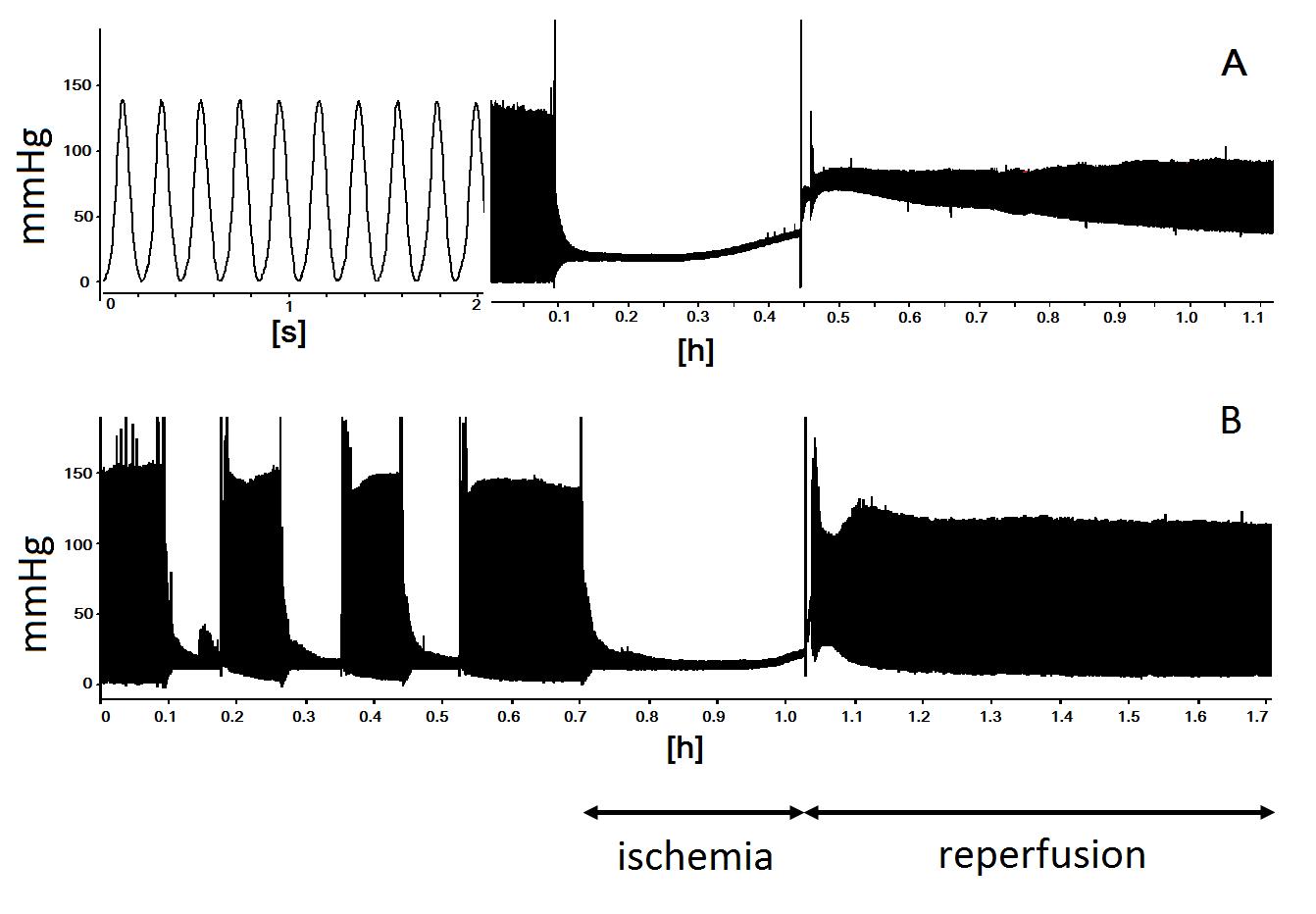
Native records of contractile activity of the left ventricle of isolated rat heart perfused under Langendorff technique. Curve A - contractile function of the heart is greatly depressed after ischemia-reperfusion. Curve B - a set of short ischemic episodes (ischemic preconditioning) before prolonged ischemia provides functional recovery of contractile activity of the heart at reperfusion.

The Langendorff heart or isolated perfused heart assay is an ex vivo technique used in pharmacological and physiological research using animals and also humans. Named after the German physiologist Oskar Langendorff, this technique allows the examination of cardiac contractile strength and heart rate without the complications of an intact animal or human. After more than 100 years, this method is still being used.

== Method ==
In the Langendorff preparation, the heart is removed from the animal's or human's body, severing the blood vessels; it is then perfused in a reverse fashion (retrograde perfusion) via the aorta, usually with a nutrient rich, oxygenated solution (e.g. Krebs–Henseleit solution or Tyrode's solution). The backwards pressure causes the aortic valve to shut, forcing the solution into the coronary vessels, which normally supply the heart tissue with blood. This feeds nutrients and oxygen to the cardiac muscle, allowing it to continue beating for several hours after its removal from the animal or human. This is a useful preparation because it allows the addition of drugs (via the perfusate) and observation of their effect on the heart without the complications involved with in vivo experimentation, such as neuronal and hormonal effects from living animal or human. This preparation also allows the organ to be digested into individual cells by adding collagenase to the perfusate. This can be done before the experiment as a technique for cell harvesting, or after the experiment to measure its effects at the cellular level.

== History ==
The first isolated perfused heart was created using frog tissue in 1866.

== See also ==
- Oskar Langendorff
- Retrograde perfusion
