= Organ Care System =

The Organ Care System (OCS) is a medical device designed by Transmedics to allow donor organs to be maintained for longer periods of time prior to transplant. The system mimics the elements of human physiology and keeps organs in an environment and temperature similar to the human body. The system allows for organ preservation that last longer than the standard organ preservation method of putting organs on ice, static cold storage, which can cause cold ischemia. When put on ice, organs begin to deteriorate about three to four hours after retrieval. On the other hand, the Paragonix SherpaPak Cardiac Transport System can offer uniform cooling by suspending the donor heart in a preservation solution, and provides continuous temperature monitoring.

== Organ Care System Heart ==
A portable system designed for "extracorporeal heart perfusion, assessment, and resuscitation", the system allows for the heart to remain beating though a process of retrograde perfusion. The process involves oxygenated donor blood moves through the coronary arteries via the aorta and returns to the circuit through the pulmonary artery. Organ Care system has been successfully used in clinical practice and has demonstrated that is able to prolong the ischemic time of donors' hearts by perfusing the organ in a beating state in normothermia while allowing the surgeon to assess the quality of the donor heart before surgery. Recently, it has been successfully used in high-risk heart recipients.

== Organ Care System Lung ==
Referred to colloquially as "lung-in-a-box," the OCS Lung System, designed to mimic the human system, keeps the lungs "breathing," blood pumping through the vessels, and is kept at a human body-regulated temperature while in transportation to a donor patient.

== Organ Care System Liver ==
The OCS Liver System was granted pre-market approval by the FDA in September 2021. The system is designed to preserve the organ by keeping it at temperatures similar to a human body and maintains its function by perfusing the liver with blood, oxygen, and vital nutrients like bile salts. The device also assists in monitoring and regulating the pressure and flow of the perfusion.
