= Oskar Langendorff =

German physician and physiologist (1853–1908)

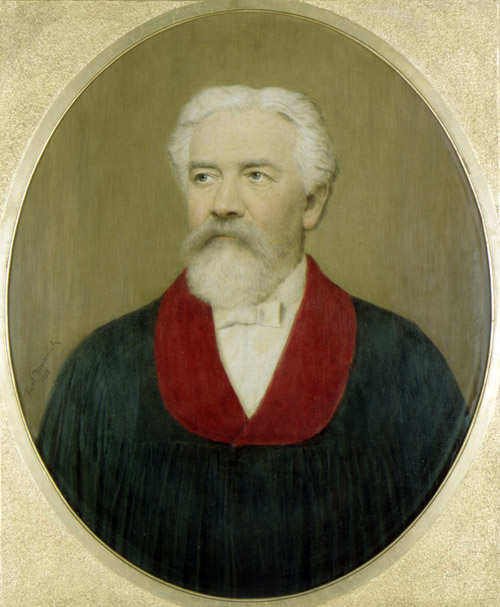
Oskar Langendorff (1913)

Oskar Langendorff (1 February 1853 in Breslau – 10 May 1908 in Rostock; his first name is sometimes given as "Oscar") was a German physician and physiologist known primarily for his experiments on the isolated perfused heart, the so-called Langendorff Heart apparatus. In addition, he is credited with discoveries in respiration and in the conduction of impulses in the sympathetic and peripheral nervous system. His work has served as the basis for the use of retrograde perfusion in science and medicine.

== Scientific career ==
After studying medicine in Wrocław (Breslau), Berlin and Freiburg im Breisgau Langendorff obtained his Ph.D. at the University of Königsberg in 1875, subsequently working there as a research assistant. He received his habilitation in 1879 with the physiologist Ludimar Hermann and after 1884 held a post as associate professor. In 1886, he was elected to membership in the German Academy of Sciences Leopoldina. From 1892 till his death in 1908 Langendorff was professor and director of the physiological institute at the University of Rostock.

== Works ==
- Physiologische Graphik. Ein leitfaden der in der physiologie gebräuchlichen registrirmethoden, a physiology manual, F. Deuticke, Leipzig: 1891. 316 pp.
- Untersuchungen am überlebenden Säugetierherzen ("Investigation of the living mammalian heart"), Pflügers Arch. 61: 291–332, 1895.
- Untersuchungen am überlebenden Säugetierherzen II. Über den Einfluss von Wärme und Kälte auf das Herz der warmblütigen Tiere ("The influence of heat and cold on the heart of warm-blooded animals"), Pflügers Arch. 66: 355–400, 1897.
- Untersuchungen am überlebenden Säugetierherzen III. Vorübergehende Unregelmässigkeiten der Herzschlages und ihre Ausgleichung ("Transient irregularities of the heartbeat, and their adjustment"), Pflügers Arch. 70: 473–486, 1898.

== Sources ==
- Taegtmeyer, H.: "One hundred years ago: Oscar Langendorff and the birth of cardiac metabolism", Can J Cardiol. Dec. 1995; 11(11): pp. 1030–5.
- Zimmer, H..: "The Isolated Perfused Heart and Its Pioneers", News Physiol Sci 13: pp. 203–210, 1998
