= Mir-548 microRNA precursor family =

mir-548

Identifiers
- Symbol: mir-548
- Rfam: RF01061
- miRBase family: MIPF0000317

Other data
- RNA type: microRNA
- Domain(s): Eukaryota;
- PDB structures: PDBe

In molecular biology mir-548 microRNA is a short RNA molecule. MicroRNAs function to regulate the expression levels of other genes by several mechanisms.

== See also ==
- MicroRNA
