= Langendorf, Bavaria =

Langendorf
- Ortsteil of Elfershausen
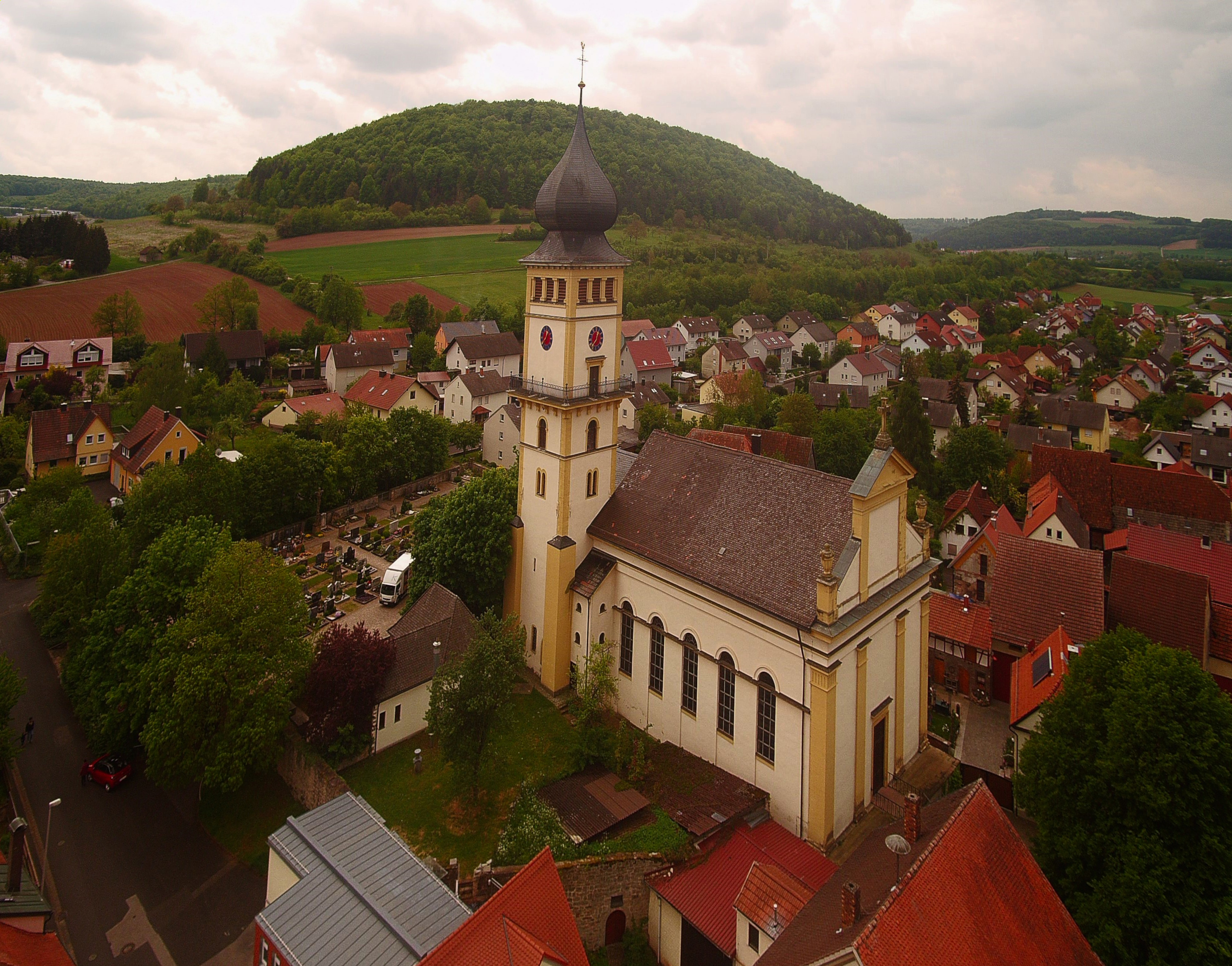
- St. Vitus' Church, Langendorf

- Coat of arms
- Interactive map of Langendorf
- Location within Germany Location within Bavaria
- Coordinates: 50.1229°N 9.9481°E
- Country: Germany
- State: Bavaria
- Municipality: Elfershausen
- Elevation: 193 m (633 ft)

Population
  - Total: 681
- Time zone: UTC+01:00 (CET)
  - Summer (DST): UTC+02:00 (CEST)
- Postal codes: 97725
- Dialling codes: 09732

Langendorf (German pronunciation: [ˈlaŋəndɔʁf]) has been part of the municipality of Elfershausen in the Lower Franconian district of Bad Kissingen since 1978. It is the mother parish for the surrounding villages.

== Location ==
The parish village (Pfarrdorf) of Langendorf is located on the Franconian Saale river, southwest of Elfershausen.

The B 287 federal road runs along the southern edge of Langendorf, leading north-east to Euerdorf and Bad Kissingen and south-west to Hammelburg. Shortly before Langendorf, it forms the Hammelburg 97 junction to the A 7 autobahn, which runs east of Langendorf in a north–south direction.

== History ==
Langendorf was first mentioned in a document in 772 as "Wintgraben" on the occasion of a donation of estates in Langendorf to the Fulda monastery.

In 1025 the first church was built in Langendorf.

In 1635, during the Thirty Years' War, Swedish troops burned down the entire village, destroying its church.

From 1825 to 1830, the Church of St. Vitus was built in its present form. In 1901, the church tower was raised to match the significantly enlarged church building.

In 1951, a large part of Langendorf's district was threatened with incorporation into the military training area. This was prevented by protests. In the 1960s the Autobahn A 7 was built.

On 1 May 1978, the previously independent municipality of Langendorf was incorporated into Elfershausen as part of the district reform in Bavaria.

== Notable villagers ==
- Johannes Petri (1441 – 1511); printer and publisher
- Adam Petri (1454 – 1527); printer, publisher and bookseller
- Johannes Petreius (c. 1497 – 1550); woodcarver and printer
- Jochen Partsch (b 29 April 1962); since 2011 Mayor of the city of Darmstadt
- Theodor Wieseler (18 January 1859 – 11 December 1924); entrepreneur
