= Isolated hepatic perfusion =

Medical procedure

Isolated hepatic perfusion is a procedure in which a catheter is placed into the artery that provides blood to the liver; another catheter is placed into the vein that takes blood away from the liver. This temporarily separates the liver's blood supply from blood circulating throughout the rest of the body and allows high doses of anticancer drugs to be directed to the liver only.
