= Strafkompanie =

German word for the penal work division in Nazi concentration camps

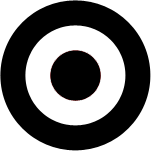
Concentration camp badge of prisoner in a Strafkompanie

Strafkompanie ("Punitive Unit") is the German word for the penal labor division in the Nazi concentration camps.

SK was the abbreviation used in the concentration camps for the notorious Strafkompanies. These penal divisions were yet another hardship that could be forced on the already exhausted inmates of the camps. The prisoners of the Strafkompanie were given hard work, e.g., in the quarries, where most "workers" died. In the SK they worked longer hours than other inmates, had shorter breaks, less food, more brutal treatment, and they lived isolated in separate barracks.

The Strafkompanie consisted of all kinds of prisoners: criminals, Jews, Soviet POWs, political prisoners, priests, Jehovah's Witnesses, homosexuals, Roma and Sinti. The criteria for the selection to the penal division were arbitrary.

== See also ==
- Nazi concentration camp badges
- Forced labor in Nazi concentration camps
- Extermination through labor
