= Machine perfusion =

Organ preservation technique

Machine perfusion (MP) is an artificial perfusion technique often used for organ preservation to help facilitate organ transplantation. MP works by continuously pumping a specialized solution through donor organs, mimicking the body's natural blood flow while actively controlling temperature, oxygen levels, chemical composition, and mechanical stress within the organ. By maintaining organ viability outside the body for extended periods, machine perfusion addresses critical challenges in organ transplantation, such as limited preservation times, and introduces a time window for graft assessment and repair.

Machine perfusion has various forms and can be categorised according to the temperature of the perfusate: cold (4 °C) and warm (37 °C). Machine perfusion has been applied to renal transplantation, liver transplantation and lung transplantation. It is an alternative to static cold storage (SCS).

== Research and development ==
A record-long of human transplant organ preservation with machine perfusion of a liver for 3 days rather than usually <12 hours was reported in 2022. It could possibly be extended to 10 days and prevent substantial cell damage by low temperature preservation methods. Alternative approaches include novel cryoprotectant solvents.

There is a novel organ perfusion system under development that can restore, i.e. on the cellular level, multiple vital (pig) organs one hour after death (during which the body had a prolonged warm ischaemia), and a similar method/system for reviving (pig) brains hours after death. The system for cellular recovery could be used to preserve donor organs or for revival-treatments in medical emergencies.

== History of kidney preservation techniques ==
Diagram of normothermic regional perfusion of abdominal organs preparation for transplantation

An essential preliminary to the development of kidney storage and transplantation was the work of Alexis Carrel in developing methods for Vascular anastomosis. Carrel went on to describe the first kidney transplants, which were performed in dogs in 1902; Ullman independently described similar experiments in the same year. In these experiments kidneys were transplanted without there being any attempt at storage.

The crucial step in making in vitro storage of kidneys possible, was the demonstration by Fuhrman in 1943, of a reversible effect of hypothermia on the metabolic processes of isolated tissues. Prior to this, kidneys had been stored at normal body temperatures using blood or diluted blood perfusates, but no successful reimplantations had been made. Fuhrman showed that slices of rat kidney cortex and brain withstood cooling to 0.2 °C for one hour at which temperature their oxygen consumption was minimal. When the slices were rewarmed to 37 °C their oxygen consumption recovered to normal.

The beneficial effect of hypothermia on ischaemic intact kidneys was demonstrated by Owens in 1955 when he showed that, if dogs were cooled to 23-26 °C, and their thoracic aortas were occluded for 2 hours, their kidneys showed no apparent damage when the dogs were rewarmed. This protective effect of hypothermia on renal ischaemic damage was confirmed by Bogardus who showed a protective effect from surface cooling of dog kidneys whose renal pedicles were clamped in situ for 2 hours. Moyer demonstrated the applicability of these dog experiments to the human, by showing the same effect on dog and human kidney function from the same periods of hypothermic ischaemia.

It was not until 1958 that it was shown that intact dog kidneys would survive ischaemia even better if they were cooled to lower temperatures. Stueber showed that kidneys would survive in situ clamping of the renal pedicle for 6 hours if the kidneys were cooled to 0-5 °C by being placed in a cooling jacket, and Schloerb showed that a similar technique with cooling of heparinised dog kidneys to 2-4 °C gave protection for 8 hours but not 12 hours. Schloerb also attempted in vitro storage and auto-transplantation of cooled kidneys, and had one long term survivor after 4 hours kidney storage followed by reimplantation and immediate contralateral nephrectomy. He also had a near survivor, after 24-hour kidney storage and delayed contralateral nephrectomy, in a dog that developed a late arterial thrombosis in the kidney.

These methods of surface cooling were improved by the introduction of techniques in which the kidney's vascular system was flushed out with cold fluid prior to storage. This had the effect of increasing the speed of cooling of the kidney and removed red cells from the vascular system. Kiser used this technique to achieve successful 7 hours in vitro storage of a dog kidney, when the kidney had been flushed at 5 °C with a mixture of dextran and diluted blood prior to storage. In 1960 Lapchinsky confirmed that similar storage periods were possible, when he reported eight dogs surviving after their kidneys had been stored at 2-4 °C for 28 hours, followed by auto-transplantation and delayed contralateral nephrectomy. Although Lapchinsky gave no details in his paper, Humphries reported that these experiments had involved cooling the kidneys for 1 hour with cold blood, and then storage at 2-4 °C, followed by rewarming of the kidneys over 1 hour with warm blood at the time of reimplantation. The contralateral nephrectomies were delayed for two months.

Humphries developed this storage technique by continuously perfusing the kidney throughout the period of storage. He used diluted plasma or serum as the perfusate and pointed out the necessity for low perfusate pressures to prevent kidney swelling, but admitted that the optimum values for such variables as perfusate temperature, Po_{2}, and flow, remained unknown. His best results, at this time, were 2 dogs that survived after having their kidneys stored for 24 hours at 4-10 °C followed by auto-transplantation and delayed contralateral nephrectomy a few weeks later.

Calne challenged the necessity of using continuous perfusion methods by demonstrating that successful 12-hour preservation could be achieved using much simpler techniques. Calne had one kidney supporting life even when the contralateral nephrectomy was performed at the same time as the reimplantation operation. Calne merely heparinised dog kidneys and then stored them in iced solution at 4 °C. Although 17-hour preservation was shown to be possible in one experiment when nephrectomy was delayed, no success was achieved with 24-hour storage.

The next advance was made by Humphries in 1964, when he modified the perfusate used in his original continuous perfusion system, and had a dog kidney able to support life after 24-hour storage, even when an immediate contralateral nephrectomy was performed at the same time as the reimplantation. In these experiments autogenous blood, diluted 50% with Tis-U-Sol solution at 10 °C, was used as the perfusate. The perfusate pressure was 40 mm Hg and perfusate pH 7.11-7.35 (at 37 °C). A membrane lung was used for oxygenation to avoid damaging the blood.

In attempting to improve on these results Manax investigated the effect of hyperbaric oxygen, and found that successful 48-hour storage of dog kidneys was possible at 2 °C without using continuous perfusion, when the kidneys were flushed with a dextran/Tis-U-Sol solution before storage at 7.9 atmospheres pressure, and if the contralateral nephrectomy was delayed till 2 to 4 weeks after reimplantation. Manax postulated that hyperbaric oxygen might work either by inhibiting metabolism or by aiding diffusion of oxygen into the kidney cells, but he reported no control experiments to determine whether other aspects of his model were more important than hyperbaria.

A marked improvement in storage times was achieved by Belzer in 1967 when he reported successful 72-hour kidney storage after returning to the use of continuous perfusion using a canine plasma based perfusate at 8-12 °C. Belzer found that the crucial factor in permitting uncomplicated 72-hour perfusion was cryoprecipitation of the plasma used in the perfusate to reduce the amount of unstable lipo-proteins which otherwise precipitated out of solution and progressively obstructed the kidney's vascular system. A membrane oxygenator was also used in the system in a further attempt to prevent denaturation of the lipo-proteins because only 35% of the lipo-proteins were removed by cryo-precipitation. The perfusate comprised 1 litre of canine plasma, 4 mEq of magnesium sulphate, 250 mL of dextrose, 80 units of insulin, 200,000 units of penicillin and 100 mg of hydrocortisone. Besides being cryo-precipitated, the perfusate was pre-filtered through a 0.22 micron filter immediately prior to use. Belzer used a perfusate pH of 7.4-7.5, a Po_{2} of 150–190 mm Hg, and a perfusate pressure of 50–80 mm Hg systolic, in a machine that produced a pulsatile perfusate flow. Using this system Belzer had 6 dogs surviving after their kidneys had been stored for 72 hours and then reimplanted, with immediate contralateral nephrectomies being performed at the reimplantation operations.

Belzer's use of hydrocortisone as an adjuvant to preservation had been suggested by Lotke's work with dog kidney slices, in which hydrocortisone improved the ability of slices to excrete PAH and oxygen after 30 hour storage at 2-4 °C; Lotke suggested that hydrocortisone might be acting as a lysosomal membrane stabiliser in these experiments. The other components of Belzer's model were arrived at empirically. The insulin and magnesium were used partially in an attempt to induce artificial hibernation, as Suomalainen found this regime to be effective in inducing hibernation in natural hibernators. The magnesium was also provided as a metabolic inhibitor following Kamiyama's demonstration that it was an effective agent in dog heart preservation. A further justification for the magnesium was that it was needed to replace calcium which had been bound by citrate in the plasma.

Belzer demonstrated the applicability of his dog experiments to human kidney storage when he reported his experiences in human renal transplantation using the same storage techniques as he had used for dog kidneys. He was able to store kidneys for up to 50 hours with only 8% of patients requiring post operative dialysis when the donor had been well prepared.

In 1968 Humphries reported 1 survivor out of 14 dogs following 5 day storage of their kidneys in a perfusion machine at 10 °C, using a diluted plasma medium containing extra fatty acids. However, delayed contralateral nephrectomy 4 weeks after reimplantation was necessary in these experiments to achieve success, and this indicated that the kidneys were severely injured during storage.

In 1969 Collins reported an improvement in the results that could be achieved with simple non perfusion methods of hypothermic kidney storage. He based his technique on the observation by Keller that the loss of electrolytes from a kidney during storage could be prevented by the use of a storage fluid containing cations in quantities approaching those normally present in cells. In Collins' model, the dogs were well hydrated prior to nephrectomy, and were also given mannitol to induce a diuresis. Phenoxybenzamine, a vasodilator and lysozomal enzyme stabiliser, was injected into the renal artery before nephrectomy. The kidneys were immersed in saline immediately after removal, and perfused through the renal artery with 100-150 mL of a cold electrolyte solution from a height of 100 cm. The kidneys remained in iced saline for the rest of the storage period. The solution used for these successful cold perfusions imitated the electrolyte composition of intracellular fluids by containing large amounts of potassium and magnesium. The solution also contained glucose, heparin, procaine and phenoxybenzamine. The solution's pH was 7.0 at 25 °C. Collins was able to achieve successful 24-hour storage of 6 kidneys, and 30 hour storage of 3 kidneys, with the kidneys functioning immediately after reimplantation, despite immediate contralateral nephrectomies. Collins emphasised the poor results obtained with a Ringer's solution flush, in finding similar results with this management when compared with kidneys treated by surface cooling alone. Liu reported that Collins' solution could give successful 48-hour storage when the solution was modified by the inclusion of amino acids and vitamins. However, Liu performed no control experiments to show that these modifications were crucial.

Difficulty was found by other workers in repeating Belzer's successful 72-hour perfusion storage experiments. Woods was able to achieve successful 48-hour storage of 3 out of 6 kidneys when he used the Belzer additives with cryoprecipitated plasma as the perfusate in a hypothermic perfusion system, but he was unable to extend the storage time to 72 hours as Belzer had done. However, Woods later achieved successful 3 and 7 days storage of dog kidneys. Woods had modified Belzer's perfusate by the addition of 250 mg of methyl prednisolone, increased the magnesium sulphate content to 16.2 mEq and the insulin to 320 units. Six of 6 kidneys produced life sustaining function when they were reimplanted after 72 hours storage despite immediate contralateral nephrectomies; 1 of 2 kidneys produced life sustaining function after 96 hours storage, 1 of 2 after 120 hours storage, and 1 of 2 after 168 hours storage. Perfusate pressure was 60 mm Hg with a perfusate pump rate of 70 beats per minute, and perfusate pH was automatically maintained at 7.4 by a CO_{2} titrator. Woods stressed the importance of hydration of the donor and recipient animals. Without the methyl prednisolone, Woods found vessel fragility to be a problem when storage times were longer than 48 hours.

A major simplification to the techniques of hypothermic perfusion storage was made by Johnson and Claes in 1972 with the introduction of an albumin based perfusate. This perfusate eliminated the need for the manufacture of the cryoprecipitated and millipore filtered plasma used by Belzer. The preparation of this perfusate had been laborious and time-consuming, and there was the potential risk from hepatitis virus and cytotoxic antibodies. The absence of lipo-proteins from the perfusate meant that the membrane oxygenator could be eliminated from the perfusion circuit, as there was no need to avoid a perfusate/air interface to prevent precipitation of lipo-proteins. Both workers used the same additives as recommended by Belzer.

The solution that Johnson used was prepared by the Blood Products Laboratory (Elstree: England) by extracting heat labile fibrinogen and gamma globulins from plasma to give a plasma protein fraction (PPF) solution. The solution was incubated at 60 °C for 10 hours to inactivate the agent of serum hepatitis. The result was a 45 g/L human albumin solution containing small amounts of gamma and beta globulins which was stable between 0 °C and 30 °C for 5 years. PPF contained 2.2 mmol/L of free fatty acids.

Johnson's experiments were mainly concerned with the storage of kidneys that had been damaged by prolonged warm injury. However, in a control group of non-warm injured dog kidneys, Johnson showed that 24-hour preservation was easily achieved when using a PPF perfusate, and he described elsewhere a survivor after 72 hours perfusion and reimplantation with immediate contralateral nephrectomy. With warm injured kidneys, PPF perfusion gave better results than Collins' method, with 6 out of 6 dogs surviving after 40 minutes warm injury and 24-hour storage followed by reimplantation of the kidneys and immediate contralateral nephrectomy. Potassium, magnesium, insulin, glucose, hydrocortisone and ampicillin were added to the PPF solution to provide an energy source and to prevent leakage of intracellular potassium. Perfusate temperature was 6 °C, pressure 40–80 mm Hg, and Po_{2} 200–400 mm Hg. The pH was maintained between 7.2 and 7.4.

Claes used a perfusate based on human albumin (Kabi: Sweden) diluted with saline to a concentration of 45 g/L. Claes preserved 4 out of 5 dog kidneys for 96 hours with the kidneys functioning immediately after reimplantation despite immediate contralateral nephrectomies. Claes also compared this perfusate with Belzer's cryoprecipitated plasma in a control group and found no significant difference between the function of the reimplanted kidneys in the two groups.

The only other group besides Woods' to report successful seven-day storage of kidneys was Liu and Humphries in 1973. They had three out of seven dogs surviving, after their kidneys had been stored for seven days followed by reimplantation and immediate contralateral nephrectomy. Their best dog had a peak post reimplantation creatinine of 50 mg/L (0.44 mmol/L). Liu used well hydrated dogs undergoing a mannitol diuresis and stored the kidneys at 9 °C – 10 °C using a perfusate derived from human PPF. The PPF was further fractionated by using a highly water-soluble polymer (Pluronic F-38), and sodium acetyl tryptophanate and sodium caprylate were added to the PPF as stabilisers to permit pasteurisation. To this solution were added human albumin, heparin, mannitol, glucose, magnesium sulphate, potassium chloride, insulin, methyl prednisolone, carbenicillin, and water to adjust the osmolality to 300-310 mosmol/kg. The perfusate was exchanged after 3.5 days storage. Perfusate pressure was 60 mm Hg or less, at a pump rate of 60 per minute. Perfusate pH was 7.12–7.32 (at 37 °C), Pco2 27–47 mm Hg, and Po_{2} 173–219 mm Hg. In a further report on this study Humphries found that when the experiments were repeated with a new batch of PPF no survivors were obtained, and histology of the survivors from the original experiment showed glomerular hypercellularity which he attributed to a possible toxic effect of the Pluronic polymer.

Joyce and Proctor reported the successful use of a simple dextran based perfusate for 72-hour storage of dog kidneys. 10 out of 17 kidneys were viable after reimplantation and immediate contralateral nephrectomy. Joyce used non pulsatile perfusion at 4 °C with a perfusate containing Dextran 70 (Pharmacia) 2.1%, with additional electrolytes, glucose (19.5 g/L), procaine and hydrocortisone. The perfusate contained no plasma or plasma components. Perfusate pressure was only 30 cm H_{2}O, pH 7.34-7.40 and Po_{2} 250–400 mm Hg. This work showed that, for 72-hour storage, no nutrients other than glucose were needed, and low perfusate pressures and flows were adequate.

In 1973 Sacks showed that simple ice storage could be successfully used for 72-hour storage when a new flushing solution was used for the initial cooling and flush out of the kidney. Sacks removed kidneys from well hydrated dogs that were diuresing after a mannitol infusion, and flushed the kidneys with 200 mL of solution from a height of 100 cm. The kidneys were then simply kept at 2 °C for 72 hours without further perfusion. Reimplantation was followed by immediate contralateral nephrectomies. The flush solution was designed to imitate intracellular fluid composition and contained mannitol as an impermeable ion to further prevent cell swelling. The osmolality of the solution was 430 mosmol/kg and its pH was 7.0 at 2 °C. The additives that had been used by Collins (dextrose, phenoxybenzamine, procaine and heparin) were omitted by Sacks.

These results have been equalled by Ross who also achieved successful 72-hour storage without using continuous perfusion, although he was unable to reproduce Collins' or Sacks' results using the original Collins' or Sacks' solutions. Ross's successful solution was similar in electrolyte composition to intracellular fluid with the addition of hypertonic citrate and mannitol. No phosphate, bicarbonate, chloride or glucose were present in the solution; the osmolality was 400 mosmol/kg and the pH 7.1. Five of 8 dogs survived reimplantation of their kidneys and immediate contralateral nephrectomy, when the kidneys had been stored for 72 hours after having been flushed with Ross's solution; but Ross was unable to achieve 7 day storage with this technique even when delayed contralateral nephrectomy was used.

The requirements for successful 72-hour hypothermic perfusion storage have been further defined by Collins who showed that pulsatile perfusion was not needed if a perfusate pressure of 49 mm Hg was used, and that 7 °C was a better temperature for storage than 2 °C or 12 °C. He also compared various perfusate compositions and found that a phosphate buffered perfusate could be used successfully, so eliminating the need for a carbon dioxide supply. Grundmann has also shown that low perfusate pressure is adequate. He used a mean pulsatile pressure of 20 mm Hg in 72-hour perfusions and found that this gave better results than mean pressures of 15, 40, 50 or 60 mm Hg.

Successful storage up to 8 days was reported by Cohen using various types of perfusate – with the best result being obtained when using a phosphate buffered perfusate at 8 °C. Inability to repeat these successful experiments was thought to be due to changes that had been made in the way that the PPF was manufactured with higher octanoic acid content being detrimental. Octanoic acid was shown to be able to stimulate metabolic activity during hypothermic perfusion and this might be detrimental.

== Nature of kidney preservation injury ==
=== Structural injury ===
The structural changes that occur during 72-hour hypothermic storage of previously uninjured kidneys have been described by Mackay who showed how there was progressive vacuolation of the cytoplasm of the cells which particularly affected the proximal tubules. On electron microscopy the mitochondria were seen to become swollen with early separation of the internal cristal membranes and later loss of all internal structure. Lysosomal integrity was well preserved until late, and the destruction of the cell did not appear to be caused by lytic enzymes because there was no more injury immediately adjacent to the lysosomes than in the rest of the cell.

Woods and Liu – when describing successful 5 and 7 day kidney storage - described the light microscopic changes seen at the end of perfusion and at post mortem, but found few gross abnormalities apart from some infiltration with lymphocytes and occasional tubular atrophy.

The changes during short perfusions of human kidneys prior to reimplantation have been described by Hill who also performed biopsies 1 hour after reimplantation. On electron microscopy Hill found endothelial damage which correlated with the severity of the fibrin deposition after reimplantation. The changes that Hill saw in the glomeruli on light microscopy were occasional fibrin thrombi and infiltration with polymorphs. Hill suspected that these changes were an immunologically induced lesion, but found that there was no correlation between the severity of the histological lesion and the presence or absence of immunoglobulin deposits.

There are several reports of the analysis of urine produced by kidneys during perfusion storage. Kastagir analysed urine produced during 24-hour perfusion and found it to be an ultrafiltrate of the perfusate, Scott found a trace of protein in the urine during 24-hour storage, and Pederson found only a trace of protein after 36 hours perfusion storage. Pederson mentioned that he had found heavy proteinuria during earlier experiments. Woods noted protein casts in the tubules of viable kidneys after 5 day storage, but he did not analyse the urine produced during perfusion. In Cohen's study there was a progressive increase in urinary protein concentration during 8 day preservation until the protein content of the urine equalled that of the perfusate. This may have been related to the swelling of the glomerular basement membranes and the progressive fusion of epithelial cell foot processes that was also observed during the same period of perfusion storage.

=== Mechanisms of injury ===
The mechanisms that damage kidneys during hypothermic storage can be sub-divided as follows:

1. Injury to the metabolic processes of the cell caused by:
  1. Cold
  2. Anoxia when the kidney is warm both before and after the period of hypothermic storage.
  3. Failure to supply the correct nutrients.
  4. Toxin accumulation in the perfusate.
  5. Toxic damage from the storage fluid.
  6. Washout of essential substrates from the kidney cells.
2. Injury to nuclear DNA.
3. Mechanical injury to the vascular system of the kidney during hypothermic perfusion.
4. Post reimplantation injury.

==== Metabolic injury ====
===== Cold =====
At normal temperatures pumping mechanisms in cell walls retain intracellular potassium at high levels and extrude sodium. If these pumps fail sodium is taken up by the cell and potassium lost. Water follows the sodium passively and results in swelling of the cells. The importance of this control of cell swelling was demonstrated by McLoughlin who found a significant correlation between canine renal cortical water content and the ability of kidneys to support life after 36-hour storage. The pumping mechanism is driven by the enzyme system known as Na+K+- activated ATPase and is inhibited by cold. Levy found that metabolic activity at 10 °C, as indicated by oxygen consumption measurements, was reduced to about 5% of normal and, because all enzyme systems are affected in a similar way by hypothermia, ATPase activity is markedly reduced at 10 °C.

There are, however, tissue and species differences in the cold sensitivity of this ATPase which may account for the differences in the ability of tissues to withstand hypothermia. Martin has shown that in dog kidney cortical cells some ATPase activity is still present at 10 °C but not at 0 °C. In liver and heart cells activity was completely inhibited at 10 °C and this difference in the cold sensitivity of ATPase correlated with the greater difficulty in controlling cell swelling during hypothermic storage of liver and heart cells. A distinct ATPase is found in vessel walls, and this was shown by Belzer to be completely inhibited at 10 °C, when at this temperature kidney cortical cells ATPase is still active. These experiments were performed on aortic endothelium, but if the vascular endothelium of the kidney has the same properties, then vascular injury may be the limiting factor in prolonged kidney storage.

Willis has shown how hibernators derive some of their ability to survive low temperatures by having a Na+K+-ATPase which is able to transport sodium and potassium actively across their cell membranes, at 5 °C, about six times faster than in non-hibernators; this transport rate is sufficient to prevent cell swelling.

The rate of cooling of a tissue may also be significant in the production of injury to enzyme systems. Francavilla showed that when liver slices were rapidly cooled (immediate cooling to 12 °C in 6 minutes) anaerobic glycolysis, as measured on rewarming to 37 °C, was inhibited by about 67% of the activity that was demonstrated in slices that had been subjected to delayed cooling. However, dog kidney slices were less severely affected by the rapid cooling than were the liver slices.

===== Anoxia =====
All cells require ATP as an energy source for their metabolic activity. The kidney is damaged by anoxia when kidney cortical cells are unable to generate sufficient ATP under anaerobic conditions to meet the needs of the cells. When excising a kidney some anoxia is inevitable in the interval between dividing the renal artery and cooling the kidney. It has been shown by Bergstrom that 50% of a dog's kidney's cortical cells ATP content is lost within 1 minute of clamping the renal artery, and similar results were found by Warnick in whole mice kidneys, with a fall in cellular ATP by 50% after about 30 seconds of warm anoxia. Warnick and Bergstrom also showed that cooling the kidney immediately after removal markedly reduced any further ATP loss. When these non warm-injured kidneys were perfused with oxygenated hypothermic plasma, ATP levels were reduced by 50% after 24-hour storage and, after 48 hours, mean tissue ATP levels were a little higher than this indicating that synthesis of ATP had occurred. Pegg has shown that rabbit kidneys can resynthesize ATP after a period of perfusion storage following warm injury, but no resynthesis occurred in non warm-injured kidneys.

Warm anoxia can also occur during reimplantation of the kidney after storage. Lannon showed, by measurements of succinate metabolism, how the kidney was more sensitive to a period of warm hypoxia occurring after storage than to the same period of warm hypoxia occurring immediately prior to storage.

===== Lack of essential nutrients =====
Active metabolism of glucose with production of bicarbonate has been demonstrated by Pettersson and Cohen.

Pettersson studies were on the metabolism of glucose and fatty acids by kidneys during 6 day hypothermic perfusion storage and he found that the kidneys consumed glucose at 4.4 μmol/g/day and fatty acids at 5.8 μmol/g/day. In Cohen's study the best 8 day stored kidneys consumed glucose at the rate of 2.3 μmol/g/day and 4.9 μmol/g/day respectively which made it likely that they were using fatty acids at similar rates to Pettersson's dogs' kidneys. The constancy of both the glucose consumption rate and the rate of bicarbonate production implied that no injury was affecting the glycolytic enzyme or carbonic anhydrase enzyme systems.

Lee showed that fatty acids were the preferred substrate of the rabbit's kidney cortex at normothermic temperatures, and glucose the preferred substrate for the medullary cells which normally metabolise anaerobically. Abodeely showed that both fatty acids and glucose could be utilised by the outer medulla of the rabbit's kidney but that glucose was used preferentially. At hypothermia the metabolic needs of the kidney are much reduced but measurable consumption of glucose, fatty acids and ketone bodies occurs. Horsburgh showed that lipid is utilised by hypothermic kidneys, with palmitate consumption being 0-15% of normal in the rat kidney cortex at 15 °C. Pettersson showed that, on a molar basis, glucose and fatty acids were metabolised by hypothermically perfused kidneys at about the same rates. The cortex of the hypothermic dog kidney was shown by Huang to lose lipid (35% loss of total lipid after 24 hours) unless oleate was added to the kidney perfusate. Huang commented that this loss could affect the structure of the cell and that the loss also suggested that the kidney was utilising fatty acid. In a later publication Huang showed that dog kidney cortex slices metabolised fatty acids, but not glucose, at 10 °C.

Even if the correct nutrients are provided, they may be lost by absorption into the tubing of the preservation system. Lee demonstrated that silicone rubber (a material used extensively in kidney preservation systems) absorbed 46% of a perfusate's oleic acid after 4 hours of perfusion.

===== Toxin accumulation =====
Abouna showed that ammonia was released into the perfusate during 3 day kidney storage, and suggested that this might be toxic to the kidney cells unless removed by frequent replacement of the perfusate. Some support for the use of perfusate exchange during long perfusions was provided by Liu who used perfusate exchange in his successful 7 day storage experiments. Grundmann also found that 96-hour preservation quality was improved by the use of a double volume of perfusate or by perfusate exchange. However, Grundmann's conclusions were based on comparisons with a control group of only 3 dogs. Cohen was unable to demonstrate any production of ammonia during 8 days of perfusion and no benefit from perfusate exchange; the progressive alkalinity that occurred during perfusion was shown to be due to bicarbonate production.

===== Toxic damage from the perfusate =====
Certain perfusates have been shown to have toxic effects on kidneys as a result of the inadvertent inclusion of particular chemicals in their formulation. Collins showed that the procaine included in the formulation of his flush fluids could be toxic, and Pegg has commented how toxic materials, such as PVC plasticizers, may be washed out of perfusion circuit tubing. Dvorak showed that the methyl-prednisolone addition to the perfusate that was thought to be essential by Woods might in some circumstances be harmful. He showed that with over g of methyl-prednisolone in 650 mL of perfusate (compared with 250 mg in 1 litre used by Woods) irreversible haemodynamic and structural changes were produced in the kidney after 20 hours of perfusion. There was necrosis of capillary loops, occlusion of Bowman's spaces, basement membrane thickening and endothelial cell damage.

===== Washout of essential substrates =====
The level of nucleotides remaining in the cell after storage was thought by Warnick to be important in determining whether the cell would be able to re-synthesize ATP and recover after rewarming. Frequent changing of the perfusate or the use of a large volume of perfusate has the theoretical disadvantage that broken down adenine nucleotides may be washed out of the cells and so not be available for re-synthesis into ATP when the kidney is rewarmed.

==== Injury to nuclear DNA ====
Nuclear DNA is injured during cold storage of kidneys. Lazarus showed that single stranded DNA breaks occurred within 16 hours in hypothermically stored mice kidneys, with the injury being inhibited a little by storage in Collins' or Sacks' solutions. This nuclear injury differed from that seen in warm injury when double stranded DNA breaks occurred.

==== Mechanical injury to the vascular system ====
Perfusion storage methods can mechanically injury the vascular endothelium of the kidney, which leads to arterial thrombosis or fibrin deposition after reimplantation. Hill noted that, in human kidneys, fibrin deposition in the glomerulus after reimplantation and postoperative function, correlated with the length of perfusion storage. He had taken biopsies at revascularisation from human kidneys preserved by perfusion or ice storage, and showed by electron microscopy that endothelial disruption only occurred in those kidneys that had been perfused. Biopsies taken one hour after revascularisation showed platelets and fibrin adherent to any areas of denuded vascular basement membrane. A different type of vascular damage was described by Sheil who showed how a jet lesion could be produced distal to the cannula tied into the renal artery, leading to arterial thrombosis approximately 1 cm distal to the cannula site.

==== Post reimplantation injury ====
There is evidence that immunological mechanisms may injure hypothermically perfused kidneys after reimplantation if the perfusate contained specific antibody. Cross described two pairs of human cadaver kidneys that were perfused simultaneously with cryoprecipitated plasma containing type specific HLA antibody to one of the pairs. Both these kidneys suffered early arterial thrombosis. Light described similar hyperacute rejection following perfusion storage and showed that the cryoprecipitated plasma used contained cytotoxic IgM antibody. This potential danger of using cryoprecipitated plasma was demonstrated experimentally by Filo who perfused dog kidneys for 24 hours with specifically sensitised cryoprecipitated dog plasma and found that he could induce glomerular and vascular lesions with capillary engorgement, endothelial swelling, infiltration by polymorphonuclear leucocytes and arterial thrombosis. Immunofluorescent microscopy demonstrated specific binding of IgG along endothelial surfaces, in glomeruli, and also in vessels. After reimplantation, complement fixation and tissue damage occurred in a similar pattern. There was some correlation between the severity of the histological damage and subsequent function of the kidneys.

Many workers have attempted to prevent kidneys rewarming during reimplantation but only Cohen has described using a system of active cooling. Measurements of lysosomal enzyme release from kidneys subjected to sham anastomoses, when either in or out of the cooling system, demonstrated how sensitive kidneys were to rewarming after a period of cold storage, and confirmed the effectiveness of the cooling system in preventing enzyme release. A further factor in minimising injury at the reimplantation operations may have been that the kidneys were kept at 7 °C within the cooling coil, which was within a degree of the temperature used during perfusion storage, so that the kidneys were not subjected to the greater changes in temperature that would have occurred if ice cooling had been used.

Dempster described using slow release of the vascular clamps at the end of kidney reimplantation operations to avoid injuring the kidney, but other workers have not mentioned whether or not they used this manoeuvre. After Cohen found vascular injury with intra renal bleeding after 3 days of perfusion storage, a technique of slow revascularisation was used for all subsequent experiments, with the aim of giving the intra- renal vessels time to recover their tone sufficiently to prevent full systolic pressure being applied to the fragile glomerular vessels. The absence of gross vascular injury in his later perfusions may be attributable to the use of this manoeuvre.

== See also ==
- Artificial organ
- Cryopreservation
