= Perfusion =

Passage of fluid through the circulatory or lymphatic system to an organ or tissue

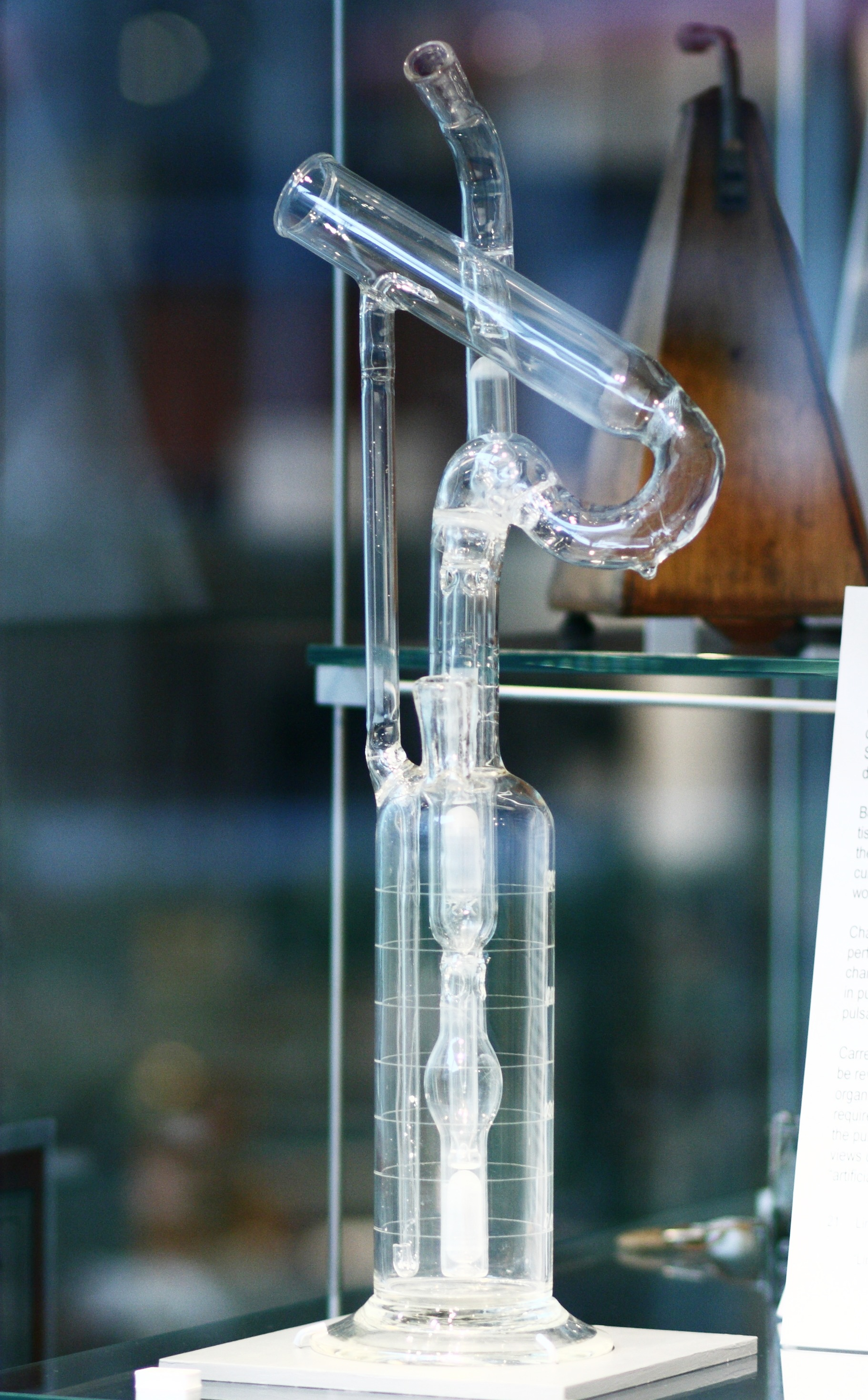
A Lindbergh perfusion pump, c. 1935, an early device for simulating natural perfusion

Perfusion is the passage of fluid through the circulatory system or lymphatic system to an organ or a tissue, usually referring to the delivery of blood to a capillary bed in tissue. Perfusion may also refer to fixation via perfusion, used in histological studies. Perfusion is measured as the rate at which blood is delivered to tissue, or volume of blood per unit time (blood flow) per unit tissue mass. The SI unit is m^{3}/(s·kg), although for human organs perfusion is typically reported in ml/min/g. The word is derived from the French verb perfuser, meaning to "pour over or through". All animal tissues require an adequate blood supply for health and life. Poor perfusion (malperfusion), that is, ischemia, causes health problems, as seen in cardiovascular disease, including coronary artery disease, cerebrovascular disease, peripheral artery disease, and many other conditions.

Tests verifying that adequate perfusion exists are a part of a patient's assessment process that are performed by medical or emergency personnel. The most common methods include evaluating a body's skin color, temperature, condition (dry/soft/firm/swollen/sunken/etc), and capillary refill.

During major surgery, especially cardiothoracic surgery, perfusion must be maintained and managed by the health professionals involved, rather than left to the body's homeostasis alone. As the lead surgeons are often too busy to handle all hemodynamic control by themselves, specialists called perfusionists manage this aspect. There are more than one hundred thousand perfusion procedures annually.

== Discovery ==
In 1920, August Krogh was awarded the Nobel Prize in Physiology or Medicine for discovering the regulation mechanism of capillaries in skeletal muscle. Krogh was the first to describe the adaptation of blood perfusion in muscle and other organs according to demands through the opening and closing of arterioles and capillaries.

== Malperfusion ==
Malperfusion can refer to any type of incorrect perfusion though it usually refers to hypoperfusion. The meaning of the terms "overperfusion" and "underperfusion" is relative to the average level of perfusion that exists across all the tissues in an individual body. Perfusion levels also differ from person to person depending on metabolic demand.

Examples follow:

- Heart tissues are considered overperfused because they normally are receiving more blood than the rest of tissues in the organism; they need this blood because they are constantly working.
- In the case of skin cells, extra blood flow in them is used for thermoregulation of a body. In addition to delivering oxygen, blood flow helps to dissipate heat in a body by redirecting warm blood closer to its surface where it can help to cool a body through sweating and thermal dissipation.
- Many types of tumors, and especially certain types, have been described as "hot and bloody" because of their overperfusion relative to the body overall.

Overperfusion and underperfusion should not be confused with hypoperfusion and hyperperfusion, which relate to the perfusion level relative to a tissue's current need to meet its metabolic needs. For example, hypoperfusion can be caused when an artery or arteriole that supplies blood to a volume of tissue becomes blocked by an embolus, causing either no blood or at least not enough blood to reach the tissue. Hyperperfusion can be caused by inflammation, producing hyperemia of a body part. Malperfusion, also called poor perfusion, is any type of incorrect perfusion. There is no official or formal dividing line between hypoperfusion and ischemia; sometimes the latter term refers to zero perfusion, but often it refers to any hypoperfusion that is bad enough to cause necrosis.

== Measurement ==
In equations, the symbol Q is sometimes used to represent perfusion when referring to cardiac output. However, this terminology can be a source of confusion since both cardiac output and the symbol Q refer to flow (volume per unit time, for example, L/min), whereas perfusion is measured as flow per unit tissue mass (mL/(min·g)).

=== Microspheres ===
Microspheres that are labeled with radioactive isotopes have been widely used to measure perfusion since the 1960s. Radioactively labeled particles are injected into the test subject and a radiation detector measures radioactivity in tissues of interest. Microspheres are used in radionuclide angiography, a method of diagnosing heart problems.

In the 1990s, methods for using fluorescent microspheres became a common substitute for radioactive particles.

=== Nuclear medicine ===
Perfusion of various tissues can be readily measured in vivo with nuclear medicine methods which are mainly positron emission tomography (PET) and single photon emission computed tomography (SPECT). Various radiopharmaceuticals targeted at specific organs are also available, some of the most common are:

- ^{99m}Tc labelled HMPAO and ECD for brain perfusion (rCBF) studied with SPECT
- ^{99m}Tc labelled Tetrofosmin and Sestamibi for myocardial perfusion imaging with SPECT
- ^{133}Xe-gas for absolute quantification of brain perfusion (rCBF) with SPECT
- ^{15}O-labeled water for brain perfusion (rCBF) with PET (absolute quantification is possible when measuring arterial radioactivity concentration)
- ^{82}Rb-chloride for measuring myocardial perfusion with PET (absolute quantification is possible)

=== Magnetic resonance imaging ===
Two main categories of magnetic resonance imaging (MRI) techniques can be used to measure tissue perfusion in vivo.

- The first is based on the use of an injected contrast agent that changes the magnetic susceptibility of blood and thereby the MR signal which is repeatedly measured during bolus passage.
- The other category is based on arterial spin labelling (ASL), where arterial blood is magnetically tagged before it enters into the tissue being examined and the amount of labelling that is measured and compared to a control recording obtained without spin labelling.

=== Computed tomography (CT) ===
Brain perfusion (more correctly transit times) can be estimated with contrast-enhanced computed tomography.

=== Thermal diffusion ===
Perfusion can be determined by measuring the total thermal diffusion and then separating it into thermal conductivity and perfusion components. rCBF is usually measured continuously in time. It is necessary to stop the measurement periodically to cool down and reassess the thermal conductivity.

== See also ==
- Reperfusion injury – Tissue damage after return of blood supply following ischemia or hypoxia
- Machine perfusion – Organ preservation technique
- Perfusionist – Healthcare professional who uses the cardiopulmonary bypass machine
- Myocardial perfusion imaging – Nuclear medicine imaging method
- rCBF – Brain blood supply
- Cerebral edema – Excess accumulation of fluid in the brain
- Pressure ulcer — continuous external pressure impairs perfusion
- Cerebral perfusion pressure
