= Channelome =

The channelome, sometimes called the "ion channelome", is the complete set of ion channels and porins expressed in a biological tissue or organism. It is analogous to the genome, the metabolome (describing metabolites), the proteome (describing general protein expression), and the microbiome. Characterization of the ion channelome, referred to as channelomics, is a branch of physiology, biophysics, neuroscience, and pharmacology, with particular attention paid to gene expression. It can be performed by a variety of techniques, including patch clamp electrophysiology, PCR, and immunohistochemistry. Channelomics is being used to screen and discover new medicines.

== Functional studies ==
Structure and function of membrane channels are closely linked, but perhaps the most famous work studying the structure of ion channels is the paper by Doyle et al. 1998, which led to the Nobel Prize in Chemistry for Roderick MacKinnon. Abnormalities of channel structure consequently result in their physiological mis-function. Channelomic studies include the systematic study of diseases resulting from such mis-functions. Such a disease is termed a channelopathy. In addition, channelomic studies screen potential drugs for their effectiveness at channelopathies, by examining the binding affinities of candidate drug compounds.
