= Mark Yeager =

American biologist

Mark Yeager is an American biologist, focusing in cardiac gap junction membrane channels, integrin water channels, rotavirus, reovirus and retrovirus. Yeager is a professor at University of Virginia and an Elected Fellow of the American Association for the Advancement of Science.

== Education ==
- Mphil, Yale University
- BS, Carnegie Mellon University
- PhD, Yale University
- MD, Yale School of Medicine
