= Membrane channel =

Membrane channels are a family of biological membrane proteins which allow the passive movement of ions (ion channels), water (aquaporins) or other solutes to passively pass through the membrane down their electrochemical gradient. They are studied using a range of channelomics experimental and mathematical techniques. Insights have suggested endocannabinoids (eCBs) as molecules that can regulate the opening of these channels during diverse conditions.

== Properties ==
=== Hemichannels ===
A hemichannel is a membrane channel made up of six subunits. A hemichannel is defined as one-half of a gap junction channel. Hemichannels consist of connexins.

=== Pannexin ===
Pannexins are involved in the process of purinergic signalling. They release adenosine triphosphate (ATP), which activate purinergic receptors. On the other hand, purinergic receptor activation can also lead to the opening of the channel, via a positive feedback loop. In addition, P2Y receptors activate inositol trisphosphate, which leads to a transient increase in intracellular calcium, and opens both connexin and pannexin channels, therefore contributing to the propagation of calcium waves across astrocytes and epithelial cells.
