= MAPseq =

Method for neuronal projection mapping

MAPseq or Multiplexed Analysis of Projections by Sequencing is a RNA-Seq based method for high-throughput mapping of neuronal projections. It was developed by Anthony Zador and his team at Cold Spring Harbor Laboratory and published in Neuron, a Cell Press magazine. It has been cited over 300 times.

== Mechanism ==
The method works by uniquely labeling neurons in a source region by injecting a viral library encoding a diverse collection of RNA sequences ("barcodes"). The barcode mRNA is expressed at high levels and transported into the axon terminals at distal target projection regions. Following this, the cells from source and putative target regions of interest are harvested, and their RNA is extracted and sequenced. By matching the presence of the unique "barcode" in the source and target tissue, one can map the projections of neuron in a one-to-many fashion.

== See also ==
- RNA-Seq
- Patch-sequencing
