= Cell isolation =

Cell isolation is the process of separating individual living cells from a solid block of tissue or cell suspension. While some types of cell naturally exist in a separated form (for example blood cells), other cell types that are found in solid tissue require specific techniques to separate them into individual cells. This may be performed by using enzymes to digest the proteins that binds these cells together within the extracellular matrix. After the matrix proteins have been digested, cells remain loosely bound together but can be gently separated mechanically. Following isolation, experiments can be performed on these single isolated cells including patch clamp electrophysiology, calcium fluorescence imaging, and immunocytochemistry.

== Techniques ==
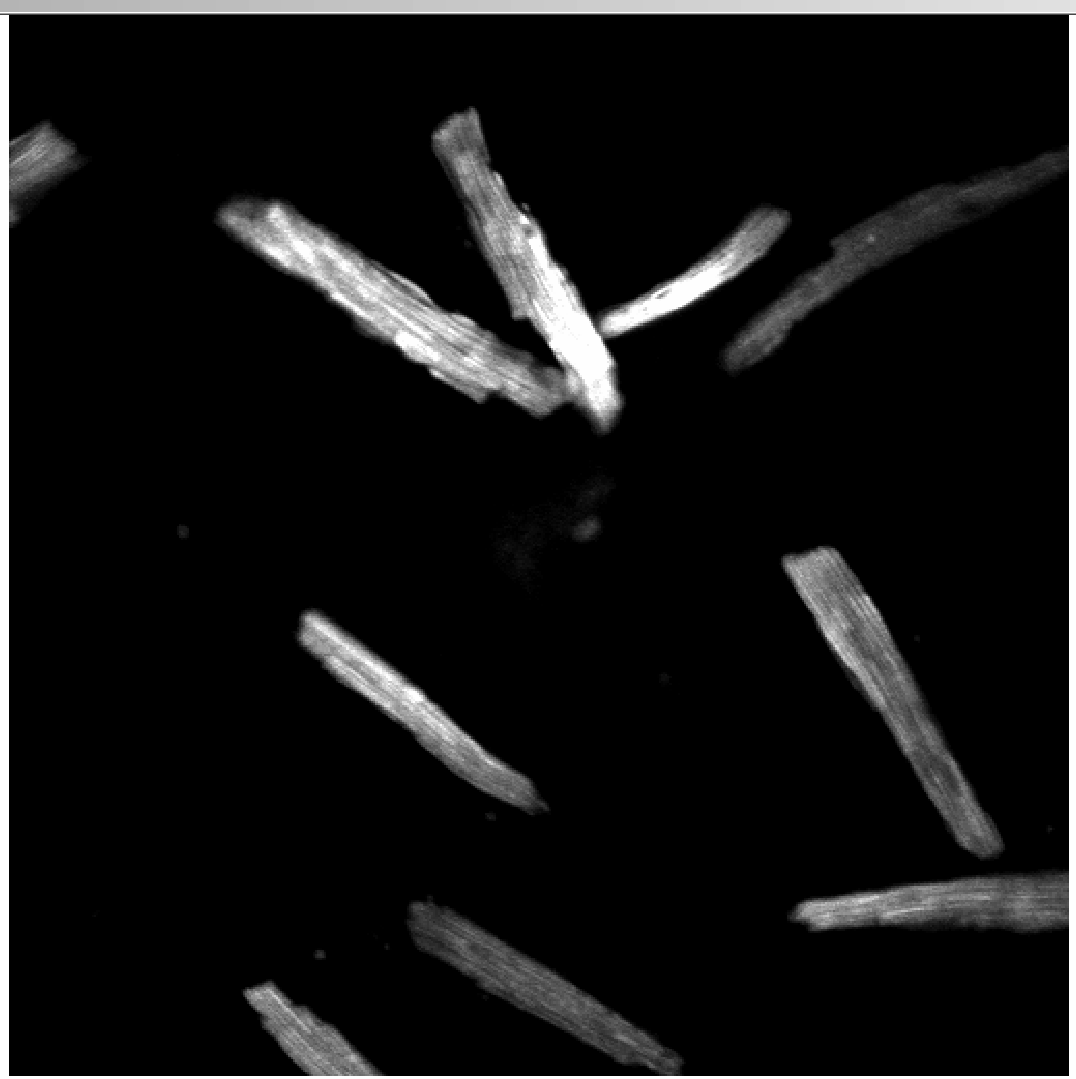
Image of isolated adult cardiac myocytes taken using confocal microscopy

=== Circulating cells ===
The techniques required to obtain isolated cells vary depending on the cell type required. Circulating cells such as blood cells or some tumour cells can be isolated by taking a blood sample. As blood samples contain a mixture of many different cell types, a method of separating out cells into different types must be used. The most commonly used method for this is flow cytometry, during which an automated analyser inspects a narrow stream of cells. In one version of this technique, a light is shone on the stream of cells, and the analyser detects the reflected light or fluorescence before using this information to rapidly manoeuvre the cells of interest into a collection chamber.

=== Solid tissues ===
When dealing with solid tissues, obtaining tissue for cell isolation may be more challenging. Surplus human tissue can sometimes be obtained at the time of planned surgery, for example specimens of right atrial appendage are often excised and discarded during open heart surgery such as coronary artery bypass surgery. Other tissues such as samples of pancreas or bladder may be taken as a biopsy. Alternatively, tissue from animals is frequently obtained by sacrificing the animal.

After a tissue specimen has been obtained, it must be surrounded or perfused by a solution at an appropriate temperature containing the salts and nutrients required to keep the cells alive. This may be performed by simply submerging the tissue in the solution, or may involve more complex arrangements such as Langendorff perfusion. Commonly used solutions included modifications of Tyrode's solution or Krebs and Henseleit's solution These solutions contain precise concentrations of electrolytes including sodium, potassium, calcium, magnesium, phosphate, chloride, and glucose. The concentrations of these electrolytes must be carefully balanced, paying attention to osmotic pressure. The acidity of the solution must be regulated, often using a pH buffer such as HEPES. Isolation of cells from some tissues may be improved by oxygenating the solution. In the initial stages, perfusing the tissue with a solution that does not contain calcium is useful particularly when isolating cardiac myocytes, as the absence of calcium causes separation of the intercalated disks.

Proteolytic enzymes can then be added to the solution. Enzymes that digest collagen (collagenases) are often used when isolating cells from the heart or bladder. General-purpose enzymes that digest many sorts of protein (proteases) may also be used. When isolating cells from brain tissue, other enzymes that break down DNA (DNAases) may be required.

These enzymes, in addition to digesting the extracellular matrix, can also digest other important proteins essential for the cells of interest to function. If cells are exposed to these enzymes for too long then cell death results, but if they are not exposed to the enzymes for long enough then digestion of the extracellular matrix will not be complete. After the enzymes have been removed from the tissue by perfusing it with a second solution that does not contain enzymes, cells can be mechanically separated or dissociated. A simple technique for dissociating cells involves cutting the tissue into small chunk before agitating the chunks in a solution using a pipette.

== Uses ==
Isolated cells can be used to study how cells work, how they change in response to disease, and how they are affected by drugs. An example of an experimental technique which uses isolated cells is patch clamp electrophysiology, used to study how charged particles flow across the cell membrane. Complementary techniques include calcium fluorescence imaging using dyes that emit light in response to calcium to measure how calcium is regulated within the cell, and immunocytochemistry which uses antibodies tagged with a fluorescent marker to identify where proteins are located within a cell. Isolated cells can also be used for cell culture, in which a single cell multiplies to create a colony of cells.

Cell isolation can also be used as part of a treatment. Isolation of pancreatic islet cells, followed by their subsequent culture and transplantation, has been used to treat patients with Type 1 Diabetes.

== See also ==
- Cell sorting
