= Micromanipulator =

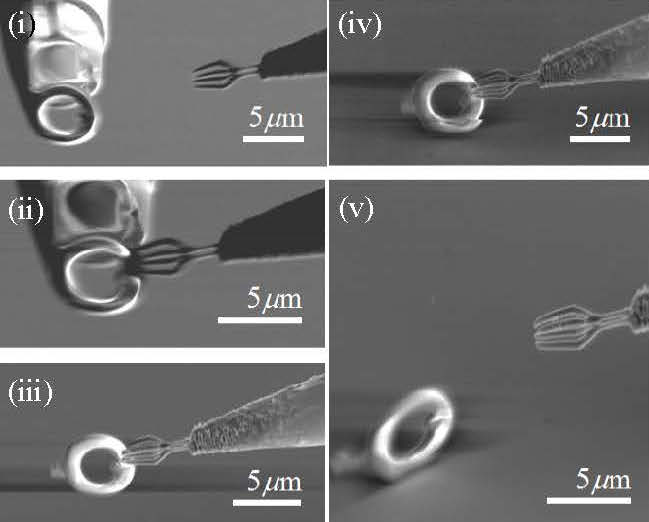
Micromanipulation inside a scanning electron microscope: (i) approaching a glass ring with a manipulator. The ring is grabbed by switching off the voltage at the manipulator (ii). It is then moved to a Si surface (iii, iv), and released (v) by re-applying voltage to the manipulator.

A micromanipulator is a device which is used to physically interact with a sample under a microscope, where a level of precision of movement is necessary that cannot be achieved by the unaided human hand. It may typically consist of an input joystick, a mechanism for reducing the range of movement and an output section with the means of holding a microtool to hold, inject, cut or otherwise manipulate the object as required. The mechanism for reducing the movement usually requires the movement to be free of backlash. This is achieved by the use of kinematic constraints to allow each part of the mechanism to move only in one or more chosen degrees of freedom, which achieves a high precision and repeatability of movement, usually at the expense of some absolute accuracy.

DIY micromanipulators have been built to realise their functionality for costs that are orders of magnitude less than commercial ones.

== Movement ==
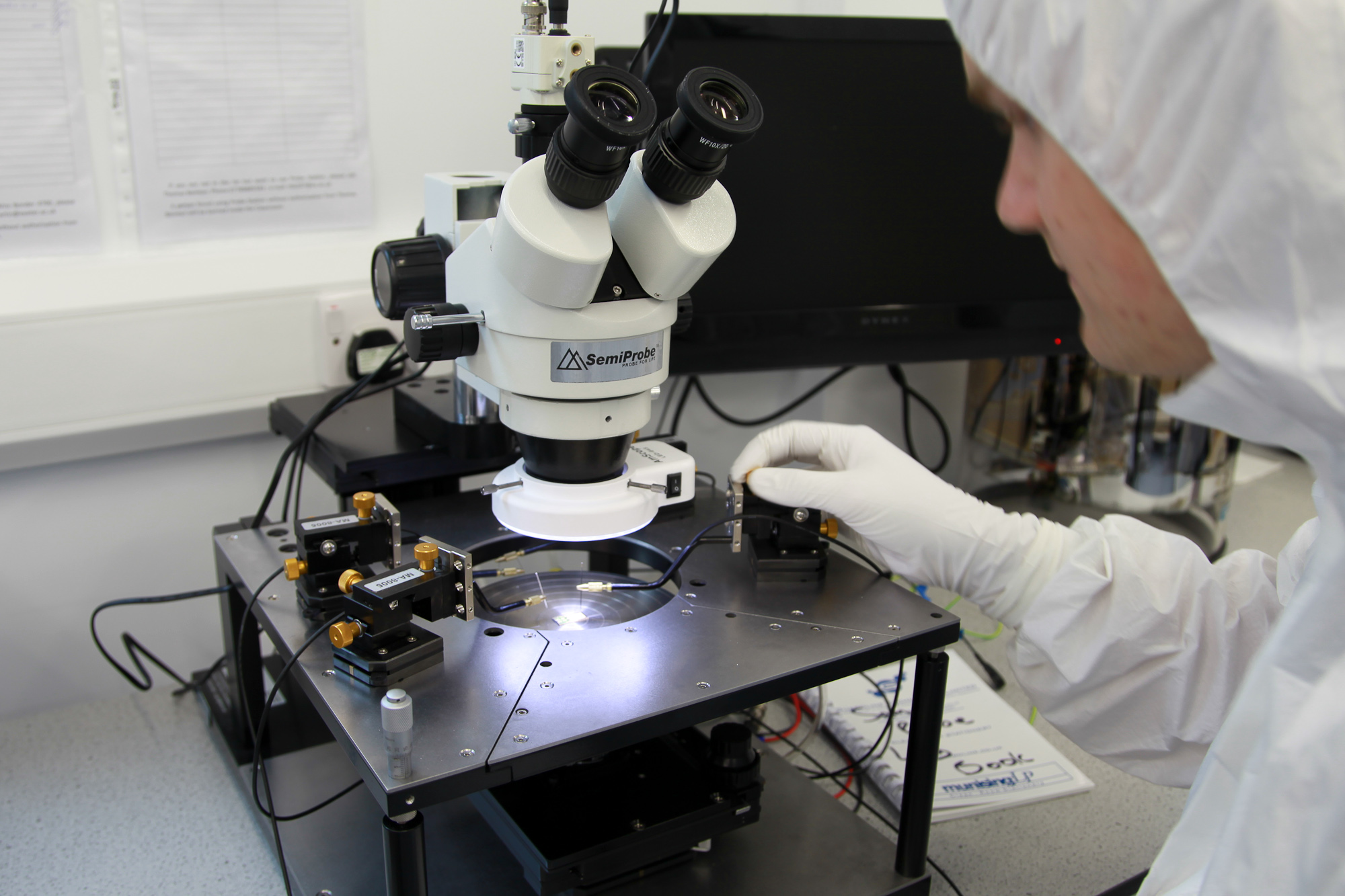
Positioning test probes onto a microchip

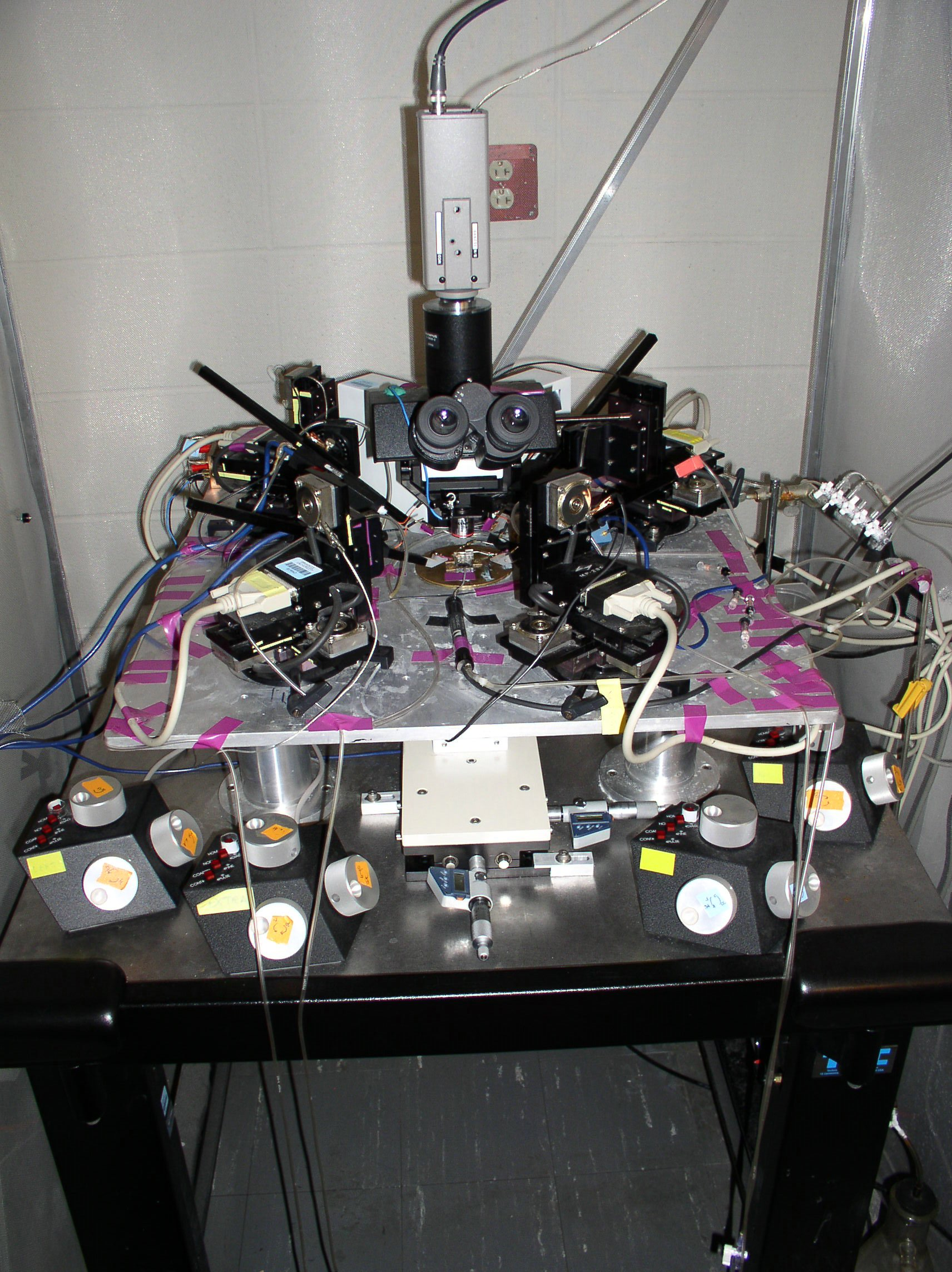
Electrophysiological setup. Micromanipulators are used to position microelectrodes

Movement reduction can be performed by mechanical levers, hydraulically using pistons of different diameters connected by tubing containing non-compressible fluid, electronically using stepper motors or linear actuators, or combinations of techniques in one instrument. Mechanisms with different ranges of movement or variable reduction ratio may be incorporated in one instrument to allow coarse and fine positioning.

Depending on the application, users may require different scales of movement resolution, movement speed, range and accuracy. These are the critical variables integrated into manipulator design by manufacturers, which are typically presented to suit particular applications.

== Microscope integration ==
Micromanipulators are usually used in conjunction with microscopes. Depending on the application, one or more micromanipulators may be fitted to a microscope stage or rigidly mounted to a bench next to a microscope. A typical application of micromanipulation is human intracytoplasmic sperm injection. Here, a spermatozoon measuring some 3 to 5 micrometres across is injected into an oocyte of approximately 100 micrometres in diameter, under the direct manual control of an embryologist. A disposable glass micropipette is fitted to a toolholder mounted on the output of the manipulator. The toolholder can be adjusted for different sized tools as well as the angle at which the tool is held.

== Microelectronics ==
Micromanipulators are also used in applications such as microelectronics to position test probes onto small to medium scale integrated circuits and hybrid devices, and patch clamp experiments in biological research.
