= Molecules and Cells =

- Discipline: Molecular biology, Cellular biology
- Language: English
- Edited by: Rho Hyun Seong

Publication details
- History: 1990–present
- Publisher: Korean Society for Molecular and Cellular Biology
- Frequency: Monthly
- Open access: Yes
- License: CC BY-NC-SA Unported 3.0

Standard abbreviations
- ISO 4: Mol. Cells

Indexing
- ISSN: 1016-8478 (print); 0219-1032 (web)

Links
- Journal homepage; Molecules and Cells @ Springer; Online access

Molecules and Cells is a peer-reviewed open access scientific journal of molecular and cellular biology. It was established in 1990 as the official publication of the Korean Society for Molecular and Cellular Biology, and is currently edited by Rho Hyun Seong (Seoul National University). From 1992 to 2013, the journal was published by Springer, but as of 2014 is published by the Society directly on a monthly basis.

== Abstracting and indexing ==
The journal is abstracted and indexed in bibliographic databases:

- Academic Search Premier
- Biosis
- CAB Abstracts
- Chemical Abstract Service
- Current Contents/Life Science
- EMBASE
- Index Medicus
- MEDLINE
- PubMed
- Research Alert
- Scopus
- Science Citation Index
- SciSearch
- Veterinary Science Database
