= Paraburkholderia atlantica =

Scientific classification
- Domain: Bacteria
- Kingdom: Pseudomonadati
- Phylum: Pseudomonadota
- Class: Betaproteobacteria
- Order: Burkholderiales
- Family: Burkholderiaceae
- Genus: Paraburkholderia
- Species: P. atlantica

Binomial name
- Paraburkholderia atlantica Paulitsch et al. 2020

Paraburkholderia atlantica is a gram-negative, aerobic, mesophilic bacterium isolated from root nodules of Mimosa pudica in Brazil's Atlantic Forest. Phylogenetic analyses, including 16S rRNA gene sequencing and multilocus sequence analysis, distinguished it from closely related species such as P. tuberum, supporting its classification as a novel species.
