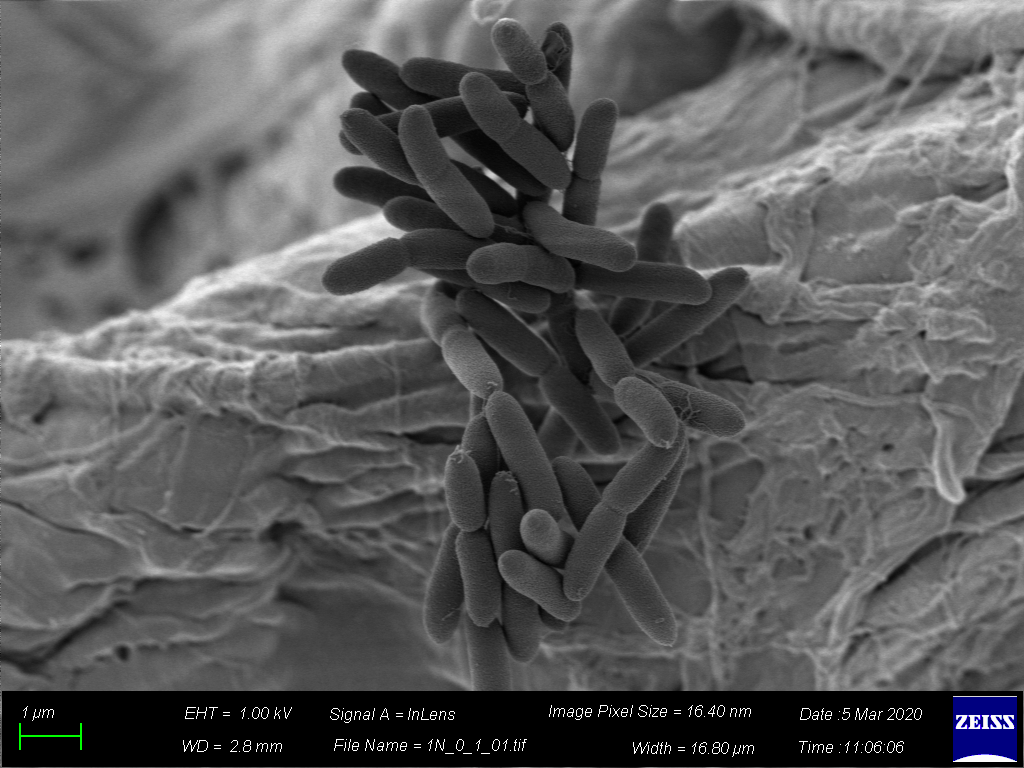
- A scanning electron micrograph of a jumble of Paraburkholderia solitsugae cells in full strength tryptic soy broth displayed against a backdrop of cellulose fibres

Scientific classification
- Domain: Bacteria
- Kingdom: Pseudomonadati
- Phylum: Pseudomonadota
- Class: Betaproteobacteria
- Order: Burkholderiales
- Family: Burkholderiaceae
- Genus: Paraburkholderia
- Species: P. solitsugae

Binomial name
- Paraburkholderia solitsugae Wilhelm et al. 2020

Type strain
- 1N; DSM 110721; LMG 31704

= Paraburkholderia solitsugae =

Species of bacteria

Paraburkholderia solitsugae is a Gram-negative bacterium belonging to the genus Paraburkholderia. The type strain, P. solitsugae 1N^{T}, was isolated from the Arnot research forest at the same time as Paraburkholderia elongata, using agar medium supplemented with soil-extracted, solubilized organic matter. P. solitsugae was named after the 'soil of hemlock trees' from which it was isolated. According to the aforementioned studies, P. solitsugae is a fast-growing, metabolically versatile bacteria and possesses the capability to degrade aromatic acids.
