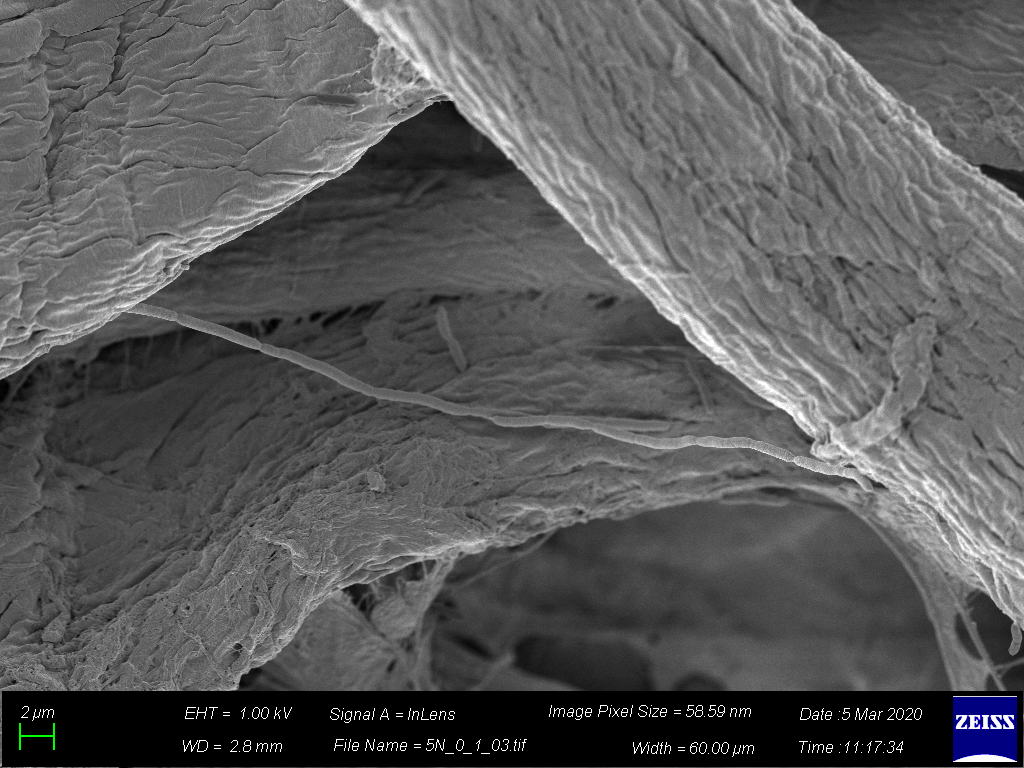
- A scanning electron micrograph of Paraburkholderia elongata cells in filamentous form grown in full strength tryptic soy broth and displayed against a backdrop of cellulose fibres

Scientific classification
- Domain: Bacteria
- Kingdom: Pseudomonadati
- Phylum: Pseudomonadota
- Class: Betaproteobacteria
- Order: Burkholderiales
- Family: Burkholderiaceae
- Genus: Paraburkholderia
- Species: P. elongata

Binomial name
- Paraburkholderia elongata Wilhelm et al. 2020

Type strain
- 5N; DSM 110722; LMG 31705

= Paraburkholderia elongata =

Species of bacteria

Paraburkholderia elongata is a Gram-negative bacterium belonging to the genus Paraburkholderia. The type strain is P. elongata 5N^{T}, which was isolated from the Arnot research forest, near Van Etten, New York, using agar medium supplemented with soil-extracted, solubilized organic matter. The same isolation effort and methodology led to the isolation of P. solitsugae 1N^{T}. P. elongata was named after its tendency to form elongated, filamentous cells when grown in concentrated growth media. Phosphate concentration was found to regulate the conditional filamentation of P. elongata, resulting from the accumulation of intracellular polyphosphate.
