= Cupriavidus pinatubonensis =

Scientific classification
- Domain: Bacteria
- Kingdom: Pseudomonadati
- Phylum: Pseudomonadota
- Class: Betaproteobacteria
- Order: Burkholderiales
- Family: Burkholderiaceae
- Genus: Cupriavidus
- Species: C. pinatubonensis

Binomial name
- Cupriavidus pinatubonensis Sato et al. 2006

Type strain
- CCUG 53907, CIP 108725, DSM 19553, KCTC 22125, LMG 23956, LMG 23994, PNCM 10346, strain 1245

Synonyms
- Ralstonia eutropha, Wautersia eutropha

Species of bacterium

Cupriavidus pinatubonensis is a Gram-negative, aerobic non-spore-forming, motile bacterium of the genus Cupriavidus and family Burkholderiaceae, isolated with Cupriavidus laharis together from volcanic mudflow deposits on Mount Pinatubo in the Philippines.
