= Basilensis =

Basilensis, a Latin adjective referring to the city of Basel, may refer to:

- Codex Basilensis (disambiguation), several books
- Cupriavidus basilensis, a bacterium species
- Ralstonia basilensis, a Gram-negative soil bacterium species
