= Caballeronia grimmiae =

Scientific classification
- Domain: Bacteria
- Kingdom: Pseudomonadati
- Phylum: Pseudomonadota
- Class: Betaproteobacteria
- Order: Burkholderiales
- Family: Burkholderiaceae
- Genus: Caballeronia
- Species: C. grimmiae

Binomial name
- Caballeronia grimmiae (Viallard et al. 1998) Dobritsa and Samadpour 2016

Type strain
- R27^{T} CGMCC 1.11013^{T} DSM 25160^{T}

Synonyms
- Burkholderia grimmiae Vaillard et al. 1998; Paraburkholderia grimmiae (Vaillard et al. 1998) Sawana et al. 2015

Species of bacterium

Caballeronia grimmiae is a gram-negative, non-spore-forming, rod-shaped bacterium from the genus of Caballeronia and the family of Burkholderiaceae which was isolated from the xerophilous moss Grimmia montana in China.
