= Pandoraea norimbergensis =

Scientific classification
- Domain: Bacteria
- Kingdom: Pseudomonadati
- Phylum: Pseudomonadota
- Class: Betaproteobacteria
- Order: Burkholderiales
- Family: Burkholderiaceae
- Genus: Pandoraea
- Species: P. norimbergensis

Binomial name
- Pandoraea norimbergensis (Wittke et al. 1998) Coenye et al. 2000

Type strain
- ATCC BAA-65^{T}, CCM 4977^{T}, CCUG 39188^{T}, CFBP 4792^{T}, CIP 105463^{T}, CIP 39188^{T}, DSM 11628^{T}, JCM 10565^{T}, LMG 18379^{T}, NCTC 13162^{T}

Synonyms
- Burkholderia norimbergensis Wittke et al. 1998

Species of bacterium

Pandoraea norimbergensis is a Gram-negative, non-spore-forming bacterium from the genus Pandoraea, with a single polar flagellum, which was isolated from an oxic water layer which had a sulfide containing sediment below in Nuremberg, Germany. Pandoraea norimbergensis has the ability to oxidate heterotrophic sulfur under slightly alkaline conditions.
