= Caballeronia calva =

"Candidatus Caballeronia calva"

Scientific classification (Candidatus)
- Domain: Bacteria
- Phylum: Pseudomonadota
- Class: Betaproteobacteria
- Order: Burkholderiales
- Family: Burkholderiaceae
- Genus: Caballeronia
- Species: "Ca. C. calva"

Binomial name
- "Candidatus Caballeronia calva"

Synonyms
- "Candidatus Burkholderia calva" Van Oevelen et al. 2004

Species of bacterium

"Candidatus Caballeronia calva" is a bacterium from the genus Caballeronia and the family Burkholderiaceae. "Candidatus Caballeronia calva" is an endosymbiont of Psychotria calva.
