= P. ginsengisoli =

P. ginsengisoli may refer to:

- Paraburkholderia ginsengisoli, a Gram-negative bacterium.
- Paralcaligenes ginsengisoli, a Gram-negative bacterium.
- Pedobacter ginsengisoli, a Gram-negative bacterium.
- Phycicoccus ginsengisoli, a Gram-positive bacterium.
- Pusillimonas ginsengisoli, a Gram-negative bacterium.
