= Pandoraea faecigallinarum =

Scientific classification
- Domain: Bacteria
- Kingdom: Pseudomonadati
- Phylum: Pseudomonadota
- Class: Betaproteobacteria
- Order: Burkholderiales
- Family: Burkholderiaceae
- Genus: Pandoraea
- Species: P. faecigallinarum

Binomial name
- Pandoraea faecigallinarum Sahin et al. 2011

Type strain
- CCM 2766, DSM 23572, KOx, NBRC 106092, T.S. Chandra KOx

Species of bacterium

Pandoraea faecigallinarum is a Gram-negative, aerobic, non-spore-forming bacterium from the genus Pandoraea, isolated from chicken feces.
