= Paraburkholderia oxyphila =

Scientific classification
- Domain: Bacteria
- Kingdom: Pseudomonadati
- Phylum: Pseudomonadota
- Class: Betaproteobacteria
- Order: Burkholderiales
- Family: Burkholderiaceae
- Genus: Paraburkholderia
- Species: P. oxyphila

Binomial name
- Paraburkholderia oxyphila (Otsuka et al. 2011) Sawana et al. 2015

Type strain
- DSM 22550; NBRC 105797; OX-01

Synonyms
- Burkholderia oxyphila Otsuka et al. 2011

Species of bacterium

Paraburkholderia oxyphila is a gram-negative, aerobic, non-spore-forming, non motile, rod-shaped bacterium from the genus Paraburkholderia and the family Burkholderiaceae which was isolated from acidic forest soil.
