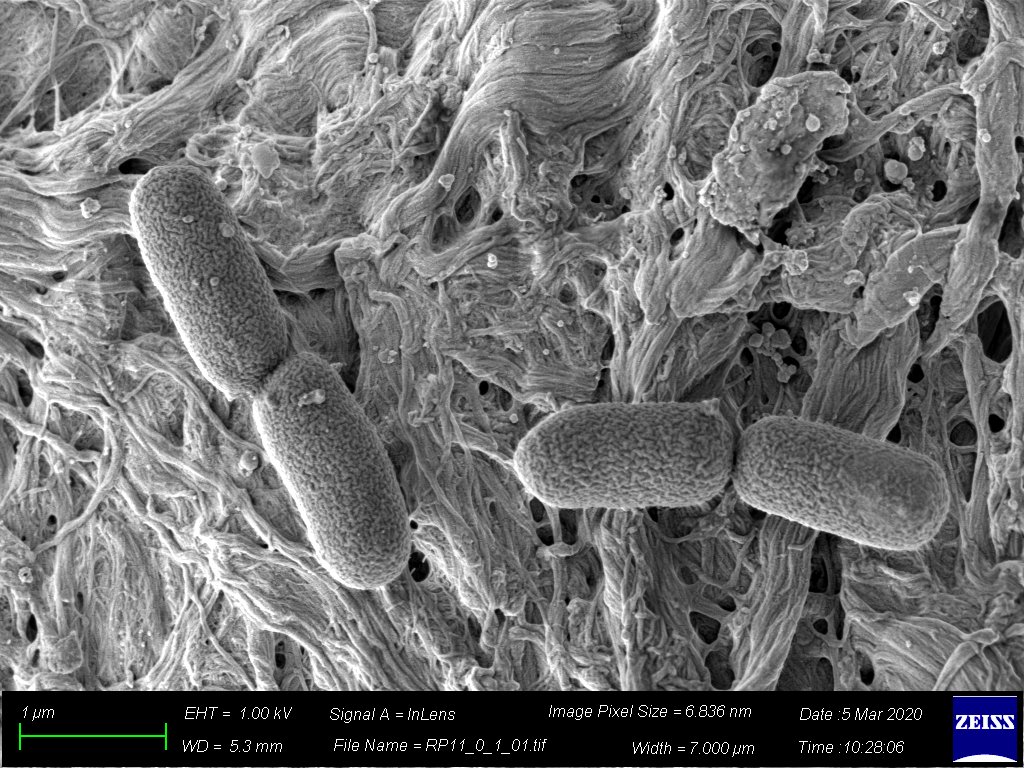
- A scanning electron micrograph of two replicating cells of Paraburkholderia madseniana RP11 against a backdrop of cellulose fibers

Scientific classification
- Domain: Bacteria
- Kingdom: Pseudomonadati
- Phylum: Pseudomonadota
- Class: Betaproteobacteria
- Order: Burkholderiales
- Family: Burkholderiaceae
- Genus: Paraburkholderia
- Species: P. madseniana

Binomial name
- Paraburkholderia madseniana Wilhelm et al. 2020

Type strain
- DSM 110123; LMG 31517; RP11

= Paraburkholderia madseniana =

Species of bacterium

Paraburkholderia madseniana is a Gram-negative bacterium belonging to the genus Paraburkholderia. The type strain is P. madseniana RP11^{T}, which was isolated from forest soil near Ithaca, NY, in 2016. The species was named in honor of Gene Madsen, a Professor at Cornell University, in recognition of his contributions to the field of environmental microbiology. The species is notable for its capacity to degrade phenolic compounds and its involvement in the priming effect.
