= Paraburkholderia hospita =

Scientific classification
- Domain: Bacteria
- Kingdom: Pseudomonadati
- Phylum: Pseudomonadota
- Class: Betaproteobacteria
- Order: Burkholderiales
- Family: Burkholderiaceae
- Genus: Paraburkholderia
- Species: P. hospita

Binomial name
- Paraburkholderia hospita (Goris et al. 2003) Sawana et al. 2015

Type strain
- CCUG 43658; DSM 17164; LMG 20598

Synonyms
- Burkholderia hospita Goris et al. 2003

Species of bacterium

Paraburkholderia hospita is a species of bacteria in the phylum Pseudomonadota.
