= Paraburkholderia caribensis =

Scientific classification
- Domain: Bacteria
- Kingdom: Pseudomonadati
- Phylum: Pseudomonadota
- Class: Betaproteobacteria
- Order: Burkholderiales
- Family: Burkholderiaceae
- Genus: Paraburkholderia
- Species: P. caribensis

Binomial name
- Paraburkholderia caribensis (Achouak et al. 1999) Sawana et al. 2015

Type strain
- CCUG 42847; CIP 106784; DSM 13236; LMG 18531; MWAP64

Synonyms
- Burkholderia caribensis Achouak et al. 1999

Species of bacterium

Paraburkholderia caribensis is a species of Pseudomonadota. The specific name caribensis refers to the Caribbean Islands, where the bacterium was first found.
