= Pandoraea sputorum =

Scientific classification
- Domain: Bacteria
- Kingdom: Pseudomonadati
- Phylum: Pseudomonadota
- Class: Betaproteobacteria
- Order: Burkholderiales
- Family: Burkholderiaceae
- Genus: Pandoraea
- Species: P. sputorum

Binomial name
- Pandoraea sputorum Coenye et al. 2000

Type strain
- ATCC BAA-64, AU00124, CCM 4980, CCUG 39682, CCUG 45026, CCUG 45206, CIP 106624, CIP 107268, Coenye R-3126, DSM 16584, LMG 18819

Species of bacterium

Pandoraea sputorum is a Gram-negative, nonfermenting bacterium from the genus Pandoraea, isolated from the sputum of a patient who suffered on cystic fibrosis. P. sputorum can deteriorate the lung function if it is not treated.
