= Cupriavidus campinensis =

Scientific classification
- Domain: Bacteria
- Kingdom: Pseudomonadati
- Phylum: Pseudomonadota
- Class: Betaproteobacteria
- Order: Burkholderiales
- Family: Burkholderiaceae
- Genus: Cupriavidus
- Species: C. campinensis

Binomial name
- Cupriavidus campinensis Vandamme and Coenye 2004

Type strain
- ATCC BAA-700, BCRC 17472, CCRC 17472, CCUG 44526, CIP 107177, DSM 17293, KCTC 12955, LMG 19282, Mergeay WS2, WS2

Synonyms
- Wautersia campinensis; Ralstonia campinensis

Species of bacterium

Cupriavidus campinensis is a gram-negative soil bacterium of the genus Cupriavidus and the family Burkholderiaceae which was isolated in northeast Belgium. C. campinensis species were found to be highly resistant to heavy metals and antibiotics due to their genomic potentials
