= Chitinimonas taiwanensis =

Scientific classification
- Domain: Bacteria
- Kingdom: Pseudomonadati
- Phylum: Pseudomonadota
- Class: Betaproteobacteria
- Order: Burkholderiales
- Family: Burkholderiaceae
- Genus: Chitinimonas
- Species: C. taiwanensis

Binomial name
- Chitinimonas taiwanensis Chang et al. 2004

Type strain
- BCRC 17210, CCRC 17210, DSM 18899, LMG 22011

Species of bacterium

Chitinimonas taiwanensis is a Gram-negative, chitinolytic, catalase- and oxidase-positive motile bacterium with a single flagellum of the genus Chitinimonas and the family Burkholderiaceae which was isolated from the surface of a freshwater pond for shrimp (Macrobrachium rosenbergii) in Pingtung City in southern Taiwan.
