= Sphingosinicella humi =

Scientific classification
- Domain: Bacteria
- Kingdom: Pseudomonadati
- Phylum: Pseudomonadota
- Class: Alphaproteobacteria
- Order: Sphingomonadales
- Family: Sphingomonadaceae
- Genus: Sphingosinicella
- Species: S. humi

Binomial name
- Sphingosinicella humi Qiao et al. 2019

Gram-negative, rod-shaped bacterium that is a member of the genus Sphingosinicella

Sphingosinicella humi is a Gram-negative, rod-shaped bacterium that is a member of the genus Sphingosinicella. It is strictly aerobic, flagellated, and motile. Colonies are white, convex, circular, and slightly transparent. S. humi grows in the presence of arsenic and sodium chloride. The optimum temperature for growth is 28˚C, but S. humi can grow within the temperature range of 16-42 ˚C. The organism can grow in a pH range of 6.5-9. Culture growth occurs on Reasoner’s 2A agar (R2A agar) medium and in 1/10 tryptic soy broth.

== Metabolism ==
S. humi reduces nitrogen. It is capable of hydrolyzing tween 20, arginine, and urea. It is oxidase positive, meaning that it produces cytochrome c oxidases. It is catalase negative, suggesting that it is incapable of forming catalase, and is therefore incapable of neutralizing hydrogen peroxide. S. humi can also produce acid from D-galactose and assimilate propionate, L-proline, acetate, D-galactose, and valerianate.

== Genomic Sequencing ==
The genome of S. humi was sequenced using 16S rRNA. The chromosome of S. humi is 3.0Mb long, contains 4 contigs, and is predicted to be composed of 2981 genes. The DNA G-C content range of S. humi is 65.9 mol%. S. humi was significantly similar to four strains of Sphingosinicella, specifically 97% similar to Sphingosinicella vermicomposti YC7378, 96.1% similar to Sphingosinicella xenopeptidilytica 3-2W4, 96% similar to Sphingosinicella microcystineivorans Y2, and 95.9% similar to Sphingosinicella soli KSL-125. The genomic similarities aid in the determination of S. humi as part of the genus Sphingosinicella.

== Ecology ==
S. humi was isolated from arsenic contaminated farmland red soil from the village, Jiaotain, in the city of Daye, Hubei Province, People’s Republic of China. The soil sample had an arsenic concentration of 35.8 mg/kg and a pH of 6.95.
