= Cupriavidus numazuensis =

Scientific classification
- Domain: Bacteria
- Kingdom: Pseudomonadati
- Phylum: Pseudomonadota
- Class: Betaproteobacteria
- Order: Burkholderiales
- Family: Burkholderiaceae
- Genus: Cupriavidus
- Species: C. numazuensis

Binomial name
- Cupriavidus numazuensis Martínez-Aguilar et al. 2013

Type strain
- CIP 108892, DSM 15562, Kageyama TE26, LMG 26411, NBRC 100056, TE26

Synonyms
- Ralstonia numaduensis, Wautersia numadzuensis

Species of bacterium

Cupriavidus numazuensis is a bacterium of the genus Cupriavidus and family Burkholderiaceae. It was renamed from Wautersia numazuensis.
