= Paraburkholderia heleia =

Scientific classification
- Domain: Bacteria
- Kingdom: Pseudomonadati
- Phylum: Pseudomonadota
- Class: Betaproteobacteria
- Order: Burkholderiales
- Family: Burkholderiaceae
- Genus: Paraburkholderia
- Species: P. heleia

Binomial name
- Paraburkholderia heleia (Aizawa et al. 2010) Sawana et al. 2015

Type strain
- KACC 16324; NBRC 101817; NBRC 108170; SA41; VTCC D6-7

Synonyms
- Burkholderia heleia Aizawa et al. 2010

Species of bacterium

Paraburkholderia heleia is a gram-negative, nitrogen-fixing, aerobic, non-spore-forming, rod-shaped bacterium from the genus Paraburkholderia and the family Burkholderiaceae which was isolated from the Chinese water chestnut Eleocharis dulcis in acid sulfate soil areas of Vietnam. Colonies of Burkholderia heleia are pale yellow.
