= Paraburkholderia denitrificans =

Scientific classification
- Domain: Bacteria
- Kingdom: Pseudomonadati
- Phylum: Pseudomonadota
- Class: Betaproteobacteria
- Order: Burkholderiales
- Family: Burkholderiaceae
- Genus: Paraburkholderia
- Species: P. denitrificans

Binomial name
- Paraburkholderia denitrificans (Lee et al. 2013) Sawana et al. 2015

Type strain
- DSM 24336; KACC 12733; KIS30-44

Synonyms
- Burkholderia denitrificans Lee et al. 2013

Species of bacterium

Paraburkholderia denitrificans is a gram-negative, bacterium from the genus Paraburkholderia and the family Burkholderiaceae which was isolated from wet forest soil on the island of Liancourt Rocks. Paraburkholderia denitrificans has the ability to reduced nitrate to nitrogen gas.
