= Caballeronia nigropunctata =

"Candidatus Caballeronia nigropunctata"

Scientific classification (Candidatus)
- Domain: Bacteria
- Phylum: Pseudomonadota
- Class: Betaproteobacteria
- Order: Burkholderiales
- Family: Burkholderiaceae
- Genus: Caballeronia
- Species: "Ca. C. nigropunctata"

Binomial name
- "Candidatus Caballeronia nigropunctata"

Synonyms
- "Candidatus Burkholderia nigropunctata" Van Oevelen et al. 2004

Species of bacterium

"Candidatus Caballeronia nigropunctata" is a Candidatus species of bacteria from the genus Caballeronia and the family Burkholderiaceae. "Candidatus Caballeronia nigropunctata" is an endosymbiont of the plant Psychotria nigropunctata.
