= Paraburkholderia phymatum =

Scientific classification
- Domain: Bacteria
- Kingdom: Pseudomonadati
- Phylum: Pseudomonadota
- Class: Betaproteobacteria
- Order: Burkholderiales
- Family: Burkholderiaceae
- Genus: Paraburkholderia
- Species: P. phymatum

Binomial name
- Paraburkholderia phymatum (Vandamme et al. 2003) Sawana et al. 2015

Type strain
- CCUG 47179; DSM 17167; LMG 21445; STM 815

Synonyms
- Burkholderia phymatum Vandamme et al. 2003

Species of bacterium

Paraburkholderia phymatum is a species of bacteria that is capable of symbiotic nitrogen fixation with the legumes Machaerium lunatum and Mimosa pudica. Recently, the genome (8.67 Mbp long) was sequenced. It consists of two chromosomes (3.49 and 2.7 Mbp), a megaplasmid (1.9 Mbp), and a plasmid hosting the symbiotic functions (0.56 Mbp).
