= Limnobacter litoralis =

Scientific classification
- Domain: Bacteria
- Kingdom: Pseudomonadati
- Phylum: Pseudomonadota
- Class: Betaproteobacteria
- Order: Burkholderiales
- Family: Burkholderiaceae
- Genus: Limnobacter
- Species: L. litoralis

Binomial name
- Limnobacter litoralis Lu et al. 2011

Type strain
- CIP 109929, KP1-19, LMG 24869, NBRC 105857

Species of bacterium

Limnobacter litoralis is a Gram-negative, oxidase- and catalase-positive, non-spore-forming, thiosulfate-oxidizing, anaerobic bacterium of the genus Limnobacter and family Burkholderiaceae, isolated from a 22-year-old volcanic deposit on the island of Miyake-jima in Japan.
