= Chitinimonas viridis =

Scientific classification
- Domain: Bacteria
- Kingdom: Pseudomonadati
- Phylum: Pseudomonadota
- Class: Betaproteobacteria
- Order: Burkholderiales
- Family: Burkholderiaceae
- Genus: Chitinimonas
- Species: C. viridis

Binomial name
- Chitinimonas viridis Joung et al. 2014

Type strain
- CECT 7703, HMD2169, KCTC 22839

Species of bacterium

Chitinimonas viridis is a Gram-negative, rod-shaped bacterium species from the genus Chitinimonas which has been isolated from an artificial lake in Korea.
