= Caballeronia humi =

Scientific classification
- Domain: Bacteria
- Kingdom: Pseudomonadati
- Phylum: Pseudomonadota
- Class: Betaproteobacteria
- Order: Burkholderiales
- Family: Burkholderiaceae
- Genus: Caballeronia
- Species: C. humi

Binomial name
- Caballeronia humi (Vandamme et al. 2013) Dobritsa and Samadpour 2016

Type strain
- CCUG 63059^{T} LMG 22934^{T} RA1-5^{T}

Synonyms
- Burkholderia humi Vandamme et al. 2013; Paraburkholderia humi (Vandamme et al. 2013) Sawana et al. 2015

Species of bacterium

Caballeronia humi is a Gram-negative, aerobic, non-motile bacterium from the genus Burkholderia and the family Burkholderiaceae which was isolated from peat soil in Russia.
