= Paraburkholderia caledonica =

Scientific classification
- Domain: Bacteria
- Kingdom: Pseudomonadati
- Phylum: Pseudomonadota
- Class: Betaproteobacteria
- Order: Burkholderiales
- Family: Burkholderiaceae
- Genus: Paraburkholderia
- Species: P. caledonica

Binomial name
- Paraburkholderia caledonica (Coenye et al. 2001) Sawana et al. 2015

Type strain
- CCUG 42236; CIP 107098; DSM 17062; JCM 21561; LMG 19076; NBRC 102488; W50D

Synonyms
- Burkholderia caledonica Coenye et al. 2001

Species of bacterium

Paraburkholderia caledonica is a species of Pseudomonadota.
