= Paraburkholderia diazotrophica =

Scientific classification
- Domain: Bacteria
- Kingdom: Pseudomonadati
- Phylum: Pseudomonadota
- Class: Betaproteobacteria
- Order: Burkholderiales
- Family: Burkholderiaceae
- Genus: Paraburkholderia
- Species: P. diazotrophica

Binomial name
- Paraburkholderia diazotrophica (Sheu et al. 2013) Sawana et al. 2015

Type strain
- BCRC 80259; JPY461; KCTC 23308; LMG 26031; NKMU-JPY461

Synonyms
- Burkholderia diazotrophica Sheu et al. 2013

Species of bacterium

Paraburkholderia diazotrophica is a gram-negative, catalase and oxidase-positive, aerobic, non-spore-forming, motile bacterium from the genus Paraburkholderia and the family Burkholderiaceae which was isolated from the nitrogen-fixing nodules on the roots of a Mimosa. Colonies of Paraburkholderia diazotrophica are yellow pigmented.
