= Paraburkholderia dilworthii =

Scientific classification
- Domain: Bacteria
- Kingdom: Pseudomonadati
- Phylum: Pseudomonadota
- Class: Betaproteobacteria
- Order: Burkholderiales
- Family: Burkholderiaceae
- Genus: Paraburkholderia
- Species: P. dilworthii

Binomial name
- Paraburkholderia dilworthii (De Meyer et al. 2014) Sawana et al. 2015

Type strain
- HAMBI 3353; LMG 27173; WSM3556

Synonyms
- Burkholderia dilworthii De Meyer et al. 2014

Species of bacterium

Paraburkholderia dilworthii is a Gram-negative, rod-shaped bacterium from the genus Paraburkholderia and the family Burkholderiaceae. It was isolated from the root nodules of the plant Lebeckia ambigua.
