= Cupriavidus plantarum =

Scientific classification
- Domain: Bacteria
- Kingdom: Pseudomonadati
- Phylum: Pseudomonadota
- Class: Betaproteobacteria
- Order: Burkholderiales
- Family: Burkholderiaceae
- Genus: Cupriavidus
- Species: C. plantarum

Binomial name
- Cupriavidus plantarum Estrada-de Los Santos et al. 2015

Type strain
- CIP 110328, ASC-64, MA1-1za, MA1-4a, SLV-2261, LMG 26296

Species of bacterium

Cupriavidus plantarum is a bacterium from the genus of Cupriavidus which has been isolated from the rhizospheres of the plants agave, maize and sorghum.
