= Caballeronia rigidae =

"Candidatus Caballeronia rigidae"

Scientific classification (Candidatus)
- Domain: Bacteria
- Phylum: Pseudomonadota
- Class: Betaproteobacteria
- Order: Burkholderiales
- Family: Burkholderiaceae
- Genus: Caballeronia
- Species: "Ca. C. rigidae"

Binomial name
- "Candidatus Caballeronia rigidae"

Synonyms
- "Candidatus Burkholderia rigidae" Lemaire et al. 2012

Species of bacterium

"Candidatus Caballeronia rigidae" is a bacterium from the genus Caballeronia and the family Burkholderiaceae. Candidatus Burkholderia rigidae is an endosymbiont.
