= Streptomyces mimosae =

Scientific classification
- Domain: Bacteria
- Kingdom: Bacillati
- Phylum: Actinomycetota
- Class: Actinomycetia
- Order: Streptomycetales
- Family: Streptomycetaceae
- Genus: Streptomyces
- Species: S. mimosae

Binomial name
- Streptomyces mimosae Klykleung et al. 2020

Type strain
- 3MP-10

Species of bacterium

Streptomyces mimosae is a bacterium species from the genus of Streptomyces which has been isolated from the root of a Mimosa pudica plant in Thailand.

== See also ==
- List of Streptomyces species
