= Paraburkholderia sediminicola =

Scientific classification
- Domain: Bacteria
- Kingdom: Pseudomonadati
- Phylum: Pseudomonadota
- Class: Betaproteobacteria
- Order: Burkholderiales
- Family: Burkholderiaceae
- Genus: Paraburkholderia
- Species: P. sediminicola

Binomial name
- Paraburkholderia sediminicola (Lim et al. 2008) Sawana et al. 2015

Type strain
- DSM 21400; HU2-65W; KCTC 22086; LMG 24238

Synonyms
- Burkholderia sediminicola Lim et al. 2008

Species of bacterium

Paraburkholderia sediminicola is a gram-negative, catalase and oxidase-positive rod-shaped motile bacterium from the genus Paraburkholderia and the family Burkholderiaceae which was isolated from freshwater sediment. Colonies of Paraburkholderia sediminicola are creamy white in colour.
