= Cupriavidus pauculus =

Scientific classification
- Domain: Bacteria
- Kingdom: Pseudomonadati
- Phylum: Pseudomonadota
- Class: Betaproteobacteria
- Order: Burkholderiales
- Family: Burkholderiaceae
- Genus: Cupriavidus
- Species: C. pauculus

Binomial name
- Cupriavidus pauculus Vandamme and Coenye 2004

Type strain
- ATCC 700817, BCRC 17496, CCM 4867, CCRC 17496, CCUG 12507, CDC E6793, CIP 105943, DSM 17313, HA4T, JCM 11286, LMG 3244

Synonyms
- Ralstonia paucula, Wautersia paucula

Species of bacterium

Cupriavidus pauculus is a Gram-negative, nonfermentative, motile bacterium of the genus Cupriavidus and family Burkholderiaceae isolated from water from ultrafiltration systems and bottled mineral water. C. pauculus is associated with human infections.
