= Chitinimonas koreensis =

Scientific classification
- Domain: Bacteria
- Kingdom: Pseudomonadati
- Phylum: Pseudomonadota
- Class: Betaproteobacteria
- Order: Burkholderiales
- Family: Burkholderiaceae
- Genus: Chitinimonas
- Species: C. koreensis

Binomial name
- Chitinimonas koreensis Kim et al. 2006

Type strain
- CIP 109380, DSM 17726, KACC 11467, R-2 A43-10

Species of bacterium

Chitinimonas koreensis is a Gram-negative, catalase- and oxidase-positive motile bacterium with a single flagellum of the genus Chitinimonas and the family Burkholderiaceae which was isolated from greenhouse soil in Korea.
