= Paraburkholderia graminis =

Scientific classification
- Domain: Bacteria
- Kingdom: Pseudomonadati
- Phylum: Pseudomonadota
- Class: Betaproteobacteria
- Order: Burkholderiales
- Family: Burkholderiaceae
- Genus: Paraburkholderia
- Species: P. graminis

Binomial name
- Paraburkholderia graminis (Viallard et al. 1998) Sawana et al. 2015

Type strain
- ATCC 700544; C4D1M; CCUG 42231; CCUG 44231; CIP 106649; DSM 17151; LMG 18924

Synonyms
- Burkholderia graminis Viallard et al. 1998

Species of bacterium

Paraburkholderia graminis is a species of bacteria isolated from agricultural soils in France and Australia.
