= Paraburkholderia sabiae =

Scientific classification
- Domain: Bacteria
- Kingdom: Pseudomonadati
- Phylum: Pseudomonadota
- Class: Betaproteobacteria
- Order: Burkholderiales
- Family: Burkholderiaceae
- Genus: Paraburkholderia
- Species: P. sabiae

Binomial name
- Paraburkholderia sabiae (Chen et al. 2008) Sawana et al. 2015

Type strain
- BCRC 17587; Br3407; DSM 23623; LMG 24235

Synonyms
- Burkholderia sabiae Chen et al. 2008

Species of bacterium

Paraburkholderia sabiae is a Gram-negative, catalase- and oxidase-positive non-spore-forming bacterium of the genus Paraburkholderia and the family Burkholderiaceae, which was isolated from the nitrogen-fixing nodules on the roots of Mimosa caesalpiniifolia in Brazil.
