= Paraburkholderia nodosa =

Scientific classification
- Domain: Bacteria
- Kingdom: Pseudomonadati
- Phylum: Pseudomonadota
- Class: Betaproteobacteria
- Order: Burkholderiales
- Family: Burkholderiaceae
- Genus: Paraburkholderia
- Species: P. nodosa

Binomial name
- Paraburkholderia nodosa (Chen et al. 2007) Sawana et al. 2015

Type strain
- BCRC 17575; Br3437; DSM 21604; LMG 23741

Synonyms
- Burkholderia nodosa Chen et al. 2007

Species of bacterium

Paraburkholderia nodosa is a gram-negative, catalase and oxidase-positive, non-spore-forming, bacterium from the genus Paraburkholderia and the family Burkholderiaceae which was isolated from nitrogen-fixing nodules from roots of Mimosa bimucronata and Mimosa scabrella.
