= Chitinimonas prasina =

Scientific classification
- Domain: Bacteria
- Kingdom: Pseudomonadati
- Phylum: Pseudomonadota
- Class: Betaproteobacteria
- Order: Burkholderiales
- Family: Burkholderiaceae
- Genus: Chitinimonas
- Species: C. prasina

Binomial name
- Chitinimonas prasina Li et al. 2014

Species of bacterium

Chitinimonas prasina is a Gram-negative, green pigmented, aerobic bacterium species from the genus Chitinimonas which has been isolated from lake water in Xiamen in the Fujian Province in China.
