= Caballeronia glathei =

Scientific classification
- Domain: Bacteria
- Kingdom: Pseudomonadati
- Phylum: Pseudomonadota
- Class: Betaproteobacteria
- Order: Burkholderiales
- Family: Burkholderiaceae
- Genus: Caballeronia
- Species: C. glathei

Binomial name
- Caballeronia glathei (Zolg and Ottow 1975) Dobritsa and Samadpour 2016

Synonyms
- Pseudomonas glathei Zolg and Ottow 1975; Burkholderia glathei (Zolg and Ottow 1975) Vandamme et al. 1997; Paraburkholderia glathei (Zolg and Ottow 1975) Sawana et al. 2015

Species of bacterium

Caballeronia glathei is a Gram-negative soil bacterium. It is motile by using one polar flagellum.
