= Paraburkholderia rhynchosiae =

Scientific classification
- Domain: Bacteria
- Kingdom: Pseudomonadati
- Phylum: Pseudomonadota
- Class: Betaproteobacteria
- Order: Burkholderiales
- Family: Burkholderiaceae
- Genus: Paraburkholderia
- Species: P. rhynchosiae

Binomial name
- Paraburkholderia rhynchosiae (De Meyer et al. 2013) Sawana et al. 2015

Type strain
- HAMBI 3354; LMG 27174; WSM3937

Synonyms
- Burkholderia rhynchosiae De Meyer et al. 2013

Species of bacterium

Paraburkholderia rhynchosiae is a Gram-negative, rod-shaped bacterium from the genus Paraburkholderia and the family Burkholderiaceae which was isolated from root nodules from the plant Rhynchosia ferulifolia in South Africa.
