= Paraburkholderia silvatlantica =

Scientific classification
- Domain: Bacteria
- Kingdom: Pseudomonadati
- Phylum: Pseudomonadota
- Class: Betaproteobacteria
- Order: Burkholderiales
- Family: Burkholderiaceae
- Genus: Paraburkholderia
- Species: P. silvatlantica

Binomial name
- Paraburkholderia silvatlantica (Perin et al. 2006) Sawana et al. 2015

Type strain
- ATCC BAA-1244; DSM 21840; LMG 23149; SRMrh-20

Synonyms
- Burkholderia silvatlantica Perin et al. 2006

Species of bacterium

Paraburkholderia silvatlantica is a gram-negative, catalase and oxidase-positive nitrogen-fixing bacterium from the genus Paraburkholderia and the family Burkholderiaceae which was isolated from the rhizosphere of maize in Seropédica in Rio de Janeiro. Colonies of Paraburkholderia silvatlantica are cream-coloured with yellow in the centre.
