= Caballeronia mamillata =

"Candidatus Caballeronia mamillata"

Scientific classification (Candidatus)
- Domain: Bacteria
- Phylum: Pseudomonadota
- Class: Betaproteobacteria
- Order: Burkholderiales
- Family: Burkholderiaceae
- Genus: Caballeronia
- Species: "Ca. C. mamillata"

Binomial name
- "Candidatus Caballeronia mamillata"

Synonyms
- "Candidatus Burkholderia mamillata" Lemaire et al. 2011

Species of bacterium

"Candidatus Caballeronia mamillata" is a bacterium from the genus of Burkholderia and the family Burkholderiaceae.
