= Caballeronia crenata =

"Candidatus Burkholderia crenata"

Scientific classification (Candidatus)
- Domain: Bacteria
- Phylum: Pseudomonadota
- Class: Betaproteobacteria
- Order: Burkholderiales
- Family: Burkholderiaceae
- Genus: Caballeronia
- Species: "Ca. C. crenata"

Binomial name
- "Candidatus Caballeronia crenata"

Synonyms
- "Candidatus Burkholderia crenata" Lemaire et al. 2011

Species of bacterium

"Candidatus Caballeronia crenata" is a bacterium from the genus of Caballeronia and the family Burkholderiaceae.
