= Pandoraea apista =

Scientific classification
- Domain: Bacteria
- Kingdom: Pseudomonadati
- Phylum: Pseudomonadota
- Class: Betaproteobacteria
- Order: Burkholderiales
- Family: Burkholderiaceae
- Genus: Pandoraea
- Species: P. apista

Binomial name
- Pandoraea apista Coenye et al. 2000

Type strain
- ATCC BAA-61, CCM 4976, CCUG 38412, CIP 106627, DSM 16535, LMG 16407, NCTC 13158

Species of bacterium

Pandoraea apista is a Gram-negative, catalase-positive, aerobic, non-spore-forming, motile bacterium with a single polar flagellum, from the genus Pandoraea. The Strain CCUG 38412 was isolated from the sputum of a cystic fibrosis patient in Denmark. Pandoraea apista can cause lung disease, such as chronic lung infections, in patients who suffer from cystic fibrosis.

== Etymology ==
Pandoraea apista is named from Pandora's box and the Greek word apistos which means disloyal or treacherous.
