= Paraburkholderia sartisoli =

Scientific classification
- Domain: Bacteria
- Kingdom: Pseudomonadati
- Phylum: Pseudomonadota
- Class: Betaproteobacteria
- Order: Burkholderiales
- Family: Burkholderiaceae
- Genus: Paraburkholderia
- Species: P. sartisoli

Binomial name
- Paraburkholderia sartisoli (Vanlaere et al. 2008) Sawana et al. 2015

Type strain
- CCUG 53604; DSM 23088; ICMP 13529; LMG 24000; RP 007

Synonyms
- Burkholderia sartisoli Vanlaere et al. 2008

Species of bacterium

Paraburkholderia sartisoli is a gram-negative, aerobic catalase and oxidase-positive rod-shaped bacterium from the genus Paraburkholderia and the family Burkholderiaceae which was isolated from polycyclic aromatic hydrocarbon contaminated soil in New Zealand.
