= Cupriavidus-1 RNA motif =

Cupriavidus-1
- Consensus secondary structure and sequence conservation of Cupriavidus-1 RNA

Identifiers
- Symbol: Cupriavidus-1
- Rfam: RF02949

Other data
- RNA type: Gene; sRNA
- SO: SO:0001263
- PDB structures: PDBe

The Cupriavidus-1 RNA motif is a conserved RNA structure that was discovered by bioinformatics. Cupriavidus-1 motifs are found in Betaproteobacteria, within Cupriavidus.

It is ambiguous whether Cupriavidus-1 RNAs function as cis-regulatory elements or whether they operate in trans. In some cases they are located between genes encode subunits of ATP synthase, but there are too few Cupriavidus-1 RNAs that are known in order to determine whether this association has biological significance.
