= Cupriavidus yeoncheonensis =

Scientific classification
- Domain: Bacteria
- Kingdom: Pseudomonadati
- Phylum: Pseudomonadota
- Class: Betaproteobacteria
- Order: Burkholderiales
- Family: Burkholderiaceae
- Genus: Cupriavidus
- Species: C. yeoncheonensis

Binomial name
- Cupriavidus yeoncheonensis Singh et al. 2015

Type strain
- DCY86, JCM 19890, KCTC 42053

Synonyms
- Cupriavidus yeoncheonense

Species of bacterium

Cupriavidus yeoncheonensis is a Gram-negative and strictly aerobic bacterium from the genus of Cupriavidus which has been isolated from soil from a ginseng field from Yeoncheon in Korea.
