= Pandoraea pnomenusa =

Scientific classification
- Domain: Bacteria
- Kingdom: Pseudomonadati
- Phylum: Pseudomonadota
- Class: Betaproteobacteria
- Order: Burkholderiales
- Family: Burkholderiaceae
- Genus: Pandoraea
- Species: P. pnomenusa

Binomial name
- Pandoraea pnomenusa Coenye et al. 2000

Type strain
- ATCC BAA-63, C1513, CCM 4978, CCUG 38742, CIP 106626, DSM 16536, Govan C1513, LMG 18087, NCTC 13160

Species of bacterium

Pandoraea pnomenusa is a Gram-negative bacterium from the genus Pandoraea.
