= Paraburkholderia phytofirmans =

Scientific classification
- Domain: Bacteria
- Kingdom: Pseudomonadati
- Phylum: Pseudomonadota
- Class: Betaproteobacteria
- Order: Burkholderiales
- Family: Burkholderiaceae
- Genus: Paraburkholderia
- Species: P. phytofirmans

Binomial name
- Paraburkholderia phytofirmans (Sessitsch et al. 2005) Sawana et al. 2015

Type strain
- CCUG 49060; DSM 17436; LMG 22146; PsJN

Synonyms
- Burkholderia phytofirmans Sessitsch et al. 2005

Species of bacterium

Paraburkholderia phytofirmans is a species of bacteria. They have been reported to colonize endophytic tissues of hybrid white spruce (Picea glauca x engelmannii) and lodgepole pine with a strong potential to perform biological nitrogen fixation and plant growth promotion.
