= Paraburkholderia ferrariae =

Scientific classification
- Domain: Bacteria
- Kingdom: Pseudomonadati
- Phylum: Pseudomonadota
- Class: Betaproteobacteria
- Order: Burkholderiales
- Family: Burkholderiaceae
- Genus: Paraburkholderia
- Species: P. ferrariae

Binomial name
- Paraburkholderia ferrariae (Valverde et al. 2006) Sawana et al. 2015

Type strain
- CECT 171; DSM 18251; FeGl01; LMG 23612

Synonyms
- Burkholderia ferrariae Valverde et al. 2006

Species of bacterium

Paraburkholderia ferrariae is a gram-negative, catalase and oxidase-positive, non-spore-forming, bacterium from the genus Paraburkholderia and the family Burkholderiaceae which was isolated from a high phosphorus iron ore in the Minas Gerais State in Brazil. Paraburkholderia ferrariae has the ability to solubilize highly insoluble phosphatic minerals.
