= Pandoraea pulmonicola =

Scientific classification
- Domain: Bacteria
- Kingdom: Pseudomonadati
- Phylum: Pseudomonadota
- Class: Betaproteobacteria
- Order: Burkholderiales
- Family: Burkholderiaceae
- Genus: Pandoraea
- Species: P. pulmonicola

Binomial name
- Pandoraea pulmonicola Coenye et al. 2000

Type strain
- ATCC BAA-62, CCM 4979, CCUG 38759, CIP 106625, DSM 16583, FC330, HI 2094, LMG 18106, NCTC 13159

Species of bacterium

Pandoraea pulmonicola is a Gram-negative, non-spore-forming, motile bacterium with a single polar flagellum, from the genus Pandoraea. P. pulmonicola has been isolated from respiratory samples of patients with cystic fibrosis and other respiratory diseases. P. pulmonicola is a part of the Burkholderia cepacia complex, which is a group of bacteria commonly associated with infections in individuals with compromised immune systems.
