= Paraburkholderia eburnea =

Scientific classification
- Domain: Bacteria
- Kingdom: Pseudomonadati
- Phylum: Pseudomonadota
- Class: Betaproteobacteria
- Order: Burkholderiales
- Family: Burkholderiaceae
- Genus: Paraburkholderia
- Species: P. eburnea

Binomial name
- Paraburkholderia eburnea (Kang et al. 2014) Sawana et al. 2015

Type strain
- DSM 29414; JCM 18070; KEMC 7302-065; RR11

Synonyms
- Burkholderia eburnea Kang et al. 2014; Paraburkholderia eburne (Kang et al. 2014) Sawana et al. 2015

Species of bacterium

Paraburkholderia eburnea is a Gram-negative, aerobic, non-spore-forming bacterium from the genus Paraburkholderia and the family Burkholderiaceae which was isolated from peat soil.
