= Paraburkholderia sprentiae =

Scientific classification
- Domain: Bacteria
- Kingdom: Pseudomonadati
- Phylum: Pseudomonadota
- Class: Betaproteobacteria
- Order: Burkholderiales
- Family: Burkholderiaceae
- Genus: Paraburkholderia
- Species: P. sprentiae

Binomial name
- Paraburkholderia sprentiae (De Meyer et al. 2013) Sawana et al. 2015

Type strain
- HAMBI 3357; LMG 27175; WSM5005

Synonyms
- Burkholderia sprentiae De Meyer et al. 2013

Species of bacterium

Paraburkholderia sprentiae is a Gram-negative, rod-shaped bacterium from the genus Paraburkholderia and the family Burkholderiaceae which was isolated from root nodules from the plant Lebeckia ambigua in South Africa.

The species was named in honor of Professor Janet Sprent of Dundee University, in recognition of her work on nitrogen fixation.
