= Paraburkholderia bannensis =

Scientific classification
- Domain: Bacteria
- Kingdom: Pseudomonadati
- Phylum: Pseudomonadota
- Class: Betaproteobacteria
- Order: Burkholderiales
- Family: Burkholderiaceae
- Genus: Paraburkholderia
- Species: P. bannensis

Binomial name
- Paraburkholderia bannensis (Aizawa et al. 2011) Sawana et al. 2015

Type strain
- BCC 36998; E25; NBRC 103871

Synonyms
- Burkholderia bannensis Aizawa et al. 2011

Species of bacterium

Paraburkholderia bannensis is a Gram-negative, aerobic, non-spore-forming bacterium of the genus Paraburkholderia and the family Burkholderiaceae, which was isolated from highly acidic swamps from torpedo grass (Panicum repens) in Thailand. It has the ability to neutralize acid.
