= Caballeronia terrestris =

Scientific classification
- Domain: Bacteria
- Kingdom: Pseudomonadati
- Phylum: Pseudomonadota
- Class: Betaproteobacteria
- Order: Burkholderiales
- Family: Burkholderiaceae
- Genus: Caballeronia
- Species: C. terrestris

Binomial name
- Caballeronia terrestris (Vandamme et al. 2013) Dobritsa and Samadpour 2016

Type strain
- A13-11^{T} CCUG 63062^{T} LMG 22937^{T} ES 14^{T} Vandamme R-23321^{T}

Synonyms
- Burkholderia terrestris Vandamme et al. 2013

Species of bacterium

Caballeronia terrestris is a bacterium from the genus Burkholderia and family Burkholderiaceae.
