= Pandoraea vervacti =

Scientific classification
- Domain: Bacteria
- Kingdom: Pseudomonadati
- Phylum: Pseudomonadota
- Class: Betaproteobacteria
- Order: Burkholderiales
- Family: Burkholderiaceae
- Genus: Pandoraea
- Species: P. vervacti

Binomial name
- Pandoraea vervacti Sahin et al. 2011

Type strain
- CCM 7667, DSM 23571, NBRC 106088, NS15

Species of bacterium

Pandoraea vervacti is a Gram-negative, aerobic, non-spore-forming bacterium from the genus Pandoraea.
