= Cupriavidus respiraculi =

Scientific classification
- Domain: Bacteria
- Kingdom: Pseudomonadati
- Phylum: Pseudomonadota
- Class: Betaproteobacteria
- Order: Burkholderiales
- Family: Burkholderiaceae
- Genus: Cupriavidus
- Species: C. respiraculi

Binomial name
- Cupriavidus respiraculi Vandamme and Coenye 2004

Type strain
- AU3313, CCM 7175, CCUG 46809, CIP 108131, DSM 17358, J.J. LiPuma AU3313, LiPuma AU3313, LMG 21510, P. Vandamme R-16029, Vandamme R-16029, VTT E-072686

Synonyms
- Ralstonia respiraculi; Wautersia respiraculi

Species of bacterium

Cupriavidus respiraculi is a Gram-negative, nonfermenting bacterium of the genus Cupriavidus and family Burkholderiaceae. It has been isolated from cystic fibrosis patients.
