= Cupriavidus oxalaticus =

Scientific classification
- Domain: Bacteria
- Kingdom: Pseudomonadati
- Phylum: Pseudomonadota
- Class: Betaproteobacteria
- Order: Burkholderiales
- Family: Burkholderiaceae
- Genus: Cupriavidus
- Species: C. oxalaticus

Binomial name
- Cupriavidus oxalaticus (Sahin et al. 2000); Vandamme and Coenye 2004

Synonyms
- Wautersia oxalatica (Sahin et al. 2000) Vaneechoutte et al. 2004; Pseudomonas oxalaticus Khambata and Bhat 1953; Ralstonia oxalatica (ex Khambata and Bhat 1953) Sahin et al. 2000

Species of bacterium

Cupriavidus oxalaticus is a genus of bacteria that includes the former genus Wautersia.
