= SbcD RNA motif =

sbcD RNA
- Consensus secondary structure of sbcD RNAs

Identifiers
- Symbol: sbcD RNA
- Rfam: RF01757

Other data
- RNA type: sRNA
- Domain: Burkholderiaceae
- PDB structures: PDBe

The sbcD RNA motif is a conserved RNA structure identified using bioinformatics. sbc RNAs are found some species of bacteria classified under the family Burkholderiaceae, and usually reside in plasmids. They are always located in what might be the 5' untranslated regions of operons that include sbcD genes. sbcD genes are involved in DNA repair.
