= Caballeronia hispidae =

"Candidatus Caballeronia hispidae"

Scientific classification (Candidatus)
- Domain: Bacteria
- Phylum: Pseudomonadota
- Class: Betaproteobacteria
- Order: Burkholderiales
- Family: Burkholderiaceae
- Genus: Caballeronia
- Species: "Candidatus C. hispidae"

Binomial name
- "Candidatus Caballeronia hispidae"

Synonyms
- "Candidatus Burkholderia hispidae" Lemaire et al. 2012

Species of bacterium

"Candidatus Caballeronia hispidae" is a bacterium from the genus Caballeronia and the family Burkholderiaceae.
