= Paraburkholderia unamae =

Scientific classification
- Domain: Bacteria
- Kingdom: Pseudomonadati
- Phylum: Pseudomonadota
- Class: Betaproteobacteria
- Order: Burkholderiales
- Family: Burkholderiaceae
- Genus: Paraburkholderia
- Species: P. umamae

Binomial name
- Paraburkholderia umamae (Caballero-Mellado et al. 2004) Sawana et al. 2015

Synonyms
- Burkholderia umamae Caballero-Mellado et al. 2004

Species of bacterium

Paraburkholderia unamae is a species of bacteria.
