= Paraburkholderia phenazinia =

Scientific classification
- Domain: Bacteria
- Kingdom: Pseudomonadati
- Phylum: Pseudomonadota
- Class: Betaproteobacteria
- Order: Burkholderiales
- Family: Burkholderiaceae
- Genus: Paraburkholderia
- Species: P. phenazinia

Binomial name
- Paraburkholderia phenazinia (Bell and Turner 1973) Sawana et al. 2015

Type strain
- ATCC 33666; CCUG 46044; CFBP 4793; CIP 106502; DSM 10684; JCM 10564; LMG 2247; NCIB 11027; NCIMB 11027

Synonyms
- Pseudomonas phenazinia Bell and Turner 1973; Pseudomonas phenazinium Bell and Turner 1973; Paraburkholderia phenazinium (Bell and Turner 1973) Sawana et al. 2015; Burkholderia phenazinium (Bell and Turner 1973) Viallard et al. 1998; Burkholderia phenazinia (Bell and Turner 1973) Viallard et al. 1998

Species of bacterium

Paraburkholderia phenazinia is a Gram-negative soil bacterium.
