= Cupriavidus taiwanensis =

Scientific classification
- Domain: Bacteria
- Kingdom: Pseudomonadati
- Phylum: Pseudomonadota
- Class: Betaproteobacteria
- Order: Burkholderiales
- Family: Burkholderiaceae
- Genus: Cupriavidus
- Species: C. taiwanensis

Binomial name
- Cupriavidus taiwanensis Vandamme and Coenye 2004

Type strain
- BCRC 17206, CCRC 17206, CCUG 44338, Chen R1, CIP 107171, DSM 17343, LMG 19424, R-10603, Vandamme R-10603

Synonyms
- Ralstonia taiwanensis, Wautersia taiwanensis

Species of bacterium

Cupriavidus taiwanensis is a Gram-negative, nitrogen-fixing bacterium of the genus Cupriavidus and family Burkholderiaceae, which forms indeterminate nodules on Mimosa pudica. The genome of C. taiwanensis is completely sequenced.

== See also ==
- List of sequenced bacterial genomes
