= Paraburkholderia phenoliruptrix =

Scientific classification
- Domain: Bacteria
- Kingdom: Pseudomonadati
- Phylum: Pseudomonadota
- Class: Betaproteobacteria
- Order: Burkholderiales
- Family: Burkholderiaceae
- Genus: Paraburkholderia
- Species: P. phenoliruptrix

Binomial name
- Paraburkholderia phenoliruptrix (Coenye et al. 2005) Sawana et al. 2015

Type strain
- AC1100; CCUG 48558; DSM 17773; LMG 22037

Synonyms
- Burkholderia phenoliruptrix Coenye et al. 2005

Species of bacterium

Paraburkholderia phenoliruptrix is a species of bacteria.
