= Caballeronia schumannianae =

"Candidatus Caballeronia schumannianae"

Scientific classification (Candidatus)
- Domain: Bacteria
- Phylum: Pseudomonadota
- Class: Betaproteobacteria
- Order: Burkholderiales
- Family: Burkholderiaceae
- Genus: Caballeronia
- Species: "Ca. C. schumannianae"

Binomial name
- "Candidatus Caballeronia schumannianae"

Synonyms
- "Candidatus Burkholderia schumannianae" Lemaire et al. 2012

Species of bacterium

"Candidatus Burkholderia schumannianae" is a bacterium from the genus Caballeronia and the family Burkholderiaceae. "Candidatus Caballeronia schumannianae" is an endosymbiont.
