= Cupriavidus gilardii =

Scientific classification
- Domain: Bacteria
- Kingdom: Pseudomonadati
- Phylum: Pseudomonadota
- Class: Betaproteobacteria
- Order: Burkholderiales
- Family: Burkholderiaceae
- Genus: Cupriavidus
- Species: C. gilardii

Binomial name
- Cupriavidus gilardii Vandamme and Coenye 2004

Type strain
- API 121-2-84, API 141-2-84, ATCC 700815, BCRC 17471, CCM 4866, CCRC 17471, CCUG 38401, CFBP 6736, CIP 105966, DSM 17292, Gilardi 4325, JCM 11283, LMG 5886

Synonyms
- Wautersia gilardii; Ralstonia gilardii

Species of bacterium

Cupriavidus gilardii is a gram-negative, aerobic, motile, oxidase-positive bacterium from the genus Cupriavidus and the family Burkholderiaceae. The bacteria is motile by a single polar flagellum. It is named after G. L. Gilardi, an American microbiologist. The organism was identified initially as Ralstonia gilardii in 1999, then was renamed Wautersiella gilardii, and most recently was moved into the genus Cupriavidus after 16S rRNA gene sequencing revealed it to be most closely related to Cupriavidus necator.

Notably, species of this genus are not inhibited by copper due to the production of chelation factors, and in fact, may be stimulated by the presence of copper.

== Clinical significance ==
Cupriavidus gilardii may be resistant to multiple antibiotic agents that typically are an effective treatment against similar bacteria. The carbapenem-resistant C. gilardii bacteria has been found in stool surveillance cultures and has been associated with fatal human infection.

== Industrial accident ==
In February 2026, Cheyenne Board of Public Utilities (BOPU) discovered a novel bacterium in its water treatment system. Wyoming's Depart of Environmental Quality (DEQ) was immediately informed of this unknown, and thus, unregulated bacterium, for which there were not standard tests nor guidelines to be followed. Further testing revealed the bacteria to be Cupriavidus gilardii, a fact announced to the public on June 26, 2026, after extensive field work found the source of the contamination was traced to discharge from a then-unidentified industrial actor. The water discharge privileges of the industrial actor were immediately and permanently revoked.

The contamination of the utility required extensive remediation efforts to clean out the entire system because the bacterium had become established throughout the utility system. Irrigation was switched to potable water. The entire water reuse system was drained and disinfected. The extensive decontamination project took two months to complete.

In mid-July 2026, Wyoming officials revealed that the source of the contamination was the Meta Platforms (formerly Facebook) data center. The construction sub-contractor responsible was Goat Systems LLC. Flush-and-fill operations were the mechanical cause of the contaminated discharge. In this instance, drinking water was not under threat, because the water treated by the utility was solely for agricultural use.

The incident became a new factor in concerns about the environmental footprint of data centers.
