= Chitinimonas naiadis =

Scientific classification
- Domain: Bacteria
- Kingdom: Pseudomonadati
- Phylum: Pseudomonadota
- Class: Betaproteobacteria
- Order: Burkholderiales
- Family: Burkholderiaceae
- Genus: Chitinimonas
- Species: C. naiadis

Binomial name
- Chitinimonas naiadis Padakandla and Chae 2017

Type strain
- JCM 31504, KCTC 42755, strain AR2

Species of bacterium

Chitinimonas naiadis is a Gram-negative, aerobic, rod-shaped and motile bacterium from the genus Chitinimonas which has been isolated from water from the Yeongsan River in Korea.
