= Pandoraea oxalativorans =

Scientific classification
- Domain: Bacteria
- Kingdom: Pseudomonadati
- Phylum: Pseudomonadota
- Class: Betaproteobacteria
- Order: Burkholderiales
- Family: Burkholderiaceae
- Genus: Pandoraea
- Species: P. oxalativorans

Binomial name
- Pandoraea oxalativorans Sahin et al. 2011

Type strain
- CCM 7677, DSM 23570, NBRC 106091, TA25

Species of bacterium

Pandoraea oxalativorans is a Gram-negative, aerobic, non-spore-forming bacterium from the genus Pandoraea.
