= Paraburkholderia susongensis =

Scientific classification
- Domain: Bacteria
- Kingdom: Pseudomonadati
- Phylum: Pseudomonadota
- Class: Betaproteobacteria
- Order: Burkholderiales
- Family: Burkholderiaceae
- Genus: Paraburkholderia
- Species: P. susongensis

Binomial name
- Paraburkholderia susongensis (Gu et al. 2015) Dobritsa and Samadpour 2016

Type strain
- CCTCC AB 2014142; DSM 100877; JCM 30231; L226

Synonyms
- Burkholderia susongensis Gu et al. 2015

Species of bacterium

Paraburkholderia susongensis is a Gram-negative bacterium from the genus Paraburkholderia which has been isolated from a weathered rock surface in Susong in the Anhui Province in China.
