= Cupriavidus pampae =

Scientific classification
- Domain: Bacteria
- Kingdom: Pseudomonadati
- Phylum: Pseudomonadota
- Class: Betaproteobacteria
- Order: Burkholderiales
- Family: Burkholderiaceae
- Genus: Cupriavidus
- Species: C. pampae

Binomial name
- Cupriavidus pampae Cuadrado et al. 2010

Type strain
- ATCC BAA-699, CCUG 49340, CIP 106792, DSM 11853, LMG 18990, LMG 19474

Species of bacterium

Cupriavidus pampae is a Gram-negative, oxidase- and catalase-positive, aerobic, non-spore-forming, motile bacterium of the genus Cupriavidus and family Burkholderiaceae, which was isolated from the agricultural soil of the humid pampa region in Argentina.
