= Paraburkholderia terrae =

Scientific classification
- Domain: Bacteria
- Kingdom: Pseudomonadati
- Phylum: Pseudomonadota
- Class: Betaproteobacteria
- Order: Burkholderiales
- Family: Burkholderiaceae
- Genus: Paraburkholderia
- Species: P. terrae

Binomial name
- Paraburkholderia terrae (Yang et al. 2006) Sawana et al. 2015

Type strain
- CIP 109196^{T} DSM 17804^{T} KCTC 12388^{T} KMY02^{T} Lee KMY02^{T} LMG 23368^{T} NBRC 100964^{T}

Synonyms
- Burkholderia terrae Yang et al. 2006

Species of bacterium

Paraburkholderia terrae is a Gram-negative, nitrogen-fixing, catalase and oxidase-positive, motile bacterium with a single polar flagellum, from the genus Paraburkholderia and family Burkholderiaceae, which was isolated from a forest soil in Daejeon in South Korea.
