= Paraburkholderia megapolitana =

Scientific classification
- Domain: Bacteria
- Kingdom: Pseudomonadati
- Phylum: Pseudomonadota
- Class: Betaproteobacteria
- Order: Burkholderiales
- Family: Burkholderiaceae
- Genus: Paraburkholderia
- Species: P. megapolitana

Binomial name
- Paraburkholderia megapolitana (Vandamme et al. 2007) Sawana et al. 2015

Type strain
- A3; CCUG 53006; DSM 23488; LMG 23650

Synonyms
- Burkholderia megapolitana Vandamme et al. 2007

Species of bacterium

Paraburkholderia megapolitana is a gram-negative, catalase and oxidase-negative aerobic, non-spore-forming, bacterium from the genus Paraburkholderia and the family Burkholderiaceae which was isolated from moss of nutrient-poor plant communities from the southern coast of the Baltic Sea in Germany.
