= Caballeronia virens =

"Candidatus Caballeronia virens"

Scientific classification (Candidatus)
- Domain: Bacteria
- Phylum: Pseudomonadota
- Class: Betaproteobacteria
- Order: Burkholderiales
- Family: Burkholderiaceae
- Genus: Caballeronia
- Species: "Ca. B. virens"

Binomial name
- "Candidatus Caballeronia virens"

Synonyms
- "Candidatus Burkholderia virens" Lemaire et al. 2011

Species of bacterium

"Candidatus Caballeronia virens" is a bacterium from the genus Caballeronia and the family Burkholderiaceae.
