= Paraburkholderia rhizosphaerae =

Scientific classification
- Domain: Bacteria
- Kingdom: Pseudomonadati
- Phylum: Pseudomonadota
- Class: Betaproteobacteria
- Order: Burkholderiales
- Family: Burkholderiaceae
- Genus: Paraburkholderia
- Species: P. rhizosphaerae

Binomial name
- Paraburkholderia rhizosphaerae (Lee and Whang 2015) Dobritsa and Samadpour 2016

Type strain
- KACC 17603; NBRC 109935; NCAIM B.02541; WR 43

Synonyms
- Burkholderia rhizosphaerae Lee and Whang 2015

Species of bacterium

Paraburkholderia rhizosphaerae is a bacterium from the genus of Paraburkholderia which has been isolated from rhizosphere soil in Daejeon in Korea.
