= Caballeronia choica =

Scientific classification
- Domain: Bacteria
- Kingdom: Pseudomonadati
- Phylum: Pseudomonadota
- Class: Betaproteobacteria
- Order: Burkholderiales
- Family: Burkholderiaceae
- Genus: Caballeronia
- Species: C. choica

Binomial name
- Caballeronia choica (Vandamme et al. 2013) Dobritsa and Samadpour 2016

Type strain
- LMG 22940^{T} LMG 27137^{T} CCUG 63063^{T} LMG 22940^{T} RA1-8^{T}

Synonyms
- Burkholderia choica Vandamme et al. 2013; Paraburkholderia choica Sawana et al. 2014

Species of bacterium

Caballeronia choica is a bacterium from the genus Caballeronia.
