= Paraburkholderia bryophila =

Scientific classification
- Domain: Bacteria
- Kingdom: Pseudomonadati
- Phylum: Pseudomonadota
- Class: Betaproteobacteria
- Order: Burkholderiales
- Family: Burkholderiaceae
- Genus: Paraburkholderia
- Species: P. bryophila

Binomial name
- Paraburkholderia bryophila (Vandamme et al. 2007) Sawana et al. 2015

Type strain
- 1S18; CCUG 52993; DSM 23487; LMG 23644

Synonyms
- Burkholderia bryophila Vandamme et al. 2007

Species of bacterium

Paraburkholderia bryophila is a Gram-negative, catalase- and oxidase-positive, non-spore-forming, and nonmotile bacterium of the genus Paraburkholderia and the family Burkholderiaceae. Research has shown that P. bryophila demonstrates anti-fungal activity against phytopathogens and the growth of plant-associated properties.
