= Caballeronia telluris =

Scientific classification
- Domain: Bacteria
- Kingdom: Pseudomonadati
- Phylum: Pseudomonadota
- Class: Betaproteobacteria
- Order: Burkholderiales
- Family: Burkholderiaceae
- Genus: Caballeronia
- Species: C. telluris

Binomial name
- Caballeronia telluris (Vandamme et al. 2013) Dobritsa and Samadpour 2016

Synonyms
- Burkholderia telluris Vandamme et al. 2013

Species of bacterium

Caballeronia telluris is a bacterium from the genus Caballeronia and the family Burkholderiaceae.
