= Paraburkholderia acidipaludis =

Scientific classification
- Domain: Bacteria
- Kingdom: Pseudomonadati
- Phylum: Pseudomonadota
- Class: Betaproteobacteria
- Order: Burkholderiales
- Family: Burkholderiaceae
- Genus: Paraburkholderia
- Species: P. acidipaludis

Binomial name
- Paraburkholderia acidipaludis (Aizawa et al. 2010) Sawana et al. 2015

Type strain
- BCRC 80192; NBRC 101816; SA33; VTCC D6-6

Synonyms
- Burkholderia acidipaludis Aizawa et al. 2010

Species of bacterium

Paraburkholderia acidipaludis is a Gram-negative, catalase- and oxidase-positive, aerobic, aluminium-tolerant, non-spore-forming, nonmotile bacterium of the genus Paraburkholderia and the family Burkholderiaceae, which was isolated from the Chinese water chestnut (Eleocharis dulcis) in Vietnam and Thailand. Colonies of Paraburkholderia acidipaludis are pale yellow.
