= Paraburkholderia monticola =

Scientific classification
- Domain: Bacteria
- Kingdom: Pseudomonadati
- Phylum: Pseudomonadota
- Class: Betaproteobacteria
- Order: Burkholderiales
- Family: Burkholderiaceae
- Genus: Paraburkholderia
- Species: P. monticola

Binomial name
- Paraburkholderia monticola (Baek et al. 2015) Dobritsa and Samadpour 2016

Type strain
- DSM 100849; JC2948; JCM 19904; KACC 17924

Synonyms
- Burkholderia monticola Baek et al. 2015

Species of bacterium

Paraburkholderia monticola is a Gram-negative, short-rod-shaped and aerobic bacterium from the genus Paraburkholderia which has been isolated from soil from the Gwanak Mountain in Korea.
