= Paraburkholderia mimosarum =

Scientific classification
- Domain: Bacteria
- Kingdom: Pseudomonadati
- Phylum: Pseudomonadota
- Class: Betaproteobacteria
- Order: Burkholderiales
- Family: Burkholderiaceae
- Genus: Paraburkholderia
- Species: P. mimosarum

Binomial name
- Paraburkholderia mimosarum (Vandamme et al. 2007) Sawana et al. 2015

Type strain
- BCRC 17516; DSM 21841; LMG 23256; PAS44

Synonyms
- Burkholderia mimosarum Vandamme et al. 2007

Species of bacterium

Paraburkholderia mimosarum is a gram-negative, catalase and oxidase-positive non-spore-forming, rod-shaped bacterium from the genus Paraburkholderia and the family Burkholderiaceae. P. mimosarum is able to nodulate tropical plant species, mainly from the genus Mimosa.
