= Caballeronia sordidicola =

Scientific classification
- Domain: Bacteria
- Kingdom: Pseudomonadati
- Phylum: Pseudomonadota
- Class: Betaproteobacteria
- Order: Burkholderiales
- Family: Burkholderiaceae
- Genus: Caballeronia
- Species: C. sordidicola

Binomial name
- Caballeronia sordidicola (Lim et al. 2003) Dobritsa and Samadpour 2016

Synonyms
- Burkholderia sordidicola Lim et al. 2003

Species of bacterium

Caballeronia sordidicola is a species of bacteria which has been reported to perform biological nitrogen fixation and promote plant growth.
