= Limnobacter thiooxidans =

Scientific classification
- Domain: Bacteria
- Kingdom: Pseudomonadati
- Phylum: Pseudomonadota
- Class: Betaproteobacteria
- Order: Burkholderiales
- Family: Burkholderiaceae
- Genus: Limnobacter
- Species: L. thiooxidans

Binomial name
- Limnobacter thiooxidans Spring et al. 2001

Type strain
- CIP 107302, CS-K2, DSM 13612, KCTC 12942, LMG 19593, Spring CS-K2

Species of bacterium

Limnobacter thiooxidans is a Gram-negative, thiosulfate-oxidizing bacterium with a single polar flagellum, from the genus Limnobacter and family Burkholderiaceae, isolated from sediment of the littoral zone from the Chiemsee in Germany.
