= Cupriavidus nantongensis =

Scientific classification
- Domain: Bacteria
- Kingdom: Pseudomonadati
- Phylum: Pseudomonadota
- Class: Betaproteobacteria
- Order: Burkholderiales
- Family: Burkholderiaceae
- Genus: Cupriavidus
- Species: C. nantongensis

Binomial name
- Cupriavidus nantongensis Sun et al. 2016

Type strain
- KCTC 42909, LMG 29218, strain X1

Species of bacterium

Cupriavidus nantongensis is a Gram-negative, chlorpyrifos-degrading and aerobic bacterium from the genus of Cupriavidus which has been isolated from sludge from Nantong, China.
