= Paraburkholderia xenovorans =

Scientific classification
- Domain: Bacteria
- Kingdom: Pseudomonadati
- Phylum: Pseudomonadota
- Class: Betaproteobacteria
- Order: Burkholderiales
- Family: Burkholderiaceae
- Genus: Paraburkholderia
- Species: P. xenovorans

Binomial name
- Paraburkholderia xenovorans (Goris et al. 2004) Sawana et al. 2015

Synonyms
- Burkholderia xenovorans Goris et al. 2004

Species of bacterium

Paraburkholderia xenovorans is a species of bacteria.

== Genomics ==
The genome of Paraburkholderia xenovorans (LB400) is one of the largest bacterial genomes completely sequenced to date. The sequenced strain LB400 has a 9.73-Mbp genome divided between two chromosomes and a megaplasmid, and it possesses over 30 aromatic-compound catabolic pathways, including 11 central and more than 20 peripheral pathways. The recent genomic studies of this organism have helped expand understanding of bacterial catabolism, noncatabolic physiological adaptation to organic compounds, and the evolution of large bacterial genomes. The metabolic pathways from phylogenetically diverse isolates are very similar with respect to overall organization. As originally noted in pseudomonads, a large number of "peripheral aromatic" pathways funnel a range of natural and xenobiotic compounds into a restricted number of "central aromatic" pathways. These pathways are genetically organized in genus-specific fashions. Comparative genomic studies reveal that some pathways are more widespread than initially thought. Functional genomic studies have established that even organisms harboring high numbers of homologous enzymes seem to contain few examples of true redundancy. Analyses have indicated that recent genetic flux appears to have played a more significant role in the evolution of some large genomes, such as Burkholderia xenovorans LB400, than in others. However, the emerging trend is that the large gene repertoires of potent pollutant degraders such as B. xenovorans LB400 have evolved principally through more ancient processes. That this is true in such phylogenetically diverse species is remarkable and further suggests the ancient origin of this catabolic capacity. Aromatic compounds are among the most recalcitrant of organic pollutants and much interest is seen in using microbial biodegradation to clean up contaminated sites.
