= Paraburkholderia sacchari =

Scientific classification
- Domain: Bacteria
- Kingdom: Pseudomonadati
- Phylum: Pseudomonadota
- Class: Betaproteobacteria
- Order: Burkholderiales
- Family: Burkholderiaceae
- Genus: Paraburkholderia
- Species: P. sacchari

Binomial name
- Paraburkholderia sacchari (Brämer et al. 2001) Sawana et al. 2015

Type strain
- CCT 6771; CCUG 46043; CIP 107211; DSM 17165; IPT 101; LMG 19450

Synonyms
- Burkholderia sacchari Brämer et al. 2001

Species of bacterium

Paraburkholderia sacchari is a species of bacteria in the phylum Pseudomonadota. It was isolated in the 1990s from sugarcane crop soil (São Paulo state, Brazil), and later identified as a new bacterial species, originally named as Burkholderia sacchari. Paraburkholderia sacchari was found to be capable of creating and accumulating polyhydroxyalkanoates (PHA) by incorporating different monomers. This strain was subject of a number of genetic and bioproccess engineering studies conducted worldwide aiming to establish PHA production from different substrates, especially using agro-industrial byproducts.
