= Caballeronia zhejiangensis =

Scientific classification
- Domain: Bacteria
- Kingdom: Pseudomonadati
- Phylum: Pseudomonadota
- Class: Betaproteobacteria
- Order: Burkholderiales
- Family: Burkholderiaceae
- Genus: Caballeronia
- Species: C. zhejiangensis

Binomial name
- Caballeronia zhejiangensis (Lu et al. 2012) Dobritsa and Samadpour 2016

Type strain
- CCTCC AB 2010354^{T} KCTC 23300^{T} LMG 27258^{T} OP-1^{T}

Synonyms
- Burkholderia zhejiangensis Lu et al. 2012

Species of bacterium

Caballeronia zhejiangensis is a Gram-negative, non-spore-forming, rod-shaped bacterium from the genus Caballeronia, which was isolated from a wastewater treatment system in China. Caballeronia zhejiangensis has the ability to degrade methyl parathion.
