= Chitinimonas lacunae =

Scientific classification
- Domain: Bacteria
- Kingdom: Pseudomonadati
- Phylum: Pseudomonadota
- Class: Betaproteobacteria
- Order: Burkholderiales
- Family: Burkholderiaceae
- Genus: Chitinimonas
- Species: C. lacunae

Binomial name
- Chitinimonas lacunae Yang et al. 2017

Type strain
- KCTC 52574, LMG 29894, strain H2

Synonyms
- Chitinimonas busanensis

Species of bacterium

Chitinimonas lacunae is a Gram-negative and rod-shaped bacterium from the genus Chitinimonas which has been isolated from an artificial pond in Korea.
