= Caballeronia kirkii =

Candidatus Caballeronia kirkii

Scientific classification (Candidatus)
- Domain: Bacteria
- Phylum: Pseudomonadota
- Class: Betaproteobacteria
- Order: Burkholderiales
- Family: Burkholderiaceae
- Genus: Caballeronia
- Species: Ca. C. kirkii

Binomial name
- Candidatus Caballeronia kirkii

Synonyms
- Candidatus Burkholderia kirkii Van Oevelen et al. 2002

Species of bacterium

Candidatus Caballeronia kirkii is a Gram-negative, non-fermenting bacterium from the genus Caballeronia and the family Burkholderiaceae. Ca. C. kirkii is an endosymbiont of the plant Psychotria kirkii, also known as Rubiaceae, and exists inside leaf and stem nodules.

== Discovery ==
Ca. C. kirkii was cultivated, classified as an endophyte, and placed under the Betaproteobacteria subclass in 2002. The microsymbiont was discovered in pockets or galls on the leaves of Rubiaceae plants and classified as a novel species of the genus Burkholderia.

== Symbiotic life cycle ==
Ca. C. kirkii are known to have a symbiotic relationship with Psychotria kirkii, so that the bacteria are transferred from one plant generation to the next through the seeds. The bacteria also reside in the stem apical region, on a permanent basis, where it can infect every new developing leaf and every ovary, and therefore, seeds. The bacteria are therefore in a continuous symbiotic relationship with the plant throughout its entire life cycle.

The major role that it plays in the Rubiaceae life cycle is related to the growth of the plant. In the absence of the nodules containing these bacteria, the plant is unable to undergo normal cell division and cellular differentiation, which results in morphological malfunctions, stunting growth and eventually causing death.
