= Paraburkholderia kururiensis =

Scientific classification
- Domain: Bacteria
- Kingdom: Pseudomonadati
- Phylum: Pseudomonadota
- Class: Betaproteobacteria
- Order: Burkholderiales
- Family: Burkholderiaceae
- Genus: Paraburkholderia
- Species: P. kururiensis

Binomial name
- Paraburkholderia kururiensis (Zhang et al. 2000) Sawana et al. 2015

Type strain
- ATCC 700977; CCUG 43663; CIP 106643; DSM 13646; JCM 10599; KP23; LMG 19447

Synonyms
- Burkholderia kururiensis Zhang et al. 2000

Species of bacterium

Paraburkholderia kururiensis is a species of bacteria.

It was isolated by Zhang et al. from a groundwater sample in Japan. The sample was heavily contaminated with the industrial solvent trichloroethylene (TCE), which Paraburkholderia kururiensis degraded.

== Phenotypic characteristics ==
Phenotypically, P. kururiensis is a Gram negative bacterium with an oval cell morphology. It was found to metabolise simple sugars such as mannose, glucose, galactose and maltose, as well as alcohols such as glycerol, inositol and mannitol.

== Genotypic characteristics ==
Genotypically, studies of 16s ribosomal RNA suggested P. kururiensis belonged to the genus Paraburkholderia. The G+C total DNA content was measured as 64.8 mol %, as perhaps would be expected for Pseudomonadota.

== Type strain ==
Based on information gathered during phenotypic and genotypic analysis, the KP23^{T} strain isolated by Zhang et al. was reckoned to be a new species in the genus, and the name Burkholderia kururiensis was proposed. The type strain is KP23^{T} (= JCM 10599). It has since been transferred to the genus Paraburkholderia.
