= Paraburkholderia terricola =

Scientific classification
- Domain: Bacteria
- Kingdom: Pseudomonadati
- Phylum: Pseudomonadota
- Class: Betaproteobacteria
- Order: Burkholderiales
- Family: Burkholderiaceae
- Genus: Paraburkholderia
- Species: P. terricola

Binomial name
- Paraburkholderia terricola (Goris et al. 2003) Sawana et al. 2015

Synonyms
- Burkholderia terricola Goris et al. 2003

Species of bacterium

Paraburkholderia terricola is a species of bacteria in the phylum Pseudomonadota.
