= Caballeronia udeis =

Scientific classification
- Domain: Bacteria
- Kingdom: Pseudomonadati
- Phylum: Pseudomonadota
- Class: Betaproteobacteria
- Order: Burkholderiales
- Family: Burkholderiaceae
- Genus: Caballeronia
- Species: C. udeis

Binomial name
- Caballeronia udeis (Vandamme et al. 2013) Dobritsa and Samadpour 2016

Type strain
- CCUG 63061^{T} Hg 2^{T} LMG 27134^{T} R-20940^{T}

Synonyms
- Burkholderia udeis Vandamme et al. 2013

Species of bacterium

Caballeronia udeis is a bacterium from the genus Caballeronia and family Burkholderiaceae which has been reported to perform biological nitrogen fixation and promote plant growth.
