= Lautropia mirabilis =

Scientific classification
- Domain: Bacteria
- Kingdom: Pseudomonadati
- Phylum: Pseudomonadota
- Class: Betaproteobacteria
- Order: Burkholderiales
- Family: Burkholderiaceae
- Genus: Lautropia
- Species: L. mirabilis

Binomial name
- Lautropia mirabilis Gerner-Smidt et al. 1995

Type strain
- AB2188, ATCC 51599, CCM 4470, CCUG 34794, CIP 106317, DSM 11362, NCTC 12852

Species of bacterium

Lautropia mirabilis is a Gram-negative, facultatively anaerobic, oxidase- and catalase-positive, motile bacterium of the genus Lautropia and family Burkholderiaceae, isolated from the mouth of children who were infected with human immunodeficiency virus (HIV).

== Description and significance ==
Lautropia mirabilis is a Gram-negative, polymorphic, motile, coccoid bacteria that is most commonly found in the human oral cavity and the upper respiratory tract. It was first isolated in 1930 and it was identified as Sarcina mirabilis. However, its status as a unique species was not proposed until 1994, when it was rediscovered in samples from the gingival margins of healthy human patients. Its status as a new species was validated in 1995 by the International Journal of Systematic and Evolutionary Microbiology.

L. mirabilis can be grown on all non-selective media except for egg yolk agar. Furthermore, when L. mirabilis is inoculated onto selective media, no growth can be observed. When grown in a broth culture, granules are typically observed loosely adhering to the side of the tube. The species is a mesophile, with optimum growth restricted between 30 and 44 °C. As a facultative anaerobe, L. mirabilis is capable of growing in both aerobic and anaerobic conditions; however it grows best under aerobic conditions.

Three colony morphologies can be observed when the bacteria is cultured on solid media. Younger colonies tend to form a flat and dry, circular morphology. After one day however, the predominant form is a larger and more wrinkled morphology. The third colony type is smooth, shiny and round with mucoid surrounding it.

Under a light microscope, three cellular morphologies can be observed from L mirabilis. The first, a capsulated cocci approximately 1 to 2 μm in diameter, is the most common morphology, independent of the age of the culture. The second is a motile cocci that is also 1 to 2 μm in diameter. It is typically found on the edge of a colony after one day of culture. Between three and nine flagella project out from the cell wall in a lophotrichous fashion. Finally, the third morphology is similar to a sphaeroblast. It is 5 to 10 μm in diameter, and it is typically found in older cultures.

L. mirabilis has been isolated from the cavities of children infected with human immunodeficiency virus and the sputum of cystic fibrosis patients. Despite these findings, numerous studies have also found that the bacterium is more commonly found in healthier patients when compared to patients with periodontitis. These studies suggest L. mirabilis plays a role in multiple human diseases; however, further research is required to understand the functional and mechanistic role of this microorganism in these diseases.

== Genome structure ==
The linear DNA genome of Lautropia mirabilis type strain ATCC 51599 is completely sequenced. There is only one chromosome which has a length of approximately 3.15 Mb, and no plasmids have been discovered. This genome size is small compared to other species in the same order, like Burkholderiales, which may account for its symbiont relationship with humans. The genome has a total of 2,498 protein-coding genes and the GC content accounts for 65.5%. 41 tRNAs and 51 pseudo genes were identified.

== Cell structure and metabolism ==
As a Gram-negative bacteria, the thin peptidoglycan layer sandwiched by three layers on either side can be observed with an electron microscope. Moreover, the majority of the bacteria within an established colony have a membranous layer that exists between cells. Many fine, electron-dense granules can typically be observed in the bacteria.

L. mirabilis is normally isolated from human dental plaque. Within these plaques, the bacteria typically lives with a variety of other bacteria in a supragingival or subgingival biofilm. Although the numbers for Gram-negative bacteria begin to dominate with the development of gingivitis, L. mirabilis numbers decrease.

L. mirabilis displays a pleomorphic nature that includes morphologies with and without flagellum. The bacteria is shown to include between three and nine flagella projecting from a single point of the cell wall. This morphology is consistent with bacteria with lophotrichous flagella which uses it for motile transport. No research has been done to elucidate the utility of the flagella or lack thereof.

L. mirabilis is a facultative anaerobe. It is capable of fermenting glucose, fructose, sucrose and mannitol. The bacteria grows best under aerobic conditions; however, no research on aerobic-specific respiration pathways has been done. The bacteria is positive for oxidase, catalase and urease. Additionally, it is capable of reducing nitrate and nitrite.

== Ecology ==
The habitat of L. mirabilis is the gingival margins of the human oral cavity. As a facultative anaerobe, it is capable of living in any location of a biofilm. The microbe appears to be exclusive to the human oral microbiome. The relationship is potentially symbiotic due to its presence in dental plaque as well as its significant presence in typically healthy patients.

== Pathology ==
The presence of L. mirabilis has been linked to HIV-positive children as well as the sputum of one cystic fibrosis patient. The use of antibiotics has shown to effectively reduce the growth of the bacteria inside the oral cavity.

== Application to biotechnology ==
There are currently no biotechnological applications for this microorganisms. The organism is known to actively produce polysaccharide when inoculated on sucrose sugar agar plates.

== Current research ==
There has been little recent research focused on L. mirabilis. There have been, however, a number of studies that identified the bacteria in healthy patients without periodontitis and gingivitis.
