= Caballeronia verschuerenii =

"Candidatus Caballeronia verschuerenii"

Scientific classification (Candidatus)
- Domain: Bacteria
- Phylum: Pseudomonadota
- Class: Betaproteobacteria
- Order: Burkholderiales
- Family: Burkholderiaceae
- Genus: Caballeronia
- Species: "Ca. C. verschuerenii"

Binomial name
- "Candidatus Caballeronia verschuerenii"

Synonyms
- "Candidatus Burkholderia verschuerenii"

Species of bacterium

"Candidatus Caballeronia verschuerenii" is a bacterium from the genus of Caballeronia and the family Burkholderiaceae.

"Candidatus Caballeronia verschuerenii" is an endosymbiont of the plant Psychotria verschuerenii
