= Cupriavidus alkaliphilus =

Scientific classification
- Domain: Bacteria
- Kingdom: Pseudomonadati
- Phylum: Pseudomonadota
- Class: Betaproteobacteria
- Order: Burkholderiales
- Family: Burkholderiaceae
- Genus: Cupriavidus
- Species: C. alkaliphilus

Binomial name
- Cupriavidus alkaliphilus Estrada-de Los Santos et al. 2012

Type strain
- ASC-732, CIP 110330, LMG 26294, strain ASC-732

Species of bacterium

Cupriavidus alkaliphilus is a bacterium of the genus Cupriavidus and the family Burkholderiaceae which was isolated from the rhizosphere of agricultural plants which grow on alkaline soils in northeast Mexico.
