= Pandoraea thiooxydans =

Scientific classification
- Domain: Bacteria
- Kingdom: Pseudomonadati
- Phylum: Pseudomonadota
- Class: Betaproteobacteria
- Order: Burkholderiales
- Family: Burkholderiaceae
- Genus: Pandoraea
- Species: P. thiooxydans

Binomial name
- Pandoraea thiooxydans Anandham et al. 2010

Type strain
- ATSB16, KACC 12757, LMG 24674, LMG 24779

Species of bacterium

Pandoraea thiooxydans is a Gram-negative, oxidase-positive, catalase-negative, aerobic, thiosulfate-oxidizing, rod-shaped, motile bacterium with a single polar flagellum, from the genus Pandoraea, isolated from rhizosphere soils of sesame in Junghwa-dong in the Republic of Korea.
