= Lautropia =

Scientific classification
- Domain: Bacteria
- Kingdom: Pseudomonadati
- Phylum: Pseudomonadota
- Class: Betaproteobacteria
- Order: Burkholderiales
- Family: Burkholderiaceae
- Genus: Lautropia; Gerner-Smidt et al. 1995

Type species
- Lautropia mirabilis

Species
- Lautropia mirabilis

Genus of bacteria

Lautropia is a genus of bacteria of the family Burkholderiaceae in the class Betaproteobacteria. Only one species, Lautropia mirabilis, has been described.
