= Paraburkholderia ginsengisoli =

Scientific classification
- Domain: Bacteria
- Kingdom: Pseudomonadati
- Phylum: Pseudomonadota
- Class: Betaproteobacteria
- Order: Burkholderiales
- Family: Burkholderiaceae
- Genus: Paraburkholderia
- Species: P. ginsengisoli

Binomial name
- Paraburkholderia ginsengisoli (Kim et al. 2006) Sawana et al. 2015

Type strain
- DSM 21638; DSM 29465; KCTC 12389; KMY03; NBRC 100965

Synonyms
- Burkholderia ginsengisoli Kim et al. 2006

Species of bacterium

Paraburkholderia ginsengisoli is a gram-negative, rod-shaped, motile bacterium with unipolar polytrichous flagella from the genus Paraburkholderia and the family Burkholderiaceae which was isolated from soil of a ginseng field in South Korea. Paraburkholderia ginsengisoli has the ability to produce β-glucosidase.
