= Caballeronia =

Scientific classification
- Domain: Bacteria
- Kingdom: Pseudomonadati
- Phylum: Pseudomonadota
- Class: Betaproteobacteria
- Order: Burkholderiales
- Family: Burkholderiaceae
- Genus: Caballeronia; Dobritsa and Samadpour 2016

Type species
- Caballeronia glathei

Species
- See text.

Genus of Betaproteobacteria

Caballeronia is a genus of bacteria from the family of Burkholderiaceae which has been reported to perform biological nitrogen fixation and promote plant growth.

== Species ==
Caballeronia comprises the following species:

- Caballeronia arationis
- Caballeronia arvi
- Candidatus Caballeronia brachyanthoides
- Caballeronia calidae
- Candidatus Caballeronia calva
- Caballeronia catudaia
- Caballeronia choica
- Caballeronia concitans
- Caballeronia cordobensis
- Candidatus Caballeronia crenata
- Caballeronia fortuita
- Caballeronia glathei
- Caballeronia glebae
- Caballeronia grimmiae
- Candidatus Caballeronia hispidae
- Caballeronia humi
- Candidatus Caballeronia humilis
- Caballeronia hypogeia
- Caballeronia jiangsuensis
- Candidatus Caballeronia kirkii
- Candidatus Caballeronia mamillata
- Caballeronia megalochromosomata
- Caballeronia mineralivorans
- Candidatus Caballeronia nigropunctata
- Caballeronia pedi
- Caballeronia peredens
- Caballeronia ptereochthonis
- Candidatus Caballeronia rigidae
- Candidatus Caballeronia schumannianae
- Caballeronia sordidicola
- Caballeronia telluris
- Caballeronia temeraria
- Caballeronia terrestris
- Caballeronia turbans
- Caballeronia udeis
- Candidatus Caballeronia verschuerenii
- Candidatus Caballeronia virens
- Caballeronia zhejiangensis
