= Paraburkholderia =

Scientific classification
- Domain: Bacteria
- Kingdom: Pseudomonadati
- Phylum: Pseudomonadota
- Class: Betaproteobacteria
- Order: Burkholderiales
- Family: Burkholderiaceae
- Genus: Paraburkholderia; Sawana et al. 2014

Type species
- Burkholderia graminis Viallard et al. 1998

Genus of bacteria

Paraburkholderia is a genus of Pseudomonadota that are gram negative, slightly curved rods that are motile by means of flagella. Paraburkholderia members are usually environmental bacteria, including some that can associate with plants or form root nodules, and unlike Burkholderia species are not commonly associated with human infection. Paraburkholderia members form a monophyletic clade within the Burkholderiaceae family, which is what prompted their distinction as a genus independent from Burkholderia species, in combination with the finding of robust conserved signature indels which are unique to Paraburkholderia species, and are lacking in members of the genus Burkholderia. These CSIs distinguish the genus from all other bacteria. Additionally, the CSIs that were found to be shared by Burkholderia species are absent in Paraburkholderia, providing evidence of separate lineages.

Conserved signature indels have also been found within the genus Paraburkholderia. These CSIs are in parallel with phylogenomic analyses that indicate to two monophyletic clades within the genus; one clade harbours unnamed and Candidatus Paraburkholderia, while the other clade is inclusive of environmental Paraburkholderia, commonly used for agricultural purposes. CSIs have been found exclusive to each of these clades, and have not been found specific for any other combination of Paraburkholderia species, providing an additional level of phylogenetic resolution within the genus level. They have been reported to colonize endophytic tissues of many plants, including the hybrid spruce (Picea glauca x engelmannii) and lodgepole pine with a strong potential to perform biological nitrogen fixation and plant growth promotion.

== Species ==
Paraburkholderia comprises the following species:

- Paraburkholderia atlantica
- Paraburkholderia acidipaludis
- Paraburkholderia agricolaris
- Paraburkholderia aromaticivorans
- Paraburkholderia aspalathi
- Paraburkholderia azotifigens
- Paraburkholderia bannensis
- Paraburkholderia bonniea
- Paraburkholderia bryophila
- Paraburkholderia caballeronis
- Paraburkholderia caffeinilytica
- Paraburkholderia caledonica
- Paraburkholderia caribensis
- Paraburkholderia denitrificans
- Paraburkholderia diazotrophica
- Paraburkholderia dilworthii
- Paraburkholderia dipogonis
- Paraburkholderia eburnea
- Paraburkholderia elongata
- Paraburkholderia ferrariae
- Paraburkholderia franconis
- Paraburkholderia fungorum
- Paraburkholderia ginsengisoli
- Paraburkholderia ginsengiterrae
- Paraburkholderia graminis
- Paraburkholderia guartelaensis
- Paraburkholderia hayleyella
- Paraburkholderia heleia
- Paraburkholderia hiiakae
- Paraburkholderia hospita
- Paraburkholderia humisilvae
- Paraburkholderia jirisanensis
- Paraburkholderia kirstenboschensis
- Paraburkholderia insulsa
- Paraburkholderia kururiensis
- Paraburkholderia madseniana
- Paraburkholderia megapolitana
- Paraburkholderia metalliresistens
- Paraburkholderia metrosideri
- Paraburkholderia mimosarum
- Paraburkholderia monticola
- Paraburkholderia nodosa
- Paraburkholderia oxyphila
- Paraburkholderia pallidirosea
- Paraburkholderia paradisi
- Paraburkholderia peleae
- Paraburkholderia phenazinium
- Paraburkholderia phenoliruptrix
- Paraburkholderia phymatum
- Paraburkholderia phytofirmans
- Paraburkholderia piptadeniae
- Paraburkholderia rhizosphaerae
- Paraburkholderia rhynchosiae
- Paraburkholderia ribeironis
- Paraburkholderia sabiae
- Paraburkholderia sacchari
- Paraburkholderia sartisoli
- Paraburkholderia sediminicola
- Paraburkholderia silvatlantica
- Paraburkholderia solisilvae
- Paraburkholderia solitsugae
- Paraburkholderia sprentiae
- Paraburkholderia steynii
- Paraburkholderia strydomiana
- Paraburkholderia susongensis
- Paraburkholderia terrae
- Paraburkholderia terricola
- Paraburkholderia tropica
- Paraburkholderia tuberum
- Paraburkholderia unamae
- Paraburkholderia xenovorans
- Paraburkholderia youngii
