= Cupriavidus basilensis =

Scientific classification
- Domain: Bacteria
- Kingdom: Pseudomonadati
- Phylum: Pseudomonadota
- Class: Betaproteobacteria
- Order: Burkholderiales
- Family: Burkholderiaceae
- Genus: Cupriavidus
- Species: C. basilensis

Binomial name
- Cupriavidus basilensis Vandamme and Coenye 2004

Type strain
- ATCC BAA-699, CCUG 49340, CIP 106792, DSM 11853, LMG 18990, LMG 19474, RK1, Steinle RK1

Synonyms
- Ralstonia basilensis, Wautersia basilensis

Species of bacterium

Cupriavidus basilensis is a gram-negative soil bacterium of the genus Cupriavidus and the family Burkholderiaceae. The complete genome sequence of its type strain has been determined and is publicly available at DNA Data Bank of Japan, European Nucleotide Archive and GenBank, under the accession numbers CP062803, CP062804, CP062805, CP062806, CP062807, CP062808, CP062809 and CP062810.

C. basilensis has the ability to ferment 5-hydroxy-2-methylfurfural.
