= Limnobacter =

Scientific classification
- Domain: Bacteria
- Kingdom: Pseudomonadati
- Phylum: Pseudomonadota
- Class: Betaproteobacteria
- Order: Burkholderiales
- Family: Burkholderiaceae
- Genus: Limnobacter; Spring et al. 2001

Type species
- Limnobacter thiooxidans

Species
- Limnobacter litoralis Limnobacter thiooxidans

Genus of bacteria

Limnobacter is a genus of Gram-negative, non-spore-forming, aerobic, oxidase- and catalase-positive, motile bacteria with a single polar flagellum, of the family Burkholderiaceae and class Betaproteobacteria. Limnobacter species have the ability to oxidize thiosulfate.
