= Cupriavidus laharis =

Scientific classification
- Domain: Bacteria
- Kingdom: Pseudomonadati
- Phylum: Pseudomonadota
- Class: Betaproteobacteria
- Order: Burkholderiales
- Family: Burkholderiaceae
- Genus: Cupriavidus
- Species: C. laharis

Binomial name
- Cupriavidus laharis Sato et al. 2006

Type strain
- CCUG 53908, CIP 108726, DSM 19552, KCTC 22126, LMG 23954, LMG 23992, PNCM 10347, strain 1263a

Species of bacterium

Cupriavidus laharis is a Gram-negative, oxidase- and catalase-positive, hydrogen-oxidizing, aerobic, non-spore-forming, motile bacterium with peritrichous flagella of the genus Cupriavidus and family Burkholderiaceae which was isolated from volcanic mudflow deposits on Mount Pinatubo in the Philippines. Colonies of Cupriavidus laharis are opaque and white.
