= Chitinimonas =

Scientific classification
- Domain: Bacteria
- Kingdom: Pseudomonadati
- Phylum: Pseudomonadota
- Class: Betaproteobacteria
- Order: Burkholderiales
- Family: Burkholderiaceae
- Genus: Chitinimonas; Chang et al. 2004

Type species
- Chitinimonas taiwanensis

Species
- Chitinimonas koreensis Chitinimonas lacunae Chitinimonas naiadis Chitinimonas prasina Chitinimonas taiwanensis Chitinimonas viridis

Genus of bacteria

Chitinimonas is a genus of Gram-negative, chitinolytic, rod-shaped bacteria which have flagella from the family Burkholderiaceae which belongs to the class Betaproteobacteria. All species of Chitinimonas have been found in regions of Asia. Species of this genus are found to be both aerobic and anaerobic. Chitinimonas is optimally grown and cultured at 25 °C to 37 °C, with very little concentrations of NaCl.

== Species ==
Chitinimonas taiwanensis

Chitinimonas koreensis

Chitinimonas prasina

Chitinimonas naiadis

Chitinimonas viridis

Chitinimonas lacunae
