= Pandoraea =

Scientific classification
- Domain: Bacteria
- Kingdom: Pseudomonadati
- Phylum: Pseudomonadota
- Class: Betaproteobacteria
- Order: Burkholderiales
- Family: Burkholderiaceae
- Genus: Pandoraea; Coenye et al. 2000

Type species
- Pandoraea apista

Species
- Pandoraea apista; Pandoraea faecigallinarum; Pandoraea norimbergensis; Pandoraea oxalativorans; Pandoraea pnomenusa; Pandoraea pulmonicola; Pandoraea sputorum; Pandoraea thiooxydans; Pandoraea vervacti

Genus of bacteria

Pandoraea is a genus of Gram-negative, non-spore-forming, motile bacteria with a single polar flagellum, from the family Burkholderiaceae and class Betaproteobacteria.

Pandoraea spp. are increasingly reported as opportunistic pathogens in patients with cystic fibrosis, immunocompromised hosts, and critically ill individuals. These bacteria display intrinsic multidrug resistance, with frequent resistance to β-lactams, aminoglycosides, fluoroquinolones and polymyxins. Imipenem and trimethoprim-sulfamethoxazole are the agents that most often retain activity, although clinical data remain limited and standardized susceptibility breakpoints are lacking.
