= Janet Sprent =

British botanist

- Born: 1934 (age 91–92)
- Education: Imperial College London, University of Tasmania, University of London
- Awards: DSc University of London; DAg Swedish University of Agricultural Sciences; FRSE; OBE; Paraburkholderia sprentiae (syn. Burkholderia sprentiae)
- Scientific career
- Fields: Botanist
- Workplaces: University of Dundee

Janet Irene Sprent, FRSE OBE (born 1934) is a British botanical scientist, and emeritus professor at the University of Dundee.

== Education and career ==
After graduating from Imperial College London in 1954 with a BSc and ARCS, Sprent worked for a year at Rothamsted Experimental Station before undertaking a PhD at the University of Tasmania. She taught botany for two years at Rochester Grammar School before being awarded a lectureship at Goldsmiths College in 1960. Sprent moved to Dundee, Scotland, in 1967, where she secured a research fellowship at the University of Dundee. She became dean of the Faculty of Science and Engineering in 1987, and was awarded a personal chair in 1989. She also served as the Head of the Department of Biological Sciences from 1992 to 1995. Eventually, she became the deputy principal of Dundee University from 1995 until her retirement in 1998.

== Research areas ==
Sprent's primary research interests lie in the field of nitrogen fixation in legumes. Sprent would bring her works with across multiple different countries as she continued to research legume taxonomy and how they have evolved through processes such as nodulation.

== Awards and recognition ==
In recognition of the contribution she has made to the understanding of nitrogen fixation in legume symbioses, Sprent was awarded a Doctor of Science degree by the University of London in 1988. Then, in 2006, an honorary Doctor of Agriculture from the Swedish University of Agricultural Sciences. She was inducted as a Fellow of the Royal Society of Edinburgh in 1990 and awarded an OBE in 1996. In 2013, the nitrogen-fixing bacterium Burkholderia sprentiae (later renamed Paraburkholderia sprentiae) was named after her. She was awarded Honorary Membership of the British Ecological Society and, in 2021, the Journal of Ecology commissioned its inaugural Sprent Review, a series of annual, commissioned reviews in ecological science, named in honour of her.

== Bibliography ==
- Sprent, Janet (2009), Legume Nodulation: A Global Perspective, Wiley-Blackwell
- Dilworth, Michael J.; James, Euan K.; Sprent, Janet; Newton, William E. (2008), Nitrogen-Fixing Leguminous Symbioses (Nitrogen Fixation: Origins, Applications, and Research Progress), Springer
- Sprent, Janet (2001), Nodulation in Legumes, Royal Botanic Gardens
- Sprent, Peter; Sprent, Janet I. (1995), Suilven's World: A Land and Its People, Northwest Press
- Sprent, Janet I.; McKey, D. (1994), Advances in Legume Systematics. Part 5: The Nitrogen Factor, Royal Botanic Gardens, Kew
- Sprent, Janet I.; Sprent, Peter (1990), Nitrogen Fixing Organisms: Pure and Applied Aspects, Springer
- Sprent, Janet (1987), The Ecology of the Nitrogen Cycle, Cambridge University Press
- Sprent, Janet (1979), Biology of Nitrogen-fixing Organisms (European plant biology series), McGraw Hill
