= Paraburkholderia tuberum =

Scientific classification
- Domain: Bacteria
- Kingdom: Pseudomonadati
- Phylum: Pseudomonadota
- Class: Betaproteobacteria
- Order: Burkholderiales
- Family: Burkholderiaceae
- Genus: Paraburkholderia
- Species: P. tuberum

Binomial name
- Paraburkholderia tuberum (Vandamme et al. 2003) Sawana et al. 2015

Synonyms
- Burkholderia tuberum Vandamme et al. 2003

Species of bacterium

Paraburkholderia tuberum is a species of bacteria that is capable of symbiotic nitrogen fixation with the legume Aspalathus carnosa.
