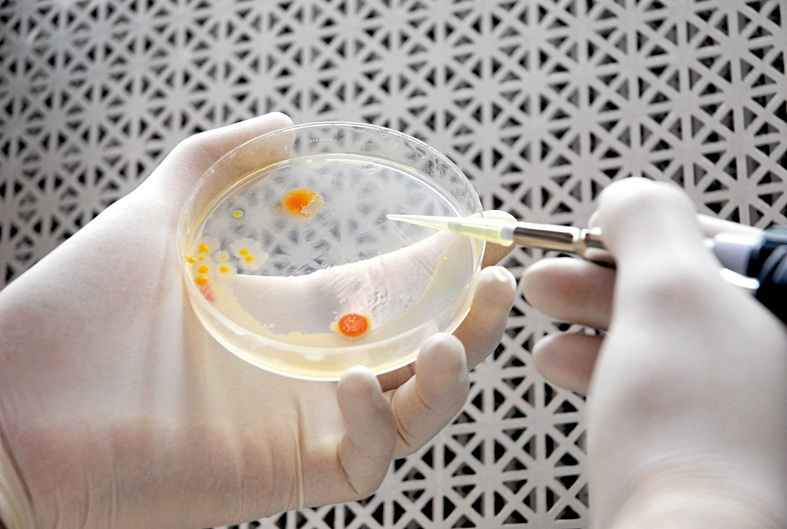

Scientific classification
- Domain: Bacteria
- Kingdom: Pseudomonadati
- Phylum: Pseudomonadota
- Class: Betaproteobacteria
- Order: Burkholderiales
- Family: Burkholderiaceae
- Genus: Cupriavidus; Makkar and Casida 1987

Species
- C. alkaliphilus C. basilensis C. campinensis C. gilardii C. laharis C. metallidurans C. necator C. nantongensis C. numazuensis C. oxalaticus C. pampae C. pauculus C. pinatubonensis C. plantarum C. respiraculi C. taiwanensis C. yeoncheonensis

= Cupriavidus =

Genus of bacteria

Cupriavidus is a genus of bacteria that includes the former genus Wautersia. They are characterized as Gram-negative, motile, rod-shaped organisms with oxidative metabolism. They possess peritrichous flagella, are obligate aerobic organisms, and are chemoorganotrophic or chemolithotrophic. Resistance to metals (including copper) has been described. These organisms have been found in both soil and in clinical isolates.
