= Codex Basilensis =

Codex Basilensis or Codex Basiliensis, refers to codices that are housed at the Basel University Library in Basel, including:

- Codex Basilensis A. N. III. 12 (07 on the list Gregory-Aland) — the four Gospels in Greek in uncial letters; 8th century;
- Codex Basilensis A. N. IV. 2 (1 on the list Gregory-Aland) — New Testament (except Apocalypse) in Greek in minuscule letters; 12th century;
- Codex Basiliensis A. N. IV. 1 (2 on the list Gregory-Aland) — the four Gospels in Greek in minuscule letters; 11th/12th century;
- Codex Basilensis A. N. IV. 4 (2815 on the list Gregory-Aland) — Acts of the Apostles and Pauline epistles in Greek in minuscule letters; 12th century
- Codex Basilensis A. N. IV. 5 (2816 on the list Gregory-Aland) — Acts of the Apostles and Pauline epistles in Greek in minuscule letters; 15th century
- Codex Basilensis A. N. III. 11 (2817 on the list Gregory-Aland) — Pauline epistles in Greek in minuscule letters; 12th century
- Codex Basilensis A. N. III. 15 (817 on the list Gregory-Aland) — Gospels in Greek in minuscule letters; 15th century
