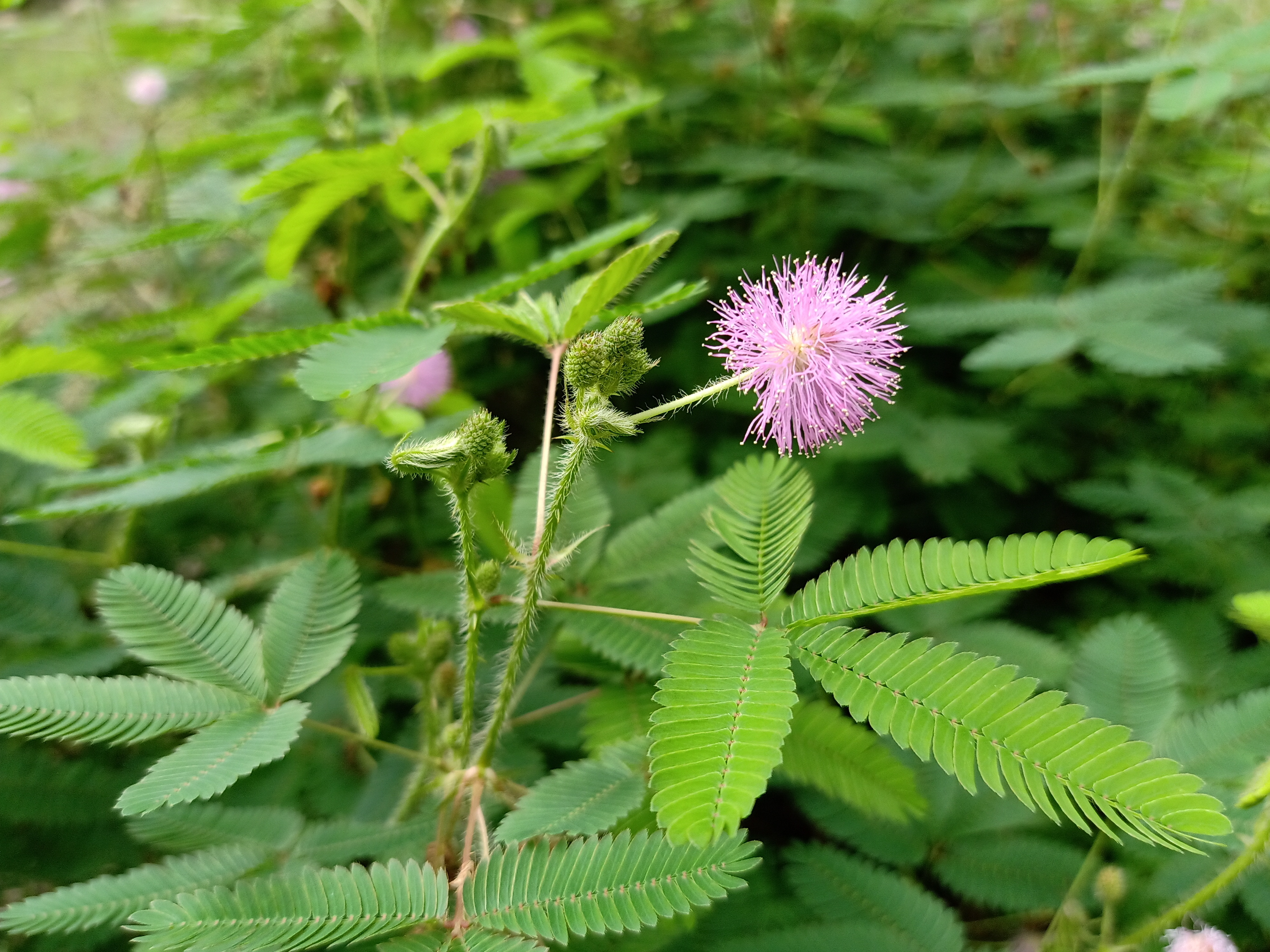
- Flower head and leaves

Conservation status
- Least Concern (IUCN 3.1)

Scientific classification
- Kingdom: Plantae
- Clade: Tracheophytes
- Clade: Angiosperms
- Clade: Eudicots
- Clade: Rosids
- Order: Fabales
- Family: Fabaceae
- Subfamily: Caesalpinioideae
- Clade: Mimosoid clade
- Genus: Mimosa
- Species: M. pudica

Binomial name
- Mimosa pudica L.

= Mimosa pudica =

Species of creeping annual plant

Mimosa pudica (also called sensitive plant, sleepy grass, sleepy plant, action plant, humble plant, touch-me-not, touch-and-die, shame plant or shy plant) is a creeping annual or perennial flowering plant of the pea/legume family Fabaceae. It is often grown for its curiosity value: the sensitive compound leaves quickly fold inward and droop when touched or shaken and re-open a few minutes later. For this reason, this species is commonly cited as an example of rapid plant movement. Like a number of other plant species, it undergoes changes in leaf orientation termed "sleep" or nyctinastic movement. The foliage closes during darkness and reopens in light. This was first studied by French scientist Jean-Jacques d'Ortous. In the UK it has gained the Royal Horticultural Society's Award of Garden Merit.

The species is native to the Caribbean and South and Central America, but is now a pantropical weed, and can now be found in the Southern United States, South Asia, East Asia, Southeast Asia, Micronesia, Australia, South Africa, and West Africa as well. It is not shade-tolerant and is primarily found on soils with low nutrient concentrations.

== Taxonomy ==
Mimosa pudica was first formally described by Carl Linnaeus in Species Plantarum in 1753. The species epithet, pudica, is Latin for "shamefast", "bashful", or "shrinking", alluding to its shrinking reaction to contact.

== Description ==
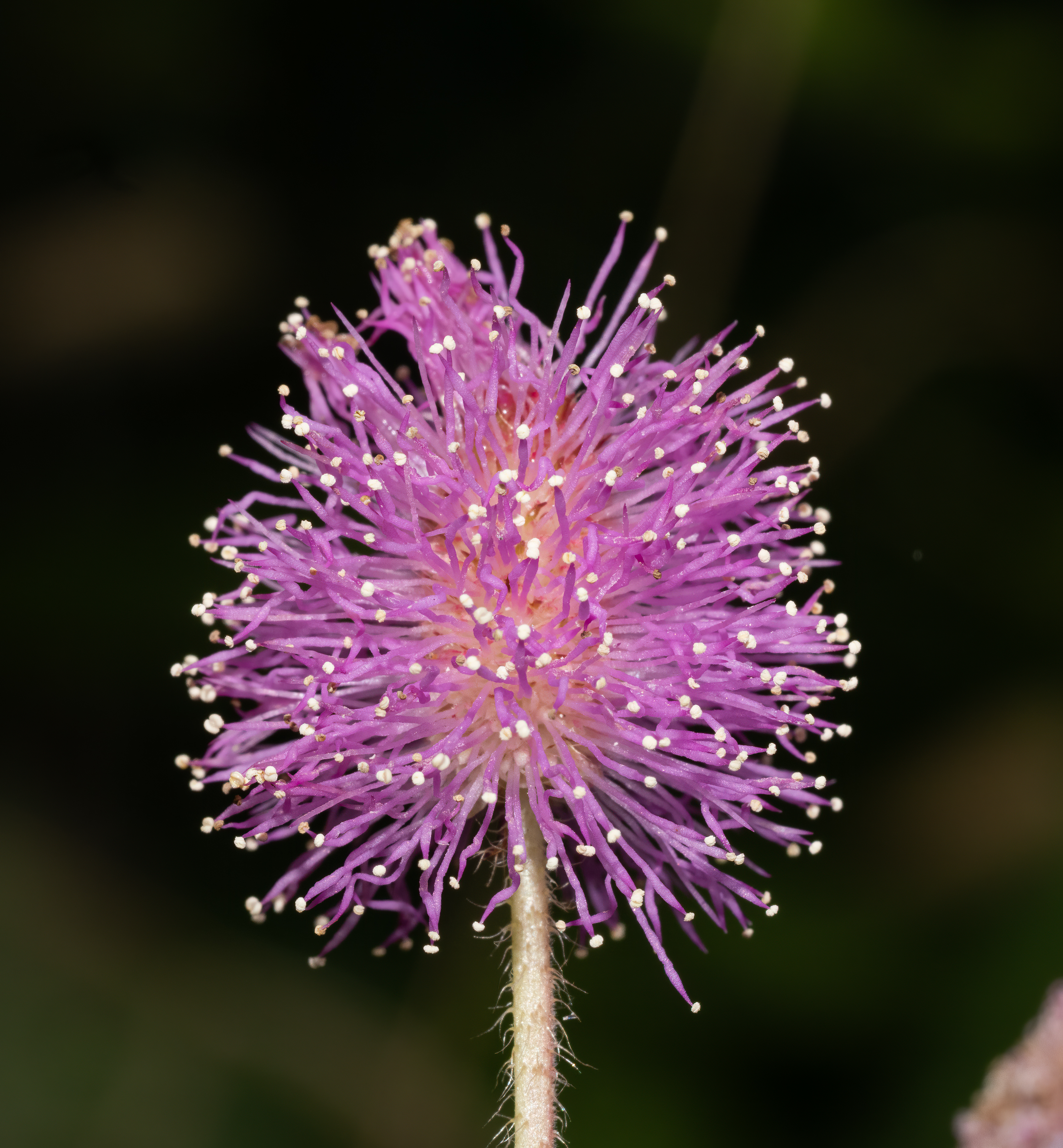
Inflorescence

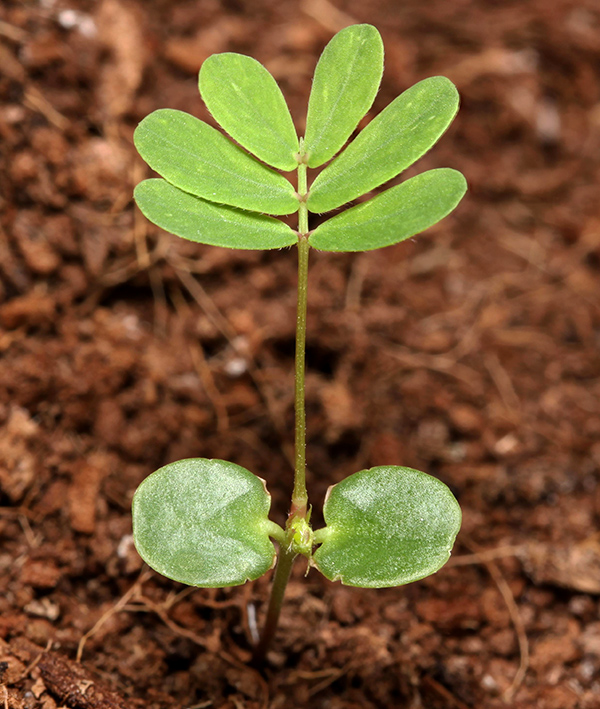
Seedling with two cotyledons and first true leaf with only 6 leaflets

The stem is erect in young plants but becomes creeping or trailing with age. It can hang very low and become floppy. The stem is slender, branching, and sparsely to densely prickly, growing to a length of 1.5 m (5 ft). The erect height of M. pudica usually reaches around ~30 cm (~1 ft).

The leaves are bipinnately compound, with one or two pinnae pairs, and 10–26 leaflets per pinna. The petioles are also prickly. Pedunculate (stalked) pale pink or purple flower heads arise from the leaf axils in mid-summer with more and more flowers as the plant gets older. A single flower survives for less than a day, and usually dies completely by the next day. Flowers of M. pudica are very brittle and soft. The globose to ovoid heads are 8–10 mm (0.3–0.4 in) in diameter (excluding the stamens). On close examination, it is seen that the floret petals are red in their upper part and the filaments are pink to lavender. Pollens are circular with approximately 8 microns in diameter.

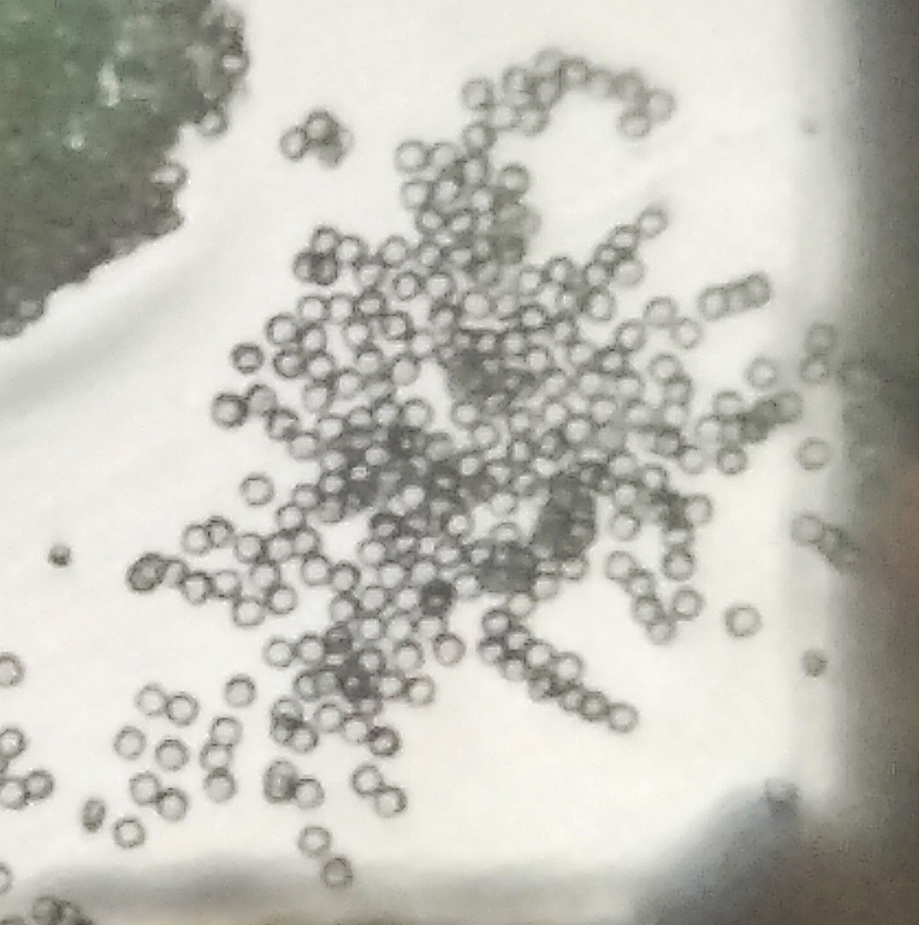
Pollen

The fruit consists of clusters of two to eight pods from 1–2 cm (0.4–0.8 in) long each, these being prickly on the margins. The pods break into two to five segments and contain pale brown seeds about 2.5 mm (0.1 in) long. The flowers are insect-pollinated and wind-pollinated. The seeds have hard seed coats which restrict germination and make osmotic pressure and soil acidity less significant hindrances. High temperatures are the main stimuli that cause the seeds to end dormancy.

The roots of Mimosa pudica produce carbon disulfide, an antifeedant that prevents certain pathogenic and mycorrhizal fungi from growing within the plant's rhizosphere. This allows the formation of nodules on the roots of the plant that contain endosymbiotic diazotrophs, which fix nitrogen.

Mimosa pudica is a tetraploid (2n = 52).

== Plant movement ==
Video of plant closing when touched

The leaflets close when stimulated in various ways, such as warming, touching, blowing, and shaking, which are all encapsulated within mechanical or electrical stimulation. Movements in response to these stimuli have been termed seismonastic movements. This reflex may have evolved as a defense mechanism to disincentivize predators, or alternatively to shade the plant in order to reduce water loss due to evaporation. The main structure mechanistically responsible for the drooping of the leaves is the pulvinus. The stimulus is transmitted as an action potential from a stimulated leaflet to the leaflet's swollen base (pulvinus), and from there to the pulvini of the other leaflets, which run along the length of the leaf's rachis. The action potential then passes into the petiole, and finally to the large pulvinus at the end of the petiole, where the leaf attaches to the stem. The pulvini cells gain and lose turgor due to water moving in and out of these cells, and multiple ion concentrations play a role in the manipulation of water movement.

Similar to the Venus flytrap's trigger hairs, M. pudica's leaves are hypersensitive to touch. In line with the touch-sensing function used for tasks such as defense or nutrient maintenance, these parts have mechanoreceptors linked to mechanosensitive channels that can conduct calcium ions and indirectly relative anions upon touch stimulation, giving rise to depolarization and the initiation of an action potential (AP). They also have voltage-sensitive potassium channels that promote hyperpolarization and turgor formation. Such sensitive plants fire all-or-nothing type APs, similar to those seen in animals.

This movement of folding inwards is energetically costly for the plant and also interferes with the process of photosynthesis.

== Distribution and habitat ==
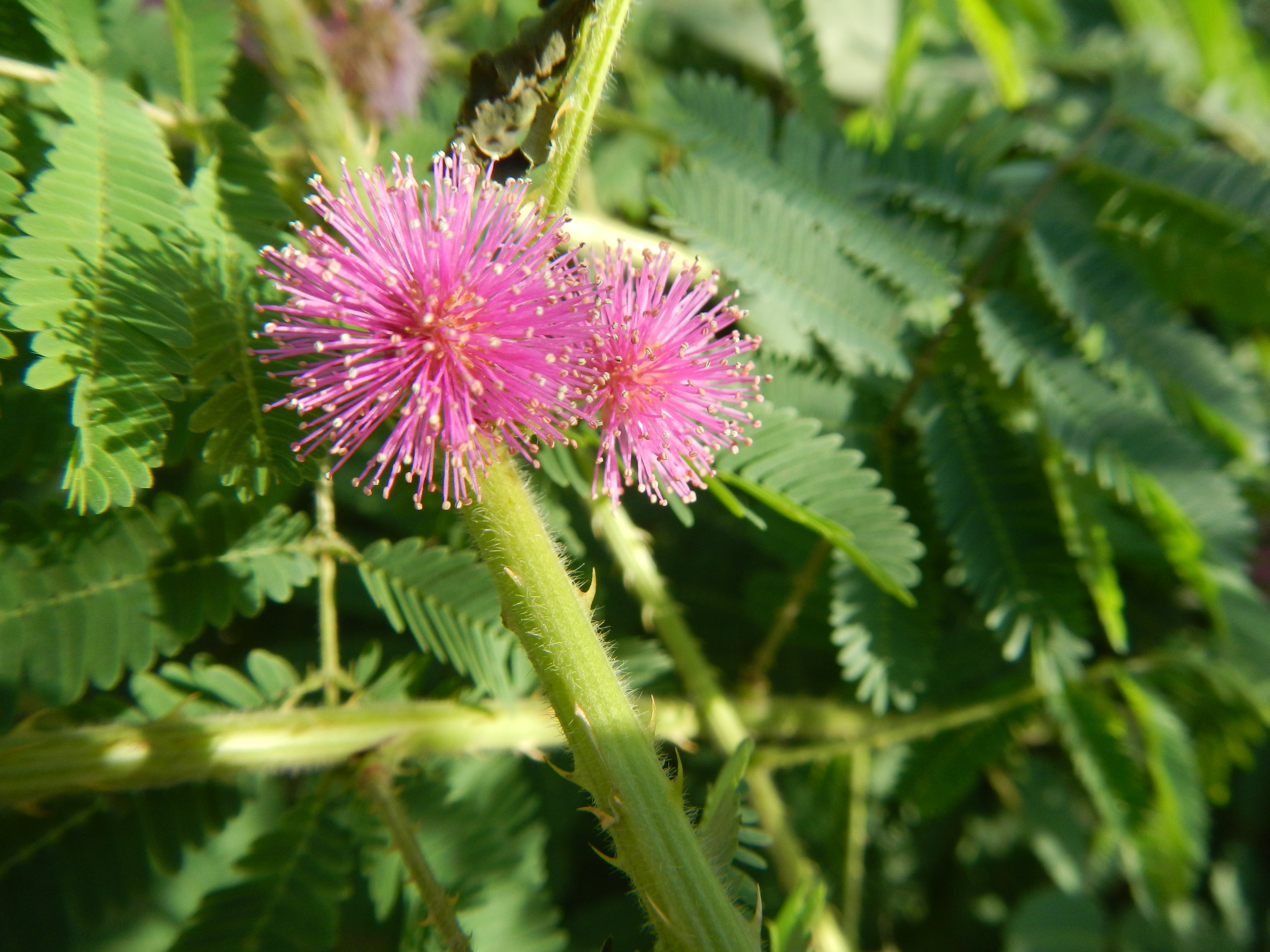
Mimosa pudica in Angat, Bulacan, Philippines

Mimosa pudica is native to the tropical Americas. It can also be found in Asian countries such as Singapore, Bangladesh, Thailand, India, Nepal, Indonesia, Taiwan, Malaysia, the Philippines, Vietnam, Cambodia, Laos, Japan, and Sri Lanka. It has been introduced to many other regions and is regarded as an invasive species in Tanzania, South and Southeast Asia, and many Pacific islands. It is regarded as invasive in parts of Australia and is a declared weed in the Northern Territory, and Western Australia although not naturalized there. Control is recommended in Queensland.

It has also been introduced to Uganda, Ghana, Nigeria, Seychelles, Mauritius and East Asia but is not regarded as invasive in those places. In the United States, it grows in Louisiana, Florida, Hawaii, Tennessee, Virginia, Maryland, Puerto Rico, Texas, Alabama, Arkansas, Mississippi, North Carolina, Georgia, the territory of Guam, and the Virgin Islands.

== Predators ==
Mimosa pudica has several natural predators, such as the spider mite and mimosa webworm. Both of these insects wrap the leaflets in webs that hinder the responsive closing. Webbed leaves are noticeable as they become brown fossilized remnants after an attack. The Mimosa webworm is composed of two generations that arise at different seasons. This makes prevention difficult and requires proper timing of insecticides to avoid aiding other predators. Once the larvae become steel-gray moths, they are harmless to the plant but lay more eggs.

== Agricultural impact ==
The species can be a weed for tropical crops, particularly when fields are hand-cultivated. Crops it tends to affect are corn, coconuts, tomatoes, cotton, coffee, bananas, soybeans, papaya, and sugar cane. Dry thickets may become a fire hazard. In some cases, it has become a forage plant although the variety in Hawaii is reported to be toxic to livestock.

In addition, Mimosa pudica can change the physico-chemical properties of the soil it invades; total nitrogen and potassium, for example, have been seen to increase in significantly invaded areas.

=== Phytoremediation ===
Thirty-six native Thai plant species were tested to see which conducted the most phytoremediation of arsenic-polluted soils caused by tin mines. Mimosa pudica was one of the four species that significantly extracted and bioaccumulated the pollutant into its leaves. Other studies have found that Mimosa pudica extracts heavy metals such as copper, lead, tin, and zinc from polluted soils. In principle, this accumulative behavior could be used to decontaminate some polluted soils.

=== Nitrogen fixation ===
If nitrogen-fixing bacteria are present in the environment, Mimosa pudica may form root nodules for them to inhabit. These bacteria are able to convert atmospheric nitrogen into ammonia that plants can use for growth, i.e. nitrogen fixation.

As much as 60% of the nitrogen found in Mimosa pudica can be attributed to nitrogen fixation by its captive bacteria. Burkholderia phymatum STM815^{T} and Cupriavidus taiwanensis LMG19424^{T} are beta-rhizobial strains of diazotrophs that are highly effective at fixing nitrogen when coupled with M. pudica. Burkholderia is also shown to be a strong symbiont of Mimosa pudica in nitrogen-poor soils in regions like Cerrado and Caatinga.

== Cultivation ==
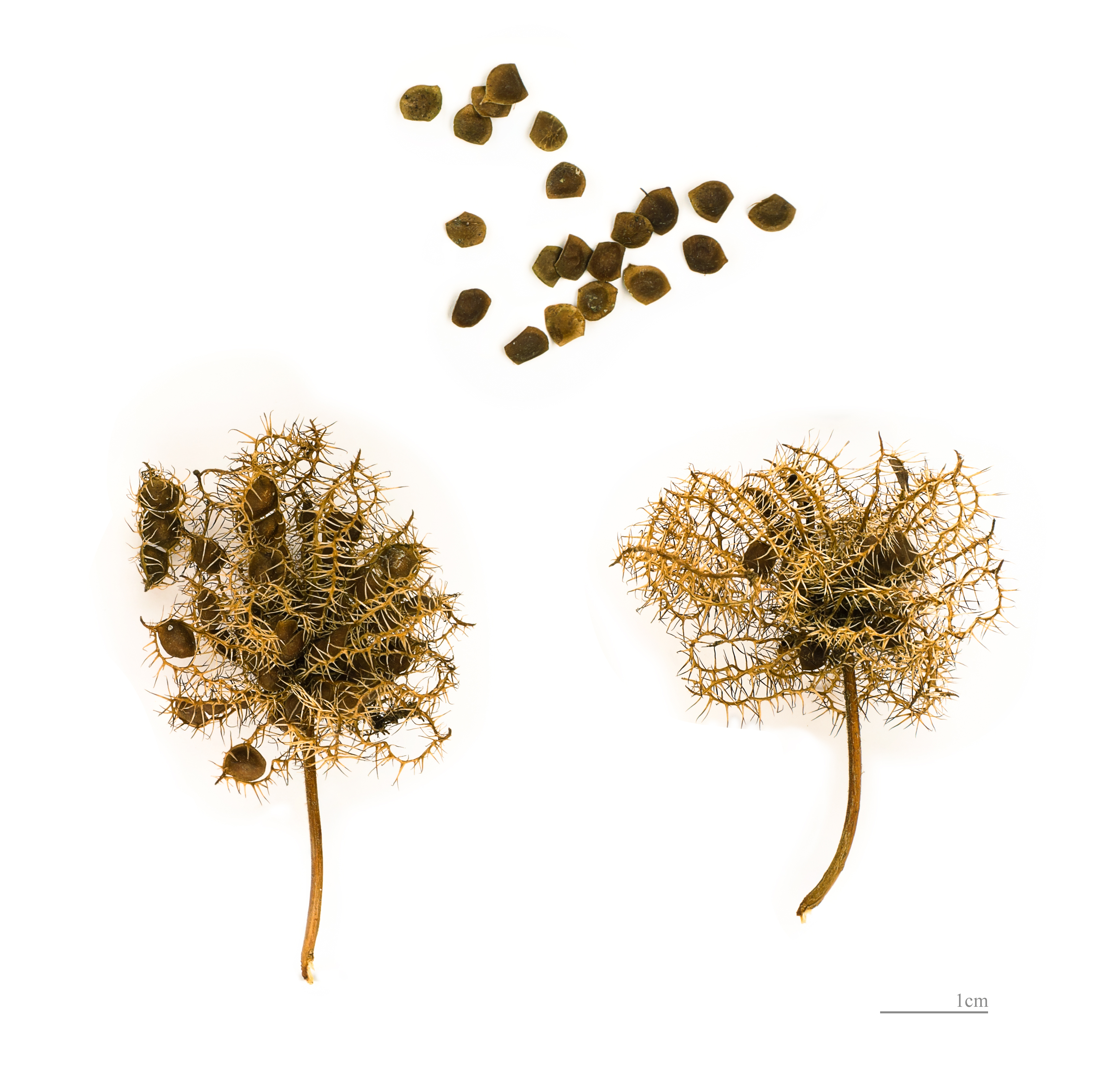
Infructescences with seed

In cultivation, this plant is most often grown as an indoor short lived perennial but is also grown for groundcover. Propagation is generally by seed. Germination should take place in 2-3 weeks. Mimosa pudica grows most effectively in nutrient-poor soil that allows for substantial water drainage. However, this plant is also shown to grow in scalped and eroded subsoils. Typically, disrupted soil is necessary in order for M. pudica to become established in an area. Additionally, the plant is shade intolerant and frost-sensitive, meaning that it does not tolerate low levels of light or cold temperatures. Mimosa pudica does not compete for resources with larger foliage or forest canopy undergrowth.

In temperate zones it must be grown under protection, where the temperature falls below 13 °C (55 °F).

== Chemical constituents ==
Mimosa pudica contains the toxic alkaloid mimosine, which has been found to also have antiproliferative and apoptotic effects. The extracts of Mimosa pudica immobilize the filariform larvae of Strongyloides stercoralis in less than one hour. Aqueous extracts of the roots of the plant have shown significant neutralizing effects in the lethality of the venom of the monocled cobra (Naja kaouthia). It appears to inhibit the myotoxicity and enzyme activity of cobra venom.

Mimosa pudica demonstrates both antioxidant and antibacterial properties. This plant has also been demonstrated to be non-toxic in brine shrimp lethality tests, which suggests that M. pudica has low levels of toxicity. Chemical analysis has shown that Mimosa pudica contains various compounds, including "alkaloids, flavonoid C-glycosides, sterols, terenoids, tannins, saponin and fatty acids". The roots of the plant have been shown to contain up to 10% tannin. A substance similar to adrenaline has been found within the plant's leaves. Mimosa pudica's seeds produce mucilage made up of D-glucuronic acid and D-xylose. Additionally, extracts of M. pudica have been shown to contain crocetin-dimethylester, tubulin, and green-yellow fatty oils. A new class of phytohormone turgorines, which are derivatives of gallic acid 4-O-(β-D-glucopyranosyl-6'-sulfate), have been discovered within the plant.

The nitrogen-fixing properties of Mimosa pudica contribute to a high nitrogen content within the plant's leaves. The leaves of M. pudica also contain a wide range of carbon to mineral content, as well as a large variation in ^{13}C values. The correlation between these two numbers suggests that significant ecological adaptation has occurred among the varieties of M. pudica in Brazil.

The roots contain sac-like structures that release organic and organosulfur compounds including SO_{2}, methylsulfinic acid, pyruvic acid, lactic acid, ethanesulfinic acid, propane sulfinic acid, 2-mercaptoaniline, S-propyl propane 1-thiosulfinate, and thioformaldehyde, an elusive and highly unstable compound never before reported to be emitted by a plant.

== Research with Mimosa pudica ==
Leaflets folding inward

Wilhelm Pfeffer, a German botanist during the 19th century, used Mimosa in one of the first experiments testing plant habituation. Further experimentation was done in 1965 when Holmes and Gruenberg discovered that Mimosa could distinguish between two stimuli, a water drop and a finger touch. Their findings also demonstrated that the habituated behavior was not due to fatigue since the leaf-folding response returned when another stimulus was presented.

Electrical signaling experiments were conducted on Mimosa pudica, where 1.3–1.5 volts and 2–10 μC of charge acted as the threshold to induce closing of the leaves. This topic was further explored in 2017 by neuroscientist Greg Gage who connected Mimosa pudica to Dionaea muscipula, better known as the Venus flytrap. Both plants had electrical wiring connecting them and were linked to an electrocardiogram. The results showed how causing an action potential in one plant led to an electrical response, causing both plants to respond.

Experiments were made on how anesthetics for animals could affect Mimosa pudica. These experiments showed that anesthetics cause narcosis of the motor organs, which was observed by the application of volatile ether, chloroform, carbon tetrachloride, hydrogen sulfide, ammonia, formaldehyde, and other substances. In a preclinical study, methanolic extract of Mimosa pudica showed significant antidiabetic and antihyperlipidemic activities in streptozotocin-induced diabetic rats.

In 2018, two research groups from the Universities of Palermo (Italy) and Lugano (Switzerland) demonstrated the feasibility of using such plant as a building block for creating plant-based controllable two-color displays, exploiting air jets instead of electrical or touch-based stimulation.

In a 2022 study in the journal Nature Communications, researchers used simultaneous recordings of cytosolic Ca^{2+} and electrical signals to show that rapid changes in Ca^{2+} coupled with action and variation potentials trigger rapid movements in wounded M. pudica. Moreover, they found that disrupting cytosolic Ca^{2+} dynamics through pharmacological manipulation or CRISPR-Cas9 genome editing made M. pudica more vulnerable to herbivorous insect attacks. The findings suggest that these rapid movements based on propagating Ca^{2+} and electrical signals serve a protective role for the plant against insect herbivory.

== Habitual learning ==
The simplest form of learning is the ability of an organism to have a certain level of sensitivity to the environment that allows the organism to respond to potentially harmful stimuli as well as the capability to learn and filter out irrelevant stimuli (habituation) or increase the response due to a learned stimulus (sensitization). Research done by scientist Monica Gagliano has shown habituation in Mimosa pudica. In the experiment, M. pudica plants were repeatedly dropped until they stopped reacting to the stimulus. This seemed to show that the plants were learning that this disturbance did not hurt them, and ceased to react. However, to show that it was not that the plants were simply exhausted, some plants were exposed to a new stimulus (being shaken). These plants reacted fully to this stimulus, despite not reacting to the act of being dropped, suggesting the plants really had learned to recognize the "feeling" of being dropped. Further experiments showed that the plants continued to not react to dropping for at least 28 days, suggesting that they have the capacity for some form of memory associated with their habituation.

In this experiment, researcher Monica Gagliano wanted to study if Mimosa plants in low-light conditions would have a greater potential for learning than those grown in high light. Plants that live in low-light environments have less of an opportunity for photosynthesis compared to plants that live in high-light environments where sunshine is not a problem. When the Mimosa plant folds in its leaves as a defensive mechanism there is an energetic trade off, since folding its leaves reduces the amount of photosynthesis the Mimosa can perform during the closed period by 40%, but provides a rapid defensive mechanism against potentially harmful predators or external stimulation.

Since the low-light plants were already in low-energy environments and folding their leaves would be more energetically costly to the plant, researchers predicted the low-light plants would have adapted to have faster habitual learning capabilities so they could filter out unharmful stimuli to increase their energy production. Plants were either grown in high-light or low-light conditions. The plants were stimulated by being dropped from 15 cm for either a single drop or consecutive training sessions where the plants were repeatedly dropped. The plants were then shaken as a novel stimuli to test that the plants were suppressing their leaf folding reflex from habitual learning and not from exhaustion (dishabituation test). The first group was tested to see if short-term memory was enough for plants to modify their behaviour.

Regardless of what light group the plants were in, one drop was not enough for the plants to learn to ignore the stimulation. For the groups that were dropped repetitively, the plants stopped folding their leaves and were even fully open after a drop before the end of the trainings. The low-light plants learned faster to ignore the dropping stimulation than the high-light plants. When the plants were shaken, they responded immediately by folding their leaves, which suggests that the plants were not ignoring the dropping stimulation due to exhaustion. This research suggests that the Mimosa has the capability for habitual learning and memory storage and that Mimosa plants grown in low-light conditions have faster learning mechanisms so they can reduce the amount of time their leaves are unnecessarily closed to optimize energy production. Further research suggests that both memory and habituation are present in wild Mimosa, and that they may be able to adjust habituation based on leaf age and pollination requirements.

Given that plants lack a central nervous system, the means by which they send and store information is not obvious. There are two hypotheses for memory in Mimosa, neither of which has yet been generally accepted. The first is that when the plant is stimulated, it releases a surge of calcium ions that are sensed by the protein calmodulin. The relationship between the ions and proteins are thought to stimulate voltage-gated ion channels which cause electrical signals, which could be the base of plant long-term memory. The other hypothesis is that plant cells act similarly to neural cells by creating electrical gradients by opening and closing ion channels and passing it along cell junctions. The information passed along can control which genes are turned on and which genes are turned off, which could be a mode for long-term memory.

== See also ==
- Codariocalyx motorius
- Venus flytrap
