= Tryptic soy broth =

Growth medium for bacteria

Tryptic soy broth or Trypticase soy broth (frequently abbreviated as TSB) is used in microbiology laboratories as a culture broth to grow aerobic and facultative anaerobic bacteria. It is a general purpose medium that is routinely used to grow bacteria which tend to have high nutritional requirements (i.e., they are fastidious).

== Uses ==
Sterility test medium in USP and EP as well as for inocula preparation for CLSI standards.

TSB is frequently used in commercial diagnostics in conjunction with the additive sodium thioglycolate which promotes growth of anaerobes.

== Preparation ==
To prepare 1 liter of TSB, the following ingredients are dissolved under gentle heat. Adjustments to pH should be made using 1N HCl or 1N NaOH to reach a final target pH of 7.3 ± 0.2 at 25°C. The solution is then autoclaved for 15 minutes at 121°C.

Tryptic Soy Agar contains per liter:

- 17 g pancreatic digest of casein
- 3 g peptic digest of soybean meal/flour
- 5 g sodium chloride
- 2.5g dipotassium phosphate (K_{2}HPO_{4})
- 2.5g glucose
