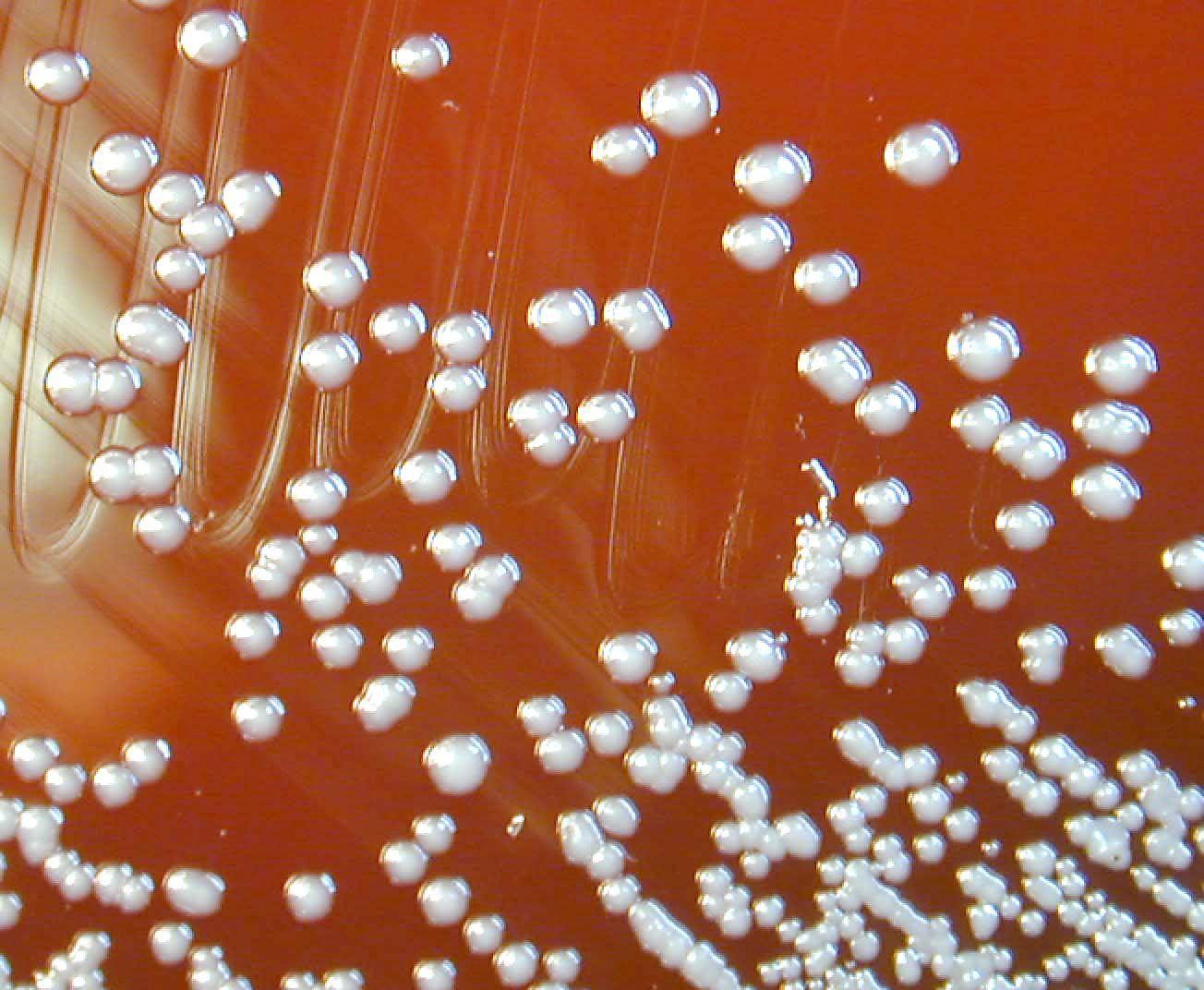
- Burkholderia pseudomallei colonies on a blood agar plate.

Scientific classification
- Domain: Bacteria
- Kingdom: Pseudomonadati
- Phylum: Pseudomonadota
- Class: Betaproteobacteria
- Order: Burkholderiales
- Family: Burkholderiaceae; Garrity et al. 2006

Genera
- Burkholderia; Caballeronia; Chitinimonas; Cupriavidus; Lautropia; Limnobacter; Mycetohabitans; Pandoraea; Paraburkholderia; Pararobbsia; Paucimonas; Polynucleobacter; Robbsia; Ralstonia; Thermothrix; Trinickia; Wautersia

= Burkholderiaceae =

Family of bacteria

The Burkholderiaceae are a family of bacteria included in the order Burkholderiales. It includes some pathogenic species, such as Burkholderia mallei (glanders) and Burkholderia pseudomallei (melioidosis). This family was found to be enriched in scale-eating pupfish (Cyprinodon desquamator) guts, even after being fed a common laboratory diet, suggesting it may aid in scale-digestion (Heras and Martin 2022).
