= RsmV sRNA =

RsmV is a small non-coding RNA (sRNA) that has been found first in Pseudomonas aeruginosa genomes. It is a member of the Rsm family of sRNAs (RsmZ, RsmY, RsmX, and RsmW), which are known to play a role in regulating gene expression. RsmV differs from other Rsm sRNAs by being GacA-independent and able of binding RsmA and RsmF proteins.

Phylogenetic distribution of RsmV sRNA can be divided in three subgroups of rsmV alleles:

- rsmVa, exclusively present in P. aeruginosa chromosomes,
- rsmVb, characteristic of strains from P. chlororaphis clades, and
- rsmVc, found in strains from P. fluorescens and P. protegens clades, and other non-clustered isolates.

RsmV is approximately 100 nucleotides in length.

== See also ==
- PrrB/RsmZ RNA family
- RsmY RNA family
- RsmX
- RsmW sRNA
- CsrA protein
- CsrB/RsmB RNA family
- CsrC RNA family
