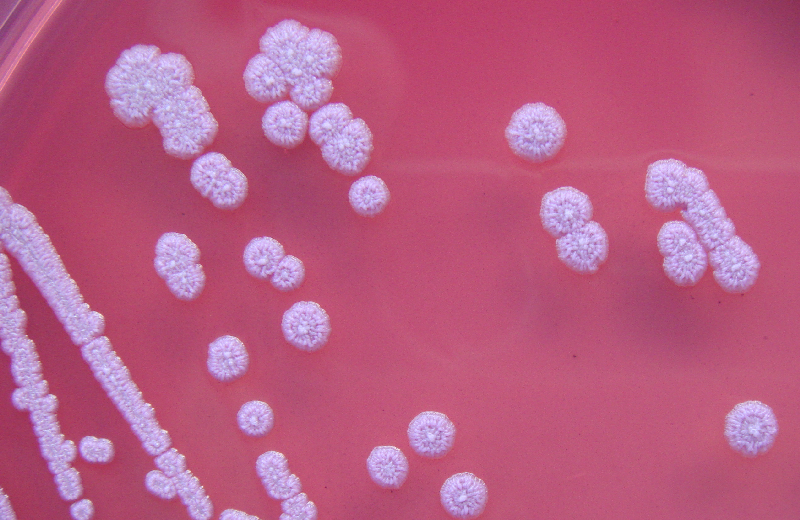
- Burkholderia pseudomallei colonies on Ashdown's agar showing the characteristic cornflower head morphology

Scientific classification
- Domain: Bacteria
- Kingdom: Pseudomonadati
- Phylum: Pseudomonadota
- Class: Betaproteobacteria
- Order: Burkholderiales
- Family: Burkholderiaceae
- Genus: Burkholderia
- Species: B. pseudomallei

Binomial name
- Burkholderia pseudomallei (Whitmore 1913); Yabuuchi et al. 1993

Synonyms
- Bacillus pseudomallei Whitmore 1913; Bacterium whitmori Stanton and Fletcher 1921; Malleomyces pseudomallei Breed 1939; Loefflerella pseudomallei Brindle and Cowan 1951; Pfeiferella pseudomallei Pseudomonas pseudomallei (Whitmore 1913) Haynes 1957

= Burkholderia pseudomallei =

Species of tropical soil-dwelling bacterium

Burkholderia pseudomallei (Note: Named after Walter Burkholder who first described it) (also known as Pseudomonas pseudomallei) is a Gram-negative, bipolar, aerobic, motile rod-shaped bacterium. It is a soil-dwelling bacterium endemic in tropical and subtropical regions worldwide, particularly in Thailand and northern Australia. It was reported in 2008 that there had been an expansion of the affected regions due to significant natural disasters, and it could be found in Southern China, Hong Kong, and countries in the Americas. B. pseudomallei, amongst other pathogens, has been found in monkeys imported into the United States from Asia for laboratory use, posing a risk that the pathogen could be introduced into the country.

Although it is mainly a soil-dwelling bacterium, one study showed that Burkholderia pseudomallei survived in distilled water for 16 years, demonstrating that it is capable of living in water if a specific environment is provided. It is resistant to a variety of harsh conditions including nutrient deficiency, extreme temperature or pH. It infects humans, causing the disease melioidosis; mortality is 20–50% even with treatment. The CDC classifies it as a "Tier 1 select agent" with potential as a bioterrorism agent. It infects other animals, most commonly livestock such as goats, pigs, and sheep, less frequently. It is also capable of infecting plants in a laboratory setting.

Burkholderia pseudomallei measures 2–5 μm in length and 0.4–0.8 μm in diameter and is capable of self-propulsion using flagella. The bacteria can grow in a number of artificial nutrient environments, especially betaine- and arginine-containing ones.

In vitro, optimal proliferation temperature is reported around 40 °C in neutral or slightly acidic environments (pH 6.8–7.0). The majority of strains are capable of oxidation, not fermentation, of sugars without gas formation (most importantly, glucose and galactose; older cultures are reported to also metabolize maltose and starch). Bacteria produce both exo- and endotoxins. The role of the toxins identified in the process of melioidosis symptom development has not been fully elucidated.

== Identification ==
Burkholderia pseudomallei is not fastidious and grows on a large variety of culture media (blood agar, MacConkey agar, EMB, etc.). Ashdown's medium (or Burkholderia cepacia medium) may be used for selective isolation. Cultures typically become positive in 24 to 48 hours (this rapid growth rate differentiates the organism from B. mallei, which typically takes a minimum of 72 hours to grow). Colonies are wrinkled, have a metallic appearance, and possess an earthy odor. On Gram staining, the organism is a Gram-negative rod with a characteristic "safety pin" appearance (bipolar staining). On sensitivity testing, the organism appears highly resistant (it is innately resistant to many antibiotics including colistin and gentamicin) and that again differentiates it from B. mallei, which is in contrast, exquisitely sensitive to many antibiotics. For environmental specimens only, differentiation from the nonpathogenic B. thailandensis using an arabinose test is necessary (B. thailandensis is never isolated from clinical specimens). The laboratory identification of B. pseudomallei has been described in the literature.

The classic textbook description of B. pseudomallei in clinical samples is of an intracellular, bipolar-staining, Gram-negative rod, but this is of little value in identifying the organism from clinical samples. Some suggest the Wayson stain is useful for this purpose, but this has been shown not to be the case.

Laboratory identification of B. pseudomallei can be difficult, especially in Western countries where it is rarely seen. The large, wrinkled colonies look like environmental contaminants, so are often discarded as being of no clinical significance. Colony morphology is very variable and a single strain may display multiple colony types, so inexperienced laboratory staff may mistakenly believe the growth is not pure. The organism grows more slowly than other bacteria that may be present in clinical specimens, and in specimens from nonsterile sites, is easily overgrown. Nonsterile specimens should, therefore, be cultured in selective media (e.g., Ashdown's or B. cepacia medium). For heavily contaminated samples, such as feces, a modified version of Ashdown's that includes norfloxacin, amoxicillin, and polymyxin B has been proposed. In blood culture, the BacT/ALERT MB system (normally used for culturing mycobacteria) by bioMérieux has been shown to have superior yields compared to conventional blood culture media.

Even when the isolate is recognized to be significant, commonly used identification systems may misidentify the organism as Chromobacterium violaceum or other nonfermenting, Gram-negative bacilli such as Burkholderia cepacia or Pseudomonas aeruginosa. Again, because the disease is rarely seen in Western countries, identification of B. pseudomallei in cultures may not actually trigger alarms in physicians unfamiliar with the disease. Routine biochemical methods for identification of bacteria vary widely in their identification of this organism: the API 20NE system accurately identifies B. pseudomallei in 99% of cases, as does the automated Vitek 1 system, but the automated Vitek 2 system only identifies 19% of isolates.

The pattern of resistance to antimicrobials is distinctive, and helps to differentiate the organism from P. aeruginosa. The majority of B. pseudomallei isolates are intrinsically resistant to all aminoglycosides (via an efflux pump mechanism), but sensitive to co-amoxiclav: this pattern of resistance almost never occurs in P. aeruginosa and is helpful in identification. Unfortunately, the majority of strains in Sarawak, Borneo, are susceptible to aminoglycosides and macrolides, which means the conventional recommendations for isolation and identification do not apply there.

Molecular methods (PCR) of diagnosis are possible, but not routinely available for clinical diagnosis. Fluorescence in situ hybridisation has also been described, but has not been clinically validated, and it is not commercially available. In Thailand, a latex agglutination assay is widely used, while a rapid immunofluorescence technique is also available in a small number of centres.

== Characteristics ==
Morphological, physiological, and biochemical characteristics of Burkholderia pseudomallei are shown in the Table below.

Test type	Test	Characteristics
Colony characters	Size	2–5 μm in length and 0.4–0.8 μm in diameter
Colony characters	Type	Round
Colony characters	Color	Whitish
Colony characters	Shape	Multiple
Morphological characters	Shape	Rod (Variable)
Physiological characters	Motility	+
Physiological characters	Growth at 6.5% NaCl	+
Biochemical characters	Gram staining	-
Biochemical characters	Oxidase	+
Biochemical characters	Catalase	+
Biochemical characters	Oxidative-Fermentative	
Biochemical characters	Motility	+
Biochemical characters	Methyl Red	
Biochemical characters	Voges-Proskauer	
Biochemical characters	Indole	-
Biochemical characters	H_{2}S Production	-
Biochemical characters	Urease	
Biochemical characters	Nitrate reductase	+
Biochemical characters	β-Galactosidase	
Hydrolysis of	Gelatin	+
Hydrolysis of	Casein	
Utilization of	Glycerol	+
Utilization of	Galactose	+
Utilization of	D-Glucose	+
Utilization of	D-Fructose	+
Utilization of	D-Mannose	+
Utilization of	Mannitol	Variable

Note: + = Positive, – =Negative

== Disinfection ==
Burkholderia pseudomallei is susceptible to numerous disinfectants, including benzalkonium chloride, iodine, mercuric chloride, potassium permanganate, 1% sodium hypochlorite, 70% ethanol, 2% glutaraldehyde, and to a lesser extent, phenolic preparations. B. pseudomallei is effectively killed by the commercial disinfectants, Perasafe and Virkon. The microorganism can also be destroyed by heating to above 74 °C for 10 min or by ultraviolet irradiation.

== Medical importance ==
Burkholderia pseudomallei infection in humans is called melioidosis or Whitmore's disease. It is spread though direct contact with water or soil that holds the bacteria. There have been few cases of transmission of the bacteria perinatally. Its mortality is 20 to 50% even with treatment.

== Antibiotic treatment and sensitivity testing ==
The antibiotic of choice is ceftazidime. While various antibiotics are active in vitro (e.g., chloramphenicol, doxycycline, co-trimoxazole), they have been proven to be inferior in vivo for the treatment of acute melioidosis. Disc diffusion tests are unreliable when looking for co-trimoxazole resistance in B. pseudomallei (they greatly overestimate resistance) and Etests or agar dilution tests should be used in preference. The actions of co-trimoxazole and doxycycline are antagonistic, which suggests these two drugs ought not to be used together.

The organism is intrinsically resistant to gentamicin and colistin, and this fact is helpful in the identification of the organism. Kanamycin is used to kill B. pseudomallei in the laboratory, but the concentrations used are much higher than those achievable in humans.

== Pathogenicity mechanisms and virulence factors ==
Burkholderia pseudomallei is an opportunistic pathogen and, since its an environmental organism, has no requirement to pass through an animal host to replicate. From the point of view of the bacterium, human infection is a developmental "dead end".

Strains which cause disease in humans differ from those causing disease in other animals, by possessing certain genomic islands. It may have the ability to cause disease in humans via DNA acquired from other microorganisms. Its mutation rate is also high, and the organism continues to evolve even after infecting a host.

Burkholderia pseudomallei is able to invade cells - being an intracellular pathogen. It is able to polymerise actin, and to spread from cell to cell, causing cell fusion and the formation of multinucleated giant cells. It possesses a uniquely fusogenic type VI secretion system that is required for cell-cell spread and virulence in mammalian hosts. The bacterium also expresses a toxin called lethal factor 1. B. pseudomallei is one of the first Proteobacteria to be identified as containing an active type VI secretion system. It is also the only organism identified that contains up to six different type VI secretion systems.

B. pseudomallei is intrinsically resistant to many antimicrobial agents by virtue of its efflux pump mechanism. This mediates resistance to aminoglycosides (AmrAB-OprA), tetracyclines, fluoroquinolones, and macrolides (BpeAB-OprB).

== Vaccine candidates ==
As of 2023 no vaccine had been licensed, although many had been evaluated in pre-clinical studies.

Vaccine candidates have been suggested. Aspartate-β-semialdehyde dehydrogenase (asd) gene deletion mutants are auxotrophic for diaminopimelate (DAP) in rich media and auxotrophic for DAP, lysine, methionine and threonine in minimal media. The Δasd bacterium (bacterium with the asd gene removed) protects against inhalational melioidosis in mice.

== Transformation ==
Burkholderia pseudomoallei can go through transformation. The bacteria is able to uptake a free plasmid using electroporation and the plasmid material will integrate into the host DNA when they are electrocompetent.
