= RsmW sRNA =

Type of RNA molecule not translated into a protein

- Predicted secondary structure and sequence conservation of RsmW small RNA

Identifiers
- Rfam: RF02809

Other data
- Domain: Bacteria
- GO: GO:0071978
- SO: SO:0000370
- PDB structures: PDBe

RsmW is a part of the Rsm/Csr family of non-coding RNAs (ncRNAs) discovered in Pseudomonas aeruginosa. It specifically binds to RsmA protein in vitro, restores biofilm production (possibly due to the interaction with RsmA) and partially complements the loss of RsmY and RsmZ in rsmY/rsmZ double mutant in regards to their contribution to swarming. Compared to RsmY and RsmZ its production is induced in high temperatures and rsmW is not transcriptionally activated by GacA.

== See also ==
- CsrB/RsmB RNA family
- CsrC RNA family
- PrrB/RsmZ RNA family
- RsmY RNA family
- RsmX
- CsrA protein
