= Ambifaria =

Ambifaria may refer to:

- Burkholderia ambifaria, species of Pseudomonadota
- Lepidogma ambifaria, species of snout moth
