= Aerobic denitrification =

Co-respiration using both oxygen and nitrate as electron acceptor

Aerobic denitrification, or co-respiration, the simultaneous use of both oxygen (O_{2}) and nitrate (NO^{−}_{3}) as oxidizing agents, performed by various genera of microorganisms. This process differs from anaerobic denitrification not only in its insensitivity to the presence of oxygen, but also in its higher potential to form nitrous oxide (N_{2}O) as a byproduct.

Nitrate, acting as an oxidant, is therefore reduced in a succession of four reactions performed by the enzymes nitrate, nitrite, nitric-oxide, and nitrous oxide reductases. The pathway ultimately yields reduced molecular nitrogen (N_{2}), as well as, when the reaction does not reach completion, the intermediate species nitrous oxide (N_{2}O).

A simple denitrification reaction schematically proceeds as follows:

NO_{3}^{−} → NO_{2}^{−} → NO → N_{2}O → N_{2} (g)

The respiration reaction which utilizes oxygen as oxidant to produce energy from glucose is the following:

C_{6}H_{12}O_{6} (aq) + 6 O_{2} (g) → 6 CO_{2} (g) + 6 H_{2}O

Classically, it was thought that denitrification would not occur in the presence of oxygen since there seems to be no energetic advantage to using nitrate as an oxidant when oxygen is available. Experiments have since proven that denitrifiers are often facultative anaerobes and that aerobic denitrification does indeed occur in a broad range of microbial organisms with varying levels of productivity, usually lower productivity than results from purely aerobic respiration. The advantages of being able to perform denitrification in the presence of oxygen are uncertain, though it is possible that the ability to adapt to changes in oxygen levels plays a role. Aerobic denitrification may be found in environments where fluctuating oxygen concentrations and reduced carbon are available. The relative harsh environment inspires the potential of denitrifiers to degrade toxic nitrate or nitrite under an aerobic atmosphere. Aerobic denitrifiers tend to work efficiently at 25 ~ 37 °C and pH 7 ~ 8, when dissolved oxygen concentration is 3 ~ 5 mg/L and C/N load ratio is 5 ~ 10.

== Environmental impact ==
=== Wastewater treatment ===
Water treatment often relies on the activity of anaerobically denitrifying bacteria in order to remove nitrate from water. However, due to the absence of oxygen, nitrate cannot be fully reduced to dinitrogen, thus nitrate remains in the water or it is converted to nitrous oxide. Lingering nitrate in drinking water poses a plethora of health risks, and both nitrate and nitrous oxide have major environmental impacts. Some hazards include, carcinogenic nitrite ions in drinking water, or eutrophication caused by oxidized nitrogen seeding algal blooms. Conversely aerobic denitrification can further reduce oxidized nitrogen in a less specialized environment. For instance, many aerobically denitrifying bacteria from the genus Pseudomonas (P. stutzeri, P. mendocina and P. putida) were shown to be isolated from the Lingshui River in China, and could be further used in bioaugmentation to clear contaminated water. In addition to Pseudomonas, Acinetobacter sp. SYF26 was isolated from the Heihe reservoir in China. Genomic analysis revealed a napA gene encoding a periplasmic nitrate reductase, and a nirK and nirS for gene for the nitrite reductase (both enzymes needed in aerobic nitrate denitrification).

==== Global warming ====
Nitrous oxide is a 200-300 times more potent greenhouse gas than carbon dioxide, accounting for 5% of the global green house gas effect. During the reduction of nitrate in wastewater treatment, nitrous oxide is only released in the absence of appropriate oxygen regulation. Some solutions to combat the release of nitrous oxide from wastewater treatment could be to use aerobically denitrifying organisms with the capacity to fully reduce nitrogen. For instance, P. denitrificans has shown to efficiently reduce nitrate to N_{2} in cultured media and wastewater. Furthermore, TR2 strains of P. sturzeri and Pseudomonas sp. strain K50 were also shown to have substantially low levels of nitrous oxide production in water treatment. Thus enriching activated sludge for aerobic denitrifying bacteria can be effective in combating the global warming effects of nitrous oxide in wastewater treatment.

== See also ==
- Denitrification
- Cellular respiration
- Nitrogen cycle
- Nitrogen fixation
