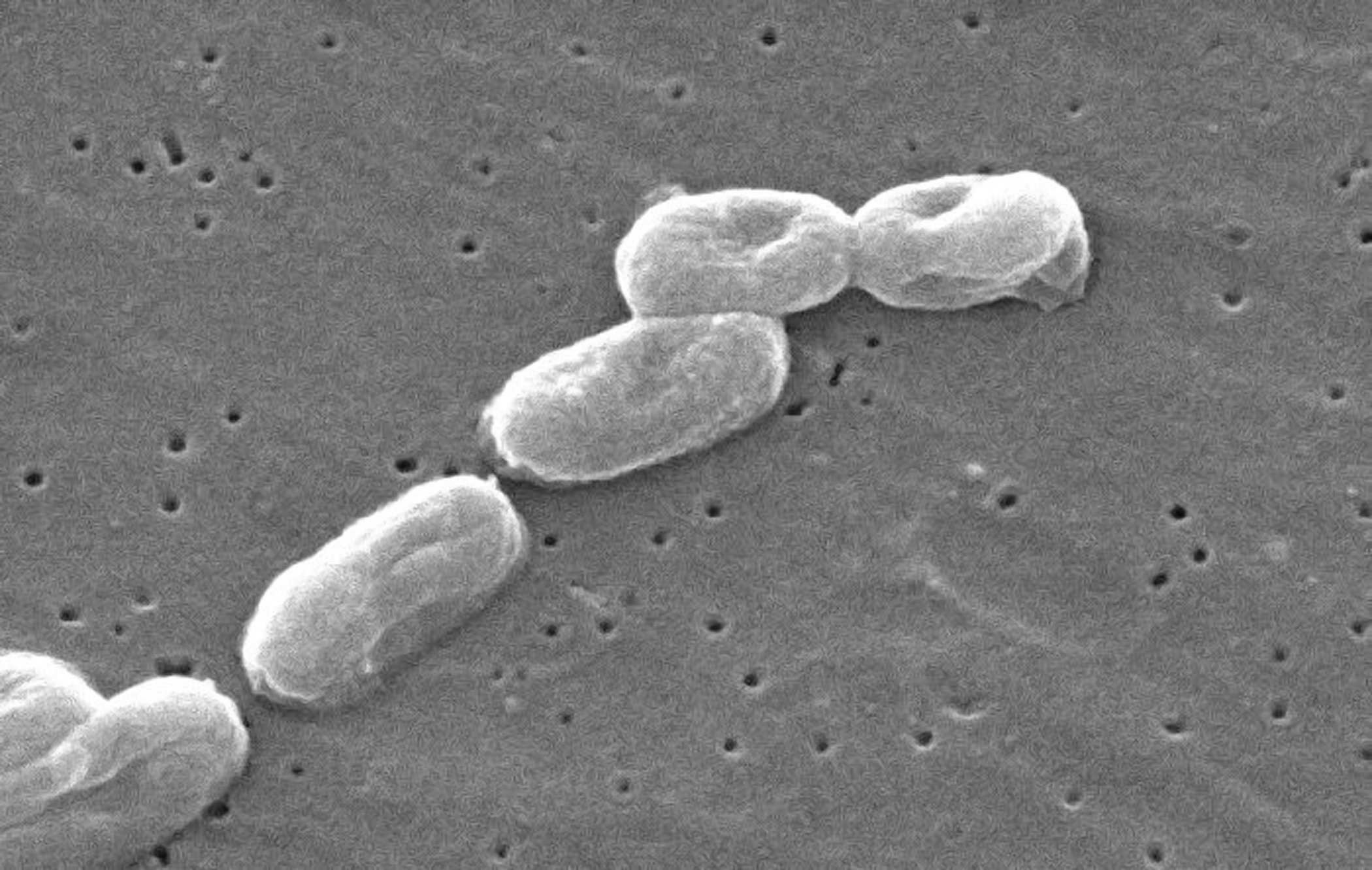
- Electron micrograph of Burkholderia cepacia

Scientific classification
- Domain: Bacteria
- Kingdom: Pseudomonadati
- Phylum: Pseudomonadota
- Class: Betaproteobacteria
- Order: Burkholderiales
- Family: Burkholderiaceae
- Genus: Burkholderia
- Species: B. cenocepacia

Binomial name
- Burkholderia cenocepacia Vandamme et al. 2003

= Burkholderia cenocepacia =

Species of bacterium

Burkholderia cenocepacia is a Gram-negative, rod-shaped bacterium that is commonly found in soil and water environments and may also be associated with plants and animals, particularly as a human pathogen. It is one of over 20 species in the Burkholderia cepacia complex (Bcc) and is notable due to its virulence factors and inherent antibiotic resistance that render it a prominent opportunistic pathogen responsible for life-threatening, nosocomial infections in immunocompromised patients, such as those with cystic fibrosis or chronic granulomatous disease. The quorum sensing systems CepIR and CciIR regulate the formation of biofilms and the expression of virulence factors such as siderophores and proteases. Burkholderia cenocepacia may also cause disease in plants, such as in onions and bananas. Additionally, some strains serve as plant growth-promoting rhizobacteria.

== Taxonomy ==
Within the Burkholderia genus, the Burkholderia cepacia complex contains over 20 related species that cause opportunistic infections and possess antibiotic resistance. Burkholderia cepacia was originally defined as a single species, but it is now one of several species in the Bcc. Although closely related, the species within the Bcc have differing severity of pathogenicity, and B. cenocepacia is one of the most intensively studied due to its higher pathogenicity and antibiotic resistance compared to other species in the complex. Exchange of genetic material between species of the Bcc has resulted in a reticulated phylogeny that presents an obstacle to diagnostic classification at the species-level. Because of this phenotypic overlap between species, previous nomenclature of Bcc species involved genomovar terms, with Burkholderia cenocepacia categorized as genomovar III of the Bcc. Within the categorization as genomovar III, there are 4 phylogenetic lineage groups: IIIA, IIIB, IIIC, and IIID. No IIIC isolates have been found in studies on the natural environment, whereas all IIID isolates studied have been in clinical isolates of B. cenocepacia.

== Microbiology ==
The strong environmental protection response of B. cenocepacia is attributed to the biofilm formed by groups of the organism. This biofilm contains exopolysaccharides that strengthen the bacterium's resistance to antibiotics and contribute to the bacteria's virulence. It is made up of a highly branched polysaccharide unit with one glucose, one glucuronic acid, one mannose, one rhamnose, and three galactose molecules. This species in the Burkholderia cepacia complex has also created another polysaccharide with one 3-deoxy-d-manno-2-octulosonic acid and three galactose molecules. The biofilm exopolysaccharides act as a barrier to neutrophils from human immune resistance systems, undermining the neutrophil defense action by inhibiting neutrophil chemotaxis and scavenging reactive oxygen species, which are bactericidal products produced by neutrophils to destroy bacteria.

=== Genome ===
B. cenocepacia's genome consists of three circular chromosomes and one plasmid. Chromosome 1 contains 3.87 Mb, chromosome 2 contains 3.22 Mb, and chromosome 3 contains 0.88 Mb. The plasmid is approximately 0.09 Mb. Chromosome 3 has also been characterized as a large plasmid, or megaplasmid (pC3); unlike chromosomes 2 and 3, it does not contain essential housekeeping genes, instead coding for accessory functions such as virulence and resistance to stress. In addition to the multireplicon structure, the genome contains several insertion sequences and can rapidly mutate during infections, which contribute to B. cenocepacia's unique adaptability and ability to acquire diverse catabolic functions.

=== Environments ===
Burkholderia cenocepacia has been found to thrive in primarily microaerophilic conditions, which consist of little to no oxygen. Experimental studies conducted on the growth of B. cenocepacia in environments akin to the human lungs demonstrated the pathogen's increased success in microaerophilic environments over aerophilic settings. In environments with little available iron such as the lungs of a cystic fibrosis patient, Burkholderia cenocepacia secretes siderophores, molecules that bind to iron and transport them to the bacteria. Out of the four types of siderophores produced by the Bcc, B. cenocepacia produces three: ornibactin, pyochelin, and salicylic acid (SA). Ornibactin is the most important iron uptake system and can sustain the bacteria in an iron-deficient environment even without the production of functioning pyochelin or SA.

B. cenocepacia has been demonstrated to colonize an array of ecological niches with diverse lifestyles. The ability to utilize a wide range of carbon sources accompanies the ability of Bcc species to be efficient with plant-growth promotion, bioremediation, and biocontrol. High potential of Bcc species, including B. cenocepacia, as a biocontrol of plant-growth promoting agents has been demonstrated; however, the mechanisms that support this are not known. In a bioremediation context, various Bcc strains are suggested to hold high potential to remediate environments contaminated with toxic compounds, including halogenated compounds.

In addition, B. cenocepacia has been found to exist in the rhizosphere, plants, soil, water, and animals. In fact, it was found to have an endophytic lifestyle when recovered from plant material, indicating that it has endosymbiotic characteristics. Burkholderia cenocepacia was the dominant genomovar recovered in a study of bacteria in the rhizosphere of maize in China, pointing to endosymbiotic attributes with plants in soil. However, B. cenocepacia also demonstrated phytopathogenic properties in causing fingertip rot in bananas.

=== Quorum sensing ===
One kind of cell-to-cell communication employed by B. cenocepacia is quorum sensing, which is the detection of fluctuations in cell density and usage of this information to regulate functions such as the formation of biofilms. Like other Gram-negative bacteria, B. cenocepacia produces acyl-homoserine lactones (AHLs), signaling molecules that in members of the Burkholderia cepacia complex specifically are encoded by two systems–the CepIR system, which is highly conserved in the Bcc, and the CciIR system. The two AHL-mediated QS systems, CepIR and CciIR, regulate each other; the CepR protein is required for the transcription of the cciIR operon, while the CciR protein represses transcription of cepI. The CciIR system can also negatively regulate the CepIR system through the production of C6-HSL, a type of AHL produced primarily by CciI proteins that inhibits the activity of CepR proteins. The bacterium also uses cis-2-dodecenoic acid signals, which are known as Burkholderia diffusible signal factors (BDSF) because they were first identified in Burkholderia cenocepacia.

=== Motility ===
Burkholderia cenocepacia has the ability to swim and swarm inside the body. It has a polar flagella and produces a surfactant. These characteristics are necessary for the species to have motility in an agar medium. The surfactant produced by Burkholderia cenocepacia allows other pathogenic bacteria in the lungs to have motility. This means that the presence of Burkholderia cenocepacia is necessary for swarms of bacteria to coexist and cooperate in the lungs.

== Pathogenicity ==
Burkholderia cenocepacia is an opportunistic pathogen that commonly infects immunocompromised patients, especially those with cystic fibrosis, and is often lethal. In cystic fibrosis, it can cause "cepacia syndrome," which is characterized by a rapidly progressive fever, uncontrolled bronchopneumonia, weight loss, and in some cases, death. A review of B. cenocepacia in respiratory infections of cystic fibrosis patients stated that "one of the most threatening pathogens in [cystic fibrosis] is Burkholderia cenocepacia, a member of a bacterial group collectively referred to as the Burkholderia cepacia complex." Twenty-four small RNAs were identified using RNA-binding properties of the Hfq protein during the exponential growth phases. sRNAs identified in Burkholderia cenocepacia KC-0 were upregulated under iron depletion and oxidative stress. Burkholderia cenocepacia encodes two RNA chaperone proteins that assist sRNAs in binding to mRNA, Hfq and Hfq2. Both are required for maximum virulence and resistance against stressors such as acidic pH, high temperatures, osmotic stress, and oxidative stress. Burkholderia cenocepacia produces a toxin called double-stranded DNA deaminase A (DddA) made by the bacterium that converts DNA base cytosine to uracil. Because uracil, which is not commonly found in DNA, behaves like a thymidine, the enzymes that replicate the cell’s DNA copy it as a thymidine, effectively converting a cytosine in the genome sequence to a thymidine. This has reportedly been used for the first gene-editing of mitochondria – for which a team at the Broad Institute developed a new kind of CRISPR-free base editor, called DdCBE, using the toxin.

See also: Burkholderia thailandensis sRNA

=== Antibiotic resistance ===
The structural factors that contribute to the antibiotic resistance of B. cenocepacia include: an impermeable outer membrane, an efflux pump mechanism, and the production of a beta-lactamase. This microbe challenges infection prevention as it is resistant to some disinfectants and antiseptics. It can survive on surfaces, including human skin and mucosal surfaces for an extended period of time.

=== Virulence ===
Virulence in Burkholderia cenocepacia is widely attributed to biofilm formation, siderophore production, and QS signaling - each of which affect how the species adapts in various environmental conditions. B. cenocepacia's ability to adapt to host environments contributes to chronic opportunistic infections and bacterial persistence. Several strains are noted as "epidemic strains" due to increased transmission capability and patient-to-patient transmission. The ET12 strain was found to have a "cable pilus," which enables greater adhesion of bacteria to epithelial cells.

In human airway epithelial cells, the invasion pathway utilized by the BC-7 strain of B. cenocepacia is largely the result of the strain's biofilm formation. In general, both environmental and clinical strains of B. cenocepacia are able to form biofilms; however, the ability to do so is greater in clinical strains. The H111 strain of Burkholderia cenocepacia forms biofilms on pea roots, for example. Quorum signaling (QS) affects the ability of B. cenocepacia to develop biofilms, in addition to the motility abilities. In addition, quorum signaling controls a variety of cellular processes, such as extracellular proteases, polygalacturonase, and the production of siderophores.

== Cystic fibrosis ==
Burkholderia cenocepacia is one of over twenty bacteria in the Burkholderia cepacia complex (Bcc), and among these species, it is a dominant bacteria associated with cystic fibrosis. B. cenocepacia has such high transmissibility that it has spread across continents, including Europe and Canada, between cystic fibrosis patients at epidemic levels. Patients with cystic fibrosis are threatened most by opportunistic pathogens. Based on the distribution of Bcc species in sample cystic fibrosis patient populations, B. cenocepacia claims between 45.6% and 91.8% of all infections caused by the Bcc complex. Compared to other infectious agents found in cystic fibrosis patients, the Bcc complex demonstrates the greatest association with increased morbidity and mortality. Compared to other species in the Bcc complex, B. cenocepacia was shown to possibly accelerate BMI decline and FEV_{1} (forced expiration) at the greatest rate, leading to worse prognoses for cystic fibrosis patients. The Bcc complex consists of genomovars, which are species characterized to be phylogenetically close, though distinct from each other. In cystic fibrosis infections, it is common for only one of the known nine genomovars to induce an infection. Overall, in patients with cystic fibrosis, the genomovar status of the Bcc has a significant influence on the success of clinical interventions, as well as the temporal progression of the condition.

== Applications ==
=== Biotechnology ===
Given the opportunistic nature of the Bcc complex and B. cenocepacia, the severity of respiratory infections is considered to be a significant conflict for applications in biotechnology.

=== Agriculture ===
To increase soil health, plant-growth promoting rhizobacteria (PGPR) are used in the agricultural industry to create bio-organic fertilizers. A current challenge is identifying which bacterial species are optimal at stimulating plant growth in bio-organic fertilizers. Creating bio-organic fertilizers has been increasingly successful with the use of plant-growth promoting rhizobacteria mixed with organic substrates. B. cenocepacia has various PGPR traits like phosphate solubilization that make it well-suited to promote growth. With the addition of solid-state fermentation technology, creating bio-organic fertilizers was highly successful by incorporating B. cenocepacia with high protein content agricultural wastes.
