= MAEB RNA motif =

The MAEB RNA motif (Metabolism-Associated Element in Burkholderia RNA motif) is a conserved stem-loop RNA structure present in many species in the genus Burkholderia. MAEB stem-loops typically occur in blocks of repeats, usually with 2–6 consecutive instances of MAEB stem-loops separated by a short and conserved linker sequence. As many as 12 consecutive MAEB stem-loops have been observed in a single block.

Most MAEB blocks are positioned in the presumed 5' UTR of downstream genes. Out of 141 blocks of consecutive MAEB stem-loops, 132 are positioned in a possible 5' UTR. Therefore, MAEB stem-loops are likely to correspond to a cis-regulatory element. It was observed that the genes apparently regulated by MAEB generally have a role in primary metabolism, i.e., the synthesis, catabolism or transport of small molecules; few MAEB-associated genes are involved in other functions, such as signal transduction, motility or replication. Thus, the motif is associated with a metabolic role, and indeed a weak association with the glycine cleavage system was observed.

Three hypotheses for the biological role of MAEB were considered. One is that the MAEB stem-loop is really a DNA-binding domain of a dimeric protein, and that the two subunits of this protein bind on opposite strands of the duplex DNA. However, two nucleotides at complementary positions on the 5' and 3' side of the stem are almost always purines. If the MAEB motif is really a short DNA-binding domain and its reverse complement, then the 3' part of the apparent RNA stem at this position should contain the complementary pyrimidine, and not also be a purine. Therefore, this hypothesis is unlikely to be true.

The second hypothesis considered is that MAEB is a repetitive DNA sequence. Although the repetitive nature of MAEB stem-loops supports this kind of a role, the association of MAEB with metabolic genes is inconsistent with known repetitive elements, which are typically the result of selfish replication or errors in replication. Rather the repetitive nature of MAEB stem-loops probably has a functional role for the cell.

The third hypothesis advanced is that MAEB stem-loops bind a protein, and the multiple occurrences of MAEB stem-loops within a single RNA molecule would allow the binding of more proteins per RNA molecule. Such an arrangement is similar to CsrB RNA, which contains roughly 18 hairpins, each of which binds one CsrA protein subunit. The true function of MAEB stem-loops remain unknown.
