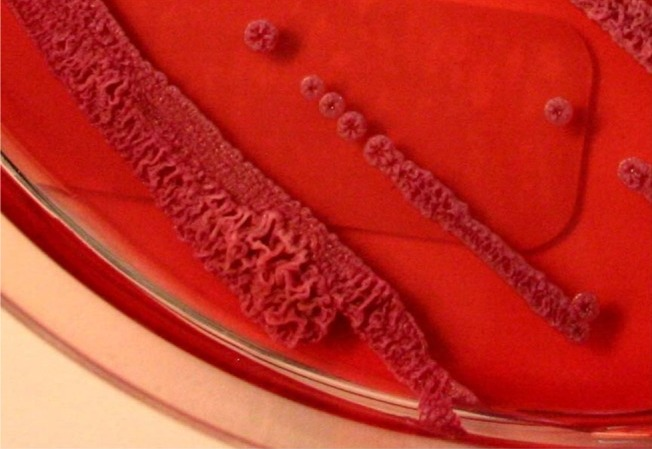
- Burkholderia humptydooensis grown on Ashdown's agar

Scientific classification
- Domain: Bacteria
- Kingdom: Pseudomonadati
- Phylum: Pseudomonadota
- Class: Betaproteobacteria
- Order: Burkholderiales
- Family: Burkholderiaceae
- Genus: Burkholderia
- Species: B. humptydooensis

Binomial name
- Burkholderia humptydooensis Tuanyok et al. 2017

= Burkholderia humptydooensis =

Species of bacterium

Burkholderia humptydooensis is a gram-negative bacterium isolated from bore water in Australia's Northern Territory during routine screening for B. pseudomallei. Although it exhibits similarities in form and biochemical properties to B. pseudomallei and B. thailandensis, molecular analyses confirmed it as a distinct species within the B. pseudomallei complex.

The bacteria is named for Humpty Doo, Australia.
