= Novalis (disambiguation) =

Novalis is the pseudonym of Georg Philipp Friedrich Freiherr von Hardenberg.

Novalis may also refer to:

- Novalis (band), a 1970s Krautrock group formed in Germany. Their best-known albums include Sommerabend and Wer Schmetterlinge lachen hört
- 8052 Novalis
- Lorien Novalis School, a Steiner School in Dural, New South Wales, Australia. Established in 1971, the school teaches from classes Preschool to Year 12
- Novalis radiosurgery
- Ulotrichodes novalis
- Limnaecia novalis, a moth of the family Cosmopterigidae, from Australia
- Novalis, a Canadian publisher currently owned by Bayard Presse.
