= Burkholderia seminalis =

Scientific classification
- Domain: Bacteria
- Kingdom: Pseudomonadati
- Phylum: Pseudomonadota
- Class: Betaproteobacteria
- Order: Burkholderiales
- Family: Burkholderiaceae
- Genus: Burkholderia
- Species: B. seminalis

Binomial name
- Burkholderia seminalis Vanlaere et al. 2008

Type strain
- AU0475, CCUG 54564, LMG 24067, R-24196, strain AU0475, Vanlaere R-24196

Species of bacterium

Burkholderia seminalis is a gram-negative, aerobic, non-spore-forming, bacterium from the genus Burkholderia and the family Burkholderiaceae which belongs to the Burkholderia cepacia complex.
