= Burkholderia stagnalis =

Scientific classification
- Domain: Bacteria
- Kingdom: Pseudomonadati
- Phylum: Pseudomonadota
- Class: Betaproteobacteria
- Order: Burkholderiales
- Family: Burkholderiaceae
- Genus: Burkholderia
- Species: B. stagnalis

Binomial name
- Burkholderia stagnalis De Smet et al. 2015

Type strain
- Bp6893, Bp6916, Bp7118, Bp7119, Bp7120

Species of bacterium

Burkholderia stagnalis is a gram-negative bacterium from the genus of Burkholderia. Burkholderia stagnalis belongs to the Burkholderia cepacia complex.
