= Burkholderia contaminans =

Scientific classification
- Domain: Bacteria
- Kingdom: Pseudomonadati
- Phylum: Pseudomonadota
- Class: Betaproteobacteria
- Order: Burkholderiales
- Family: Burkholderiaceae
- Genus: Burkholderia
- Species: B. contaminans

Binomial name
- Burkholderia contaminans Vanlaere et al. 2009

Type strain
- CCUG 55526, Govan J2956, J2956, LMG 23361, R-12710, R-12710 t1, sheep1, Vandamme R-12710t1

Species of bacterium

Burkholderia contaminans is a gram-negative, bacterium from the genus of Burkholderia and the family of Burkholderiaceae and belongs to the Burkholderia cepacia complex, which was isolated from cystic fibrosis patients in Argentina. Burkholderia acidipaludis can cause biliary sepsis.
