= Burkholderia territorii =

Scientific classification
- Domain: Bacteria
- Kingdom: Pseudomonadati
- Phylum: Pseudomonadota
- Class: Betaproteobacteria
- Order: Burkholderiales
- Family: Burkholderiaceae
- Genus: Burkholderia
- Species: B. territorii

Binomial name
- Burkholderia territorii De Smet et al. 2015

Synonyms
- BP7066, Bp0350, Bp0363, Bp0379, Bp0450

Species of bacterium

Burkholderia territorii is a gram-negative bacterium from the genus of Burkholderia. Burkholderia territorii belongs to the Burkholderia cepacia complex.
