= Burkholderia diffusa =

Scientific classification
- Domain: Bacteria
- Kingdom: Pseudomonadati
- Phylum: Pseudomonadota
- Class: Betaproteobacteria
- Order: Burkholderiales
- Family: Burkholderiaceae
- Genus: Burkholderia
- Species: B. diffusa

Binomial name
- Burkholderia diffusa Vanlaere et al. 2008

Type strain
- AU1075, CCUG 54558, LMG 24065

Species of bacterium

Burkholderia diffusa is a gram-negative, aerobic, non-spore-forming bacterium from the genus of Burkholderia and the family of Burkholderiaceae which belongs to the Burkholderia cepacia complex.
