= Burkholderia lata =

Scientific classification
- Domain: Bacteria
- Kingdom: Pseudomonadati
- Phylum: Pseudomonadota
- Class: Betaproteobacteria
- Order: Burkholderiales
- Family: Burkholderiaceae
- Genus: Burkholderia
- Species: B. lata

Binomial name
- Burkholderia lata Vanlaere et al. 2009

Type strain
- ATCC 17760, CCUG 2856, CCUG 55525, Coenye R-18194, Hayward 61, LMG 22485, LMG 6991, NCIB 9086, NCIMB 9086, R-18194, Sneath D336, SneathD336, Stanier 383, strain FC655

Synonyms
- Burkholderia mana

Species of bacterium

Burkholderia lata is a gram-negative bacterium from the genus of Burkholderia and the family of Burkholderiaceae which belongs to the Burkholderia cepacia complex.
