= Nitric-oxide reductase =

nitric oxide reductase

Identifiers
- EC no.: 1.7.2.5
- CAS no.: 37256-43-2

Databases
- IntEnz: IntEnz view
- BRENDA: BRENDA entry
- ExPASy: NiceZyme view
- KEGG: KEGG entry
- MetaCyc: metabolic pathway
- PRIAM: profile
- PDB structures: RCSB PDB PDBe PDBsum
- Gene Ontology: AmiGO / QuickGO
Search
- PMC: articles
- PubMed: articles
- NCBI: proteins

Nitric oxide reductase, an enzyme, catalyzes the reduction of nitric oxide (NO) to nitrous oxide (N_{2}O). The enzyme participates in nitrogen metabolism and in the microbial defense against nitric oxide toxicity. The catalyzed reaction may be dependent on different participating small molecules: Cytochrome c (EC: 1.7.2.5, Nitric oxide reductase (cytochrome c)), NADPH (EC:1.7.1.14), or Menaquinone (EC:1.7.5.2).

== Nomenclature ==
Nitric oxide reductase was assigned Enzyme Commission number (EC) 1.7.2.5. Enzyme Commission numbers are the standard naming system used for enzymes. The EC identifies the class, subclass, sub-subclass, and serial number of the enzyme. Nitric oxide reductase is in Class 1, therefore it is an oxidoreductases.

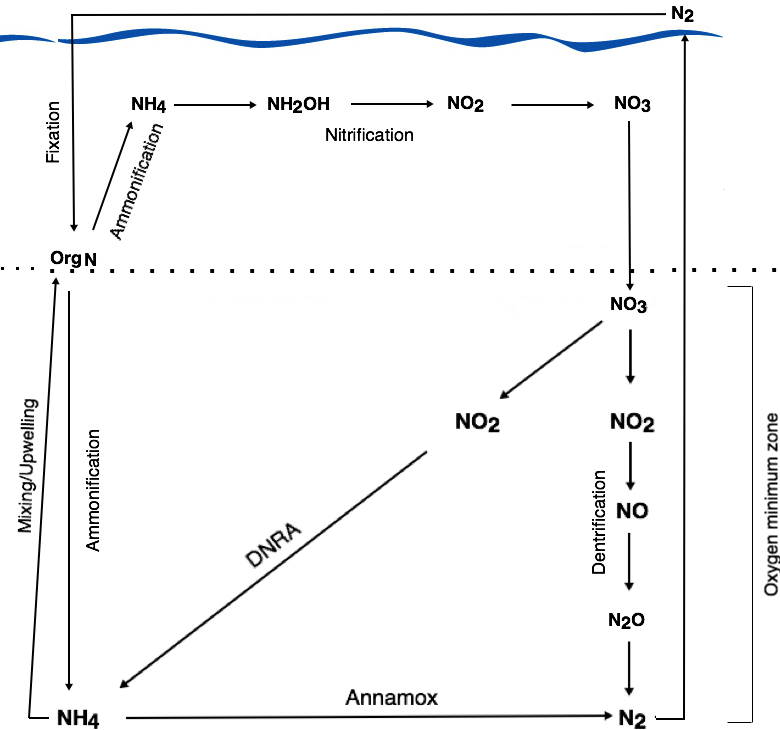
Figure 1. The Nitrogen Cycle. Nitric oxide (NO) and nitrous oxide (N_{2}O) are intermediates in the denitrification of nitrate (NO_{3}^{−}) to nitrogen gas (N_{2}). Nitric oxide reductase reduces NO to N_{2}O.

Nitric oxide reductase belongs to the family of oxidoreductases, specifically those acting on other nitrogenous compounds as donors with other acceptors. The systematic name of this enzyme class is nitrous-oxide:acceptor oxidoreductase (NO-forming). Other names in common use include nitrogen oxide reductase, and nitrous-oxide:(acceptor) oxidoreductase (NO-forming).

== Function ==
Organisms reduce nitrate (NO_{3}^{−}) to nitrogen gas (N_{2}) through the process of denitrification, see Figure 1. Two important intermediates of the reduction pathway are nitric oxide (NO) and nitrous oxide (N_{2}O). The reducing reaction that transforms NO into N_{2}O is catalyzed by nitric oxide reductase (NOR).

NO is reduced to N_{2}O also to prevent cellular toxicity. N_{2}O, a potent greenhouse gas, is released.

== Reaction ==
In enzymology, a nitric oxide reductase (NOR) catalyzes the chemical reaction:

2 NO + 2 e^{−} + 2 H^{+} $\rightleftharpoons$ N_{2}O + H_{2}O

The enzyme acts on 2 nitric oxide (substrate). The enzyme converts NO, electrons and protons to products: nitrous oxide, and H_{2}O.

Inputs: 2 molecules of NO, 2 electrons, 2 protons

Outputs: 1 molecule of N_{2}O, 1 molecule of H_{2}O

== Mechanism ==
NOR catalyzes the formation of nitrogen to nitrogen (N--N) bonding. The conformation changes of the active site and attached ligands (ie. Glu211) allows NO to be positioned in the crowded binuclear center and form N--N bonds.

The precise mechanism of catalysis is still unknown, although hypotheses have been proposed.

Cordas et al. 2013 proposes three options: the trans-mechanism, the cis-FeB and the cis-heme b3 mechanisms.

Based on the structure of the enzyme, Shiro 2012 proposes the following mechanism: (1) NO molecules bind at the binuclear center, (2) electrons are transferred from the ferrous irons to the NO, (3) charged NO molecules have the potential to form N to N bonds, and (4) N to O bonds are potentially broken by water, allowing for the N_{2}O and H_{2}O to be released.

According to Hino et al. 2010, the changing charge of the active site causes NO to bind, form N_{2}O and leave the enzyme. The NOR active site is positioned near two hydrogen bound glutamic acids (Glu). The Glu groups provide an electron-negative charge to the active site. The electro-negative charge reduces the reaction potential for heme b3 and allows NO to bind to the binuclear activation site. Glu residues also provide protons needed for removal of N_{2}O and production of H_{2}O.

== Structure ==
=== Subunits ===
NOR is made up of two subunits, NorC (small) and NorB (large), with a binuclear iron centre. The binuclear iron center is the active site. It is composed of two b-type hemes and a non-heme iron (FeB). The ligands are connected through a μ-oxo bridge. Histidine (His) residues are attached to the heme b3 in the small subunit. The hydrophilic region of the larger subunit has His and methionine (Met) ligands. Structure is similar to cytochrome oxidases.

The active site is conserved between cNOR and qNOR, although differences (ie. heme type) occur between cNOR and qNOR.

=== Folding ===
Enzymatic folding produced 13 alpha-helices (12 from NorB, 1 from NorC) located within and through the membrane. The folded metalloenzyme transverses the membrane.

== Species distribution ==
Bacteria, archaea and fungi use NOR. qNOR is found in denitrifying bacteria and archaea, as well as pathogenic bacteria not involved in denitrification. Denitrifying fungi reduce NO using P-450nor soluble enzyme.

== Types ==
Three types of NOR were identified from bacteria: cNOR, qNOR, and qCuNOR. cNOR was found in denitrifying bacteria: Paracoccus denitrificans, Halomonas halodenitrificans, Pseudomonas nautica, Pseudomonas stutzeri, and Pseudomonas aeruginosa. cNOR was first isolated from P. aeruginosa. qNOR was isolated from Geobacillus stearothermophilus.
