= Burkholderia metallica =

Scientific classification
- Domain: Bacteria
- Kingdom: Pseudomonadati
- Phylum: Pseudomonadota
- Class: Betaproteobacteria
- Order: Burkholderiales
- Family: Burkholderiaceae
- Genus: Burkholderia
- Species: B. metallica

Binomial name
- Burkholderia metallica Vanlaere et al. 2008

Type strain
- AU0553, CCUG 54567, LMG 24068, R-16017, strain AU0553, Vanlaere R-16017

Species of bacterium

Burkholderia metallica is a gram-negative bacterium from the genus of Burkholderia and the family of Burkholderiaceae which belongs to the Burkholderia cepacia complex.
