= Burkholderia latens =

Scientific classification
- Domain: Bacteria
- Kingdom: Pseudomonadati
- Phylum: Pseudomonadota
- Class: Betaproteobacteria
- Order: Burkholderiales
- Family: Burkholderiaceae
- Genus: Burkholderia
- Species: B. latens

Binomial name
- Burkholderia latens Vanlaere et al. 2008

Type strain
- CCUG 54555, FIRENZE 3, LMG 24064, R-5630, strain FIRENZE 3, Vanlaere R-5630

Species of bacterium

Burkholderia latens is a gram-negative, aerobic, non-spore-forming bacterium from the genus of Burkholderia and the family of Burkholderiaceae which belongs to the Burkholderia cepacia complex. Colonies of Burkholderia latens are moist.
