= Lepidogma latifasciata =

Scientific classification
- Domain: Eukaryota
- Kingdom: Animalia
- Phylum: Arthropoda
- Class: Insecta
- Order: Lepidoptera
- Family: Pyralidae
- Genus: Lepidogma
- Species: L. latifasciata

Binomial name
- Lepidogma latifasciata (Wileman, 1911)

Synonyms
- Eulocastra latifasciata Wileman, 1911

Species of moth

Lepidogma latifasciata is a species of snout moth in the genus Lepidogma. It was originally described, by Wileman in 1911, under the noctuid genus Eulocastra. It is known from Hondo, and Yoshino, Japan.
