= Burkholderia pseudomultivorans =

Scientific classification
- Domain: Bacteria
- Kingdom: Pseudomonadati
- Phylum: Pseudomonadota
- Class: Betaproteobacteria
- Order: Burkholderiales
- Family: Burkholderiaceae
- Genus: Burkholderia
- Species: B. pseudomultivorans

Binomial name
- Burkholderia pseudomultivorans Peeters et al. 2014

Type strain
- CCUG 62895, LMG 26883

Species of bacterium

Burkholderia pseudomultivorans is a gram-negative bacterium from the genus Burkholderia and the family Burkholderiaceae which was isolated from samples of the human respiratory tract. Burkholderia pseudomultivorans belongs to the Burkholderia cepacia complex.
