= Oxygen regulation =

Oxygen regulation may refer to:

- Control of ventilation, the physiological mechanisms involved in the control of breathing
- Erotic asphyxiation, for the purposes of sexual arousal

== See also ==
- Aerobic denitrification
- Pressure regulator
- Breathing apparatus
