= Lepidogma megaloceros =

Scientific classification
- Domain: Eukaryota
- Kingdom: Animalia
- Phylum: Arthropoda
- Class: Insecta
- Order: Lepidoptera
- Family: Pyralidae
- Genus: Lepidogma
- Species: L. megaloceros

Binomial name
- Lepidogma megaloceros Meyrick, 1934

Species of moth

Lepidogma megaloceros is a species of snout moth in the genus Lepidogma. It was described by Edward Meyrick in 1934, and is known from the Democratic Republic of the Congo (it was described from Elisabethville).
