= Lepidogma melanospila =

Scientific classification
- Kingdom: Animalia
- Phylum: Arthropoda
- Class: Insecta
- Order: Lepidoptera
- Family: Pyralidae
- Genus: Lepidogma
- Species: L. melanospila

Binomial name
- Lepidogma melanospila Hampson, 1916

Species of moth

Lepidogma melanospila is a species of snout moth in the genus Lepidogma. It was described by George Hampson in 1916 and is known from Ghana (including the type location, Bibianaha).
