= Lepidogma rufescens =

Scientific classification
- Kingdom: Animalia
- Phylum: Arthropoda
- Class: Insecta
- Order: Lepidoptera
- Family: Pyralidae
- Genus: Lepidogma
- Species: L. rufescens

Binomial name
- Lepidogma rufescens Hampson, 1896

Species of moth

Lepidogma rufescens is a species of snout moth in the genus Lepidogma. It was described by George Hampson in 1896 and is known from Bhutan.
