= Lepidogma melanobasis =

Scientific classification
- Kingdom: Animalia
- Phylum: Arthropoda
- Class: Insecta
- Order: Lepidoptera
- Family: Pyralidae
- Genus: Lepidogma
- Species: L. melanobasis

Binomial name
- Lepidogma melanobasis Hampson, 1906

Synonyms
- Stericta tripartita Wileman & South, 1917

Species of moth

Lepidogma melanobasis is a species of snout moth in the genus Lepidogma. It was described by George Hampson in 1906 and is known from Japan, Taiwan and China.

The wingspan is 18–21 mm.
