= Lepidogma farinodes =

Scientific classification
- Domain: Eukaryota
- Kingdom: Animalia
- Phylum: Arthropoda
- Class: Insecta
- Order: Lepidoptera
- Family: Pyralidae
- Genus: Lepidogma
- Species: L. farinodes

Binomial name
- Lepidogma farinodes de Joannis, 1930

Species of moth

Lepidogma farinodes is a species of snout moth belonging to the genus Lepidogma. It is native to Vietnam.
