= Lepidogma rubricalis =

Scientific classification
- Kingdom: Animalia
- Phylum: Arthropoda
- Class: Insecta
- Order: Lepidoptera
- Family: Pyralidae
- Genus: Lepidogma
- Species: L. rubricalis

Binomial name
- Lepidogma rubricalis Hampson, 1906

Species of moth

Lepidogma rubricalis is a species of snout moth in the genus Lepidogma. It was described by George Hampson in 1906 and is known from Zimbabwe (including the type location Salisbury) and South Africa.
