= Burkholderia arboris =

Scientific classification
- Domain: Bacteria
- Kingdom: Pseudomonadati
- Phylum: Pseudomonadota
- Class: Betaproteobacteria
- Order: Burkholderiales
- Family: Burkholderiaceae
- Genus: Burkholderia
- Species: B. arboris

Binomial name
- Burkholderia arboris Vanlaere et al. 2008

Type strain
- CCUG 54561, ES0263, ES0263A, LMG 24066, R-24201, R-24201 t1

Species of bacterium

Burkholderia arboris is a Gram-negative, aerobic, non-spore-forming bacterium of the genus Burkholderia and the family Burkholderiaceae. B. arboris belongs to the Burkholderia cepacia complex.
