= Lepidogma flagellalis =

Scientific classification
- Kingdom: Animalia
- Phylum: Arthropoda
- Class: Insecta
- Order: Lepidoptera
- Family: Pyralidae
- Genus: Lepidogma
- Species: L. flagellalis

Binomial name
- Lepidogma flagellalis Hampson, 1906

Species of moth

Lepidogma flagellalis is a species of snout moth in the genus Lepidogma. It is known from Borneo (it was described from Kuching).
