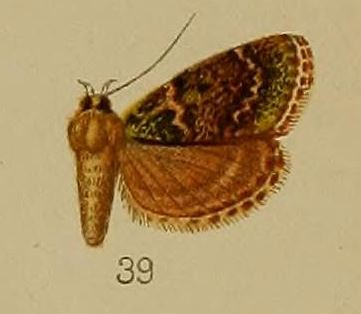
- Lepidogma chlorophilalis Hampson, 1912

Scientific classification
- Kingdom: Animalia
- Phylum: Arthropoda
- Class: Insecta
- Order: Lepidoptera
- Family: Pyralidae
- Subfamily: Epipaschiinae
- Genus: Lepidogma; Meyrick, 1890

Synonyms
- Precopia Ragonot, 1891; Asopina Chritstoph, 1893

= Lepidogma =

Genus of moths

Lepidogma is a genus of snout moths. It was described by Edward Meyrick in 1890.

== Species ==
- Lepidogma ambifaria
- Lepidogma atomalis (Christoph, 1887)
- Lepidogma chlorophilalis Hampson, 1912
- Lepidogma farinodes
- Lepidogma flagellalis
- Lepidogma hyrcanalis
- Lepidogma latifasciata
- Lepidogma megaloceros
- Lepidogma melaleucalis
- Lepidogma melanobasis
- Lepidogma melanolopha
- Lepidogma melanospila
- Lepidogma minimalis
- Lepidogma obatralis (Christoph, 1877)
- Lepidogma olivalis (Swinhoe, 1895)
- Lepidogma rubricalis
- Lepidogma rufescens
- Lepidogma tamaricalis (Mann, 1873)
- Lepidogma violescens Dyar, 1914
- Lepidogma wiltshirei
