= Lepidogma wiltshirei =

Scientific classification
- Domain: Eukaryota
- Kingdom: Animalia
- Phylum: Arthropoda
- Class: Insecta
- Order: Lepidoptera
- Family: Pyralidae
- Genus: Lepidogma
- Species: L. wiltshirei

Binomial name
- Lepidogma wiltshirei Amsel, 1949

Species of moth

Lepidogma wiltshirei is a species of snout moth in the genus Lepidogma. It was described by Hans Georg Amsel in 1949 and is known from Iraq (including the type location Baghdad).
