= Lepidogma hyrcanalis =

Scientific classification
- Domain: Eukaryota
- Kingdom: Animalia
- Phylum: Arthropoda
- Class: Insecta
- Order: Lepidoptera
- Family: Pyralidae
- Genus: Lepidogma
- Species: L. hyrcanalis

Binomial name
- Lepidogma hyrcanalis Amsel, 1961

Species of moth

Lepidogma hyrcanalis is a species of snout moth in the genus Lepidogma. It is known from Iran.
