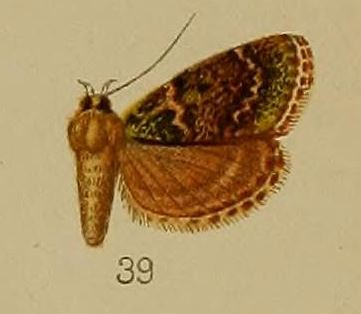

Scientific classification
- Domain: Eukaryota
- Kingdom: Animalia
- Phylum: Arthropoda
- Class: Insecta
- Order: Lepidoptera
- Family: Pyralidae
- Genus: Lepidogma
- Species: L. chlorophilalis

Binomial name
- Lepidogma chlorophilalis Hampson, 1912

= Lepidogma chlorophilalis =

Species of moth

Lepidogma chlorophilalis is a species of snout moth in the genus Lepidogma. It was described by George Hampson in 1912 and is known from Sri Lanka.
