= Lepidogma obatralis =

Scientific classification
- Domain: Eukaryota
- Kingdom: Animalia
- Phylum: Arthropoda
- Class: Insecta
- Order: Lepidoptera
- Family: Pyralidae
- Genus: Lepidogma
- Species: L. obatralis

Binomial name
- Lepidogma obatralis (Christoph, 1877)

Synonyms
- Asopia obatralis Christoph, 1877

Species of moth

Lepidogma obatralis is a species of snout moth in the genus Lepidogma. It was described by Hugo Theodor Christoph in 1877 and is known from Turkmenistan (including the type location Krasnowodsk).
