= Walter H. Burkholder =

American plant pathologist (1891–1983)

Walter Hagemeyer Burkholder (February 1, 1891 – January 31, 1983) was an American plant pathologist who helped establish the role of bacteria as plant pathogens. He was awarded a Ph.D. by Cornell University in 1917 and subsequently appointed as professor of plant pathology.

In 1950 he first described the bacteria, Pseudomonas cepacia, later Burkholderia spp., responsible for causing sour skin disease in onions and colonising the rhizosphere of many plant species. Bacterial strains from the Burkholderia cepacia complex (Bcc) are opportunistic pathogens in humans with cystic fibrosis and have been implicated in vertebral osteomyelitis in intravenous drug abusers. This complex of at least nine closely related species or genomovars is currently the focus of research because of their remarkable variability as plant and human pathogens, saprophytes, and biocontrol and bioremediation agents.

Burkholder was a member of the Society of American Bacteriologists.

== Bibliography ==
- Diseases and Insect and other Pests of the Field Bean in New York (Cornell Extension Bulletin. no. 58.) - Walter H. Burkholder, Cyrus Richard Crosby
