= Lepidogma minimalis =

Scientific classification
- Kingdom: Animalia
- Phylum: Arthropoda
- Class: Insecta
- Order: Lepidoptera
- Family: Pyralidae
- Genus: Lepidogma
- Species: L. minimalis

Binomial name
- Lepidogma minimalis Hampson, 1916

Species of moth

Lepidogma minimalis is a species of snout moth in the genus Lepidogma. It was described by George Hampson in 1916 and is known from Sri Lanka (including the type location, Perdeniya).
