= Burkholderia dolosa =

Scientific classification
- Domain: Bacteria
- Kingdom: Pseudomonadati
- Phylum: Pseudomonadota
- Class: Betaproteobacteria
- Order: Burkholderiales
- Family: Burkholderiaceae
- Genus: Burkholderia
- Species: B. dolosa

Binomial name
- Burkholderia dolosa Vermis et al. 2004

Species of bacterium

Burkholderia dolosa is a species of bacteria. It is a member of the Burkholderia cepacia complex. This particular strain is highly drug resistant and found primarily in immunocompromised patients. It was originally identified in several cystic fibrosis patients at Boston Children's Hospital.
