= Burkholderia singularis =

Scientific classification
- Domain: Bacteria
- Kingdom: Pseudomonadati
- Phylum: Pseudomonadota
- Class: Betaproteobacteria
- Order: Burkholderiales
- Family: Burkholderiaceae
- Genus: Burkholderia
- Species: B. singularis

Binomial name
- Burkholderia singularis Vandamme et al. 2017

Species of bacterium

Burkholderia singularis is a species of gram-negative bacteria from the phylum Pseudomonadota. Burkholderia singularis can be distinguished from other Burkholderia species through multilocus sequence analysis, MALDI-TOF mass spectrometry, and its unique biochemical profile, which includes the absence of nitrate reduction, a mucoid colony morphology on Columbia sheep blood agar, and a slowly positive oxidase reaction.
