= Lepidogma atomalis =

Scientific classification
- Kingdom: Animalia
- Phylum: Arthropoda
- Class: Insecta
- Order: Lepidoptera
- Family: Pyralidae
- Genus: Lepidogma
- Species: L. atomalis

Binomial name
- Lepidogma atomalis (Christoph, 1887)

Synonyms
- Hypotia atomalis Christoph, 1887

Species of moth

Lepidogma atomalis is a species of snout moth in the genus Lepidogma. It was described by Hugo Theodor Christoph in 1887 and is known from Turkey.
