= Lepidogma violescens =

Scientific classification
- Domain: Eukaryota
- Kingdom: Animalia
- Phylum: Arthropoda
- Class: Insecta
- Order: Lepidoptera
- Family: Pyralidae
- Genus: Lepidogma
- Species: L. violescens

Binomial name
- Lepidogma violescens Dyar, 1914

Species of moth

Lepidogma violescens is a species of snout moth in the genus Lepidogma. It was described by Harrison Gray Dyar Jr. in 1914 and is known from Panama.
