= Lepidogma melonolopha =

Scientific classification
- Kingdom: Animalia
- Phylum: Arthropoda
- Class: Insecta
- Order: Lepidoptera
- Family: Pyralidae
- Genus: Lepidogma
- Species: L. melonolopha

Binomial name
- Lepidogma melonolopha Hampson, 1912

Synonyms
- Stericta dubia Wileman-South, 1917

Species of moth

Lepidogma melonolopha is a species of snout moth in the genus Lepidogma. It is known from Sri Lanka and Taiwan.
