= Lepidogma tamaricalis =

Scientific classification
- Domain: Eukaryota
- Kingdom: Animalia
- Phylum: Arthropoda
- Class: Insecta
- Order: Lepidoptera
- Family: Pyralidae
- Genus: Lepidogma
- Species: L. tamaricalis

Binomial name
- Lepidogma tamaricalis (Mann, 1873)

Synonyms
- Hypotia tamaricalis Mann, 1873; Hypotia vafera Swinhoe, 1884

Species of insect

Lepidogma tamaricalis is a species of snout moth. It is found in mainland Italy and on Sardinia, in Asia, including Pakistan, as well as in North Africa and on the Iberian Peninsula.

The larvae feed on Tamarix species.
