= Burkholderia oklahomensis =

Scientific classification
- Domain: Bacteria
- Kingdom: Pseudomonadati
- Phylum: Pseudomonadota
- Class: Betaproteobacteria
- Order: Burkholderiales
- Family: Burkholderiaceae
- Genus: Burkholderia
- Species: B. oklahomensis

Binomial name
- Burkholderia oklahomensis Glass et al. 2006

Type strain
- ATCC BAA-1222, C6786, CCUG 51349, CDC 6786, CDC C6786, LMG 23618, NCTC 13387

Species of bacterium

Burkholderia oklahomensis is a gram-negative, catalase and oxidase-positive aerobic, motile bacterium from the genus of Burkholderia and the family of Burkholderiaceae which was isolated 1973 from a wound infection caused by a farming accident in Oklahoma in the United States. Burkholderia oklahomensis is a bacterium which has been described in association with melioidosis. Colonies of Burkholderia oklahomensis are white colored.
