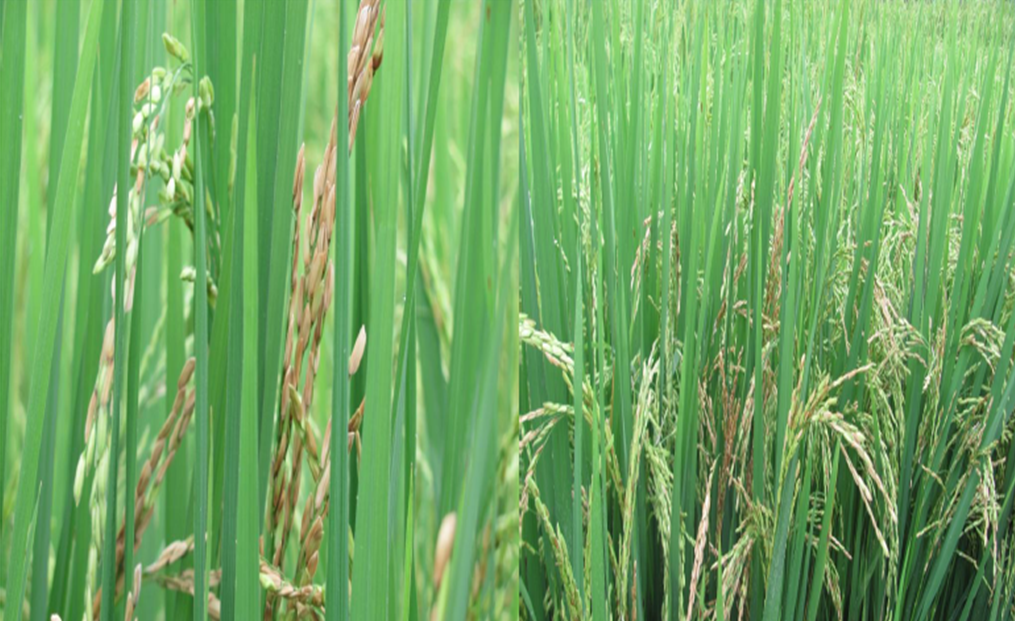

Scientific classification
- Domain: Bacteria
- Kingdom: Pseudomonadati
- Phylum: Pseudomonadota
- Class: Betaproteobacteria
- Order: Burkholderiales
- Family: Burkholderiaceae
- Genus: Burkholderia
- Species: B. glumae

Binomial name
- Burkholderia glumae (Kurita and Tabei 1967); Urakami et al. 1994

Synonyms
- Pseudomonas glumae Kurita and Tabei 1967

= Burkholderia glumae =

Disease-causing bacterium

Burkholderia glumae is a Gram-negative, soil-borne, betaproteobacterium.

== Genome ==
Of all bacteria with the necessary sequence data available, B. glumae has the highest number of prophages (bacteriophages integrated into its genome).
