= Burkholderia ubonensis =

Scientific classification
- Domain: Bacteria
- Kingdom: Pseudomonadati
- Phylum: Pseudomonadota
- Class: Betaproteobacteria
- Order: Burkholderiales
- Family: Burkholderiaceae
- Genus: Burkholderia
- Species: B. ubonensis

Binomial name
- Burkholderia ubonensis Yabuuchi et al. 2000

Species of bacterium

Burkholderia ubonensis is a species of gram-negative bacteria in the phylum Pseudomonadota. B. ubonensis was first described in 2000.
