= Burkholderia pyrrocinia =

Scientific classification
- Domain: Bacteria
- Kingdom: Pseudomonadati
- Phylum: Pseudomonadota
- Class: Betaproteobacteria
- Order: Burkholderiales
- Family: Burkholderiaceae
- Genus: Burkholderia
- Species: B. pyrrocinia

Binomial name
- Burkholderia pyrrocinia (Imanaka et al. 1965); Vandamme et al. 1997

Synonyms
- Pseudomonas pyrrocinia Imanaka et al. 1965

Species of bacterium

Burkholderia pyrrocinia is a Gram-negative bacterium which has been found in soil as well as in the sputum of patients with cystic fibrosis.
