= Burkholderia anthina =

Scientific classification
- Domain: Bacteria
- Kingdom: Pseudomonadati
- Phylum: Pseudomonadota
- Class: Betaproteobacteria
- Order: Burkholderiales
- Family: Burkholderiaceae
- Genus: Burkholderia
- Species: B. anthina

Binomial name
- Burkholderia anthina (Palleroni and Holmes 1981); Vandamme et al. 2002

Species of bacterium

Burkholderia anthina is a species of bacteria of the family Burkholderiaceae.
