= Nitric oxide reductase (cytochrome c) =

Identifiers
- EC no.: 1.7.2.5

Databases
- IntEnz: IntEnz view
- BRENDA: BRENDA entry
- ExPASy: NiceZyme view
- KEGG: KEGG entry
- MetaCyc: metabolic pathway
- PRIAM: profile
- PDB structures: RCSB PDB PDBe PDBsum
Search
- PMC: articles
- PubMed: articles
- NCBI: proteins

Nitric oxide reductase (cytochrome c) (EC 1.7.2.5) is an enzyme with systematic name nitrous oxide:ferricytochrome-c oxidoreductase. This enzyme catalyses the following chemical reaction

2 nitric oxide + 2 ferrocytochrome c + 2 H^{+} $\rightleftharpoons$ nitrous oxide + 2 ferricytochrome c + H_{2}O

The enzyme from Pseudomonas aeruginosa contains a dinuclear centre.
