= Burkholderia multivorans =

Scientific classification
- Domain: Bacteria
- Kingdom: Pseudomonadati
- Phylum: Pseudomonadota
- Class: Betaproteobacteria
- Order: Burkholderiales
- Family: Burkholderiaceae
- Genus: Burkholderia
- Species: B. multivorans

Binomial name
- Burkholderia multivorans Vandamme et al. 1997

Species of bacterium

Burkholderia multivorans is a species of gram-negative bacteria in the phylum Pseudomonadota. The cells are rod-shaped. It is known to cause human disease, such as colonisation of the lung in cystic fibrosis.
