= Burkholderia stabilis =

Scientific classification
- Domain: Bacteria
- Kingdom: Pseudomonadati
- Phylum: Pseudomonadota
- Class: Betaproteobacteria
- Order: Burkholderiales
- Family: Burkholderiaceae
- Genus: Burkholderia
- Species: B. stabilis

Binomial name
- Burkholderia stabilis Vandamme et al. 2000

Species of bacterium

Burkholderia stabilis is a species of gram-negative bacteria. Between 2018 and August 2025, 51 cases of infection by Burkholderia stabilis in humans were identified in the United Kingdom. The cases were thought to result from the use of some types of non-sterile alcohol-free wipe and the public were advised not to use the products.
