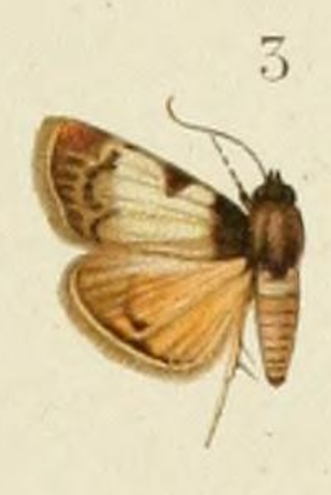
- Lepidogma ambifaria ♀

Scientific classification
- Domain: Eukaryota
- Kingdom: Animalia
- Phylum: Arthropoda
- Class: Insecta
- Order: Lepidoptera
- Family: Pyralidae
- Genus: Lepidogma
- Species: L. ambifaria

Binomial name
- Lepidogma ambifaria (Hering, 1901)

Synonyms
- Stericta ambifaria Hering, 1901

= Lepidogma ambifaria =

Species of moth

Lepidogma ambifaria is a species of snout moth in the genus Lepidogma. It is known from Borneo and Sumatra in Indonesia.
