= RsmY RNA family =

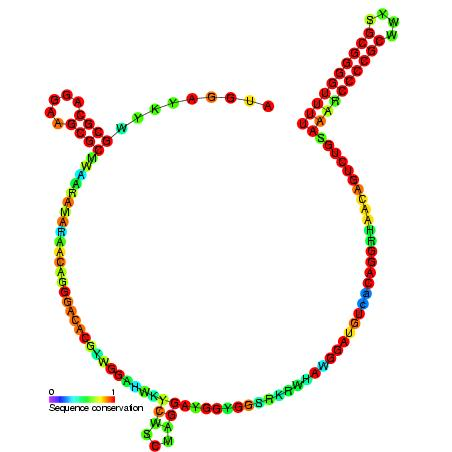
- Predicted secondary structure and sequence conservation of RsmY

Identifiers
- Symbol: RsmY
- Rfam: RF00195

Other data
- RNA type: Gene; sRNA
- Domain: Bacteria
- SO: SO:0000655
- PDB structures: PDBe

The rsmY RNA family is a set of related non-coding RNA genes, that like RsmZ, is regulated by the GacS/GacA signal transduction system in the plant-beneficial soil bacterium and biocontrol model organism Pseudomonas fluorescens CHA0. GacA/GacS target genes are translationally repressed by the small RNA binding protein RsmA. RsmY and RsmZ RNAs bind RsmA to relieve this repression and so enhance secondary metabolism and biocontrol traits.

Studies in Legionella pneumophila have shown that the ncRNAs RsmY and RsmZ together with the proteins LetA and CsrA are involved in a regulatory cascade. Also, it appears that these ncRNAs are regulated by RpoS sigma-factor.

== See also ==
- CsrB/RsmB RNA family
- CsrC RNA family
- PrrB/RsmZ RNA family
- RsmX
- RsmW sRNA
- CsrA protein
