= Ashdown's medium =

Selective culture medium in microbiology

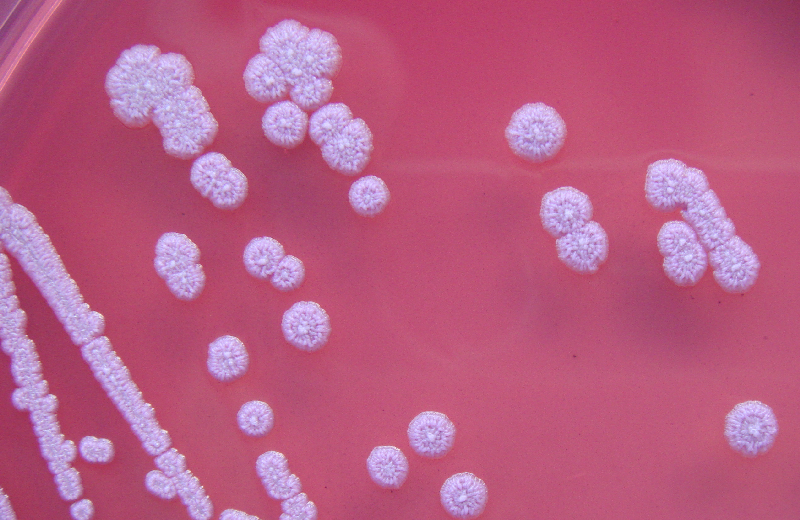
Burkholderia pseudomallei on Ashdown's medium

Ashdown's medium is a selective culture medium for the isolation and characterisation of Burkholderia pseudomallei (the bacterium that causes melioidosis).

Ashdown's medium was first described by LR Ashdown in 1979. It is used for the selective isolation of B. pseudomallei from clinical specimens taken from non-sterile sites (e.g., sputum) as well as to produce the characteristic morphology of B. pseudomallei.

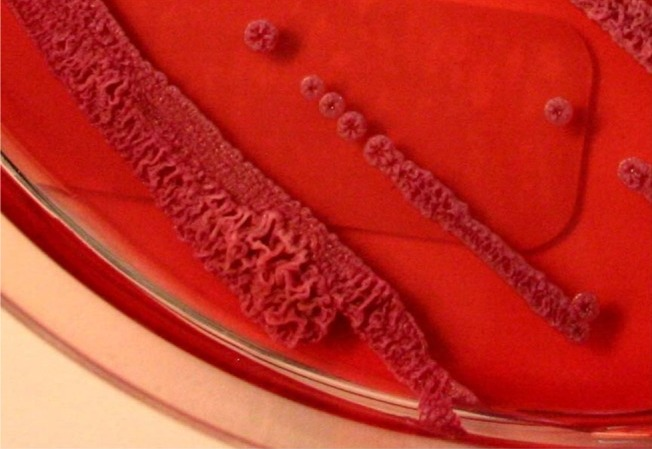
Burkholderia humptydooensis, a bacteria related to Burkholderia pseudomallei, grown on Ashdown's medium

The medium contains crystal violet and gentamicin as selective agents to suppress the growth of other bacteria. Colonies of B. pseudomallei also take up neutral red which is present in the medium, and this further helps to distinguish it from other bacteria. Gentamicin slightly inhibits the growth of B. pseudomallei and so specimens inoculated onto Ashdown's agar needs to be incubated for a minimum of 96 hours instead of 48 hours. The medium is also enriched with 4% glycerol, which is required by some strains of B. pseudomallei to grow. B. pseudomallei usually produces flat wrinkled purple colonies on Ashdown's agar.
