= Eulocastra =

Scientific classification
- Domain: Eukaryota
- Kingdom: Animalia
- Phylum: Arthropoda
- Class: Insecta
- Order: Lepidoptera
- Superfamily: Noctuoidea
- Family: Noctuidae
- Subfamily: Acontiinae
- Genus: Eulocastra; Butler, 1886

Genus of moths

Eulocastra is a genus of moths of the family Noctuidae.

== Species ==
- Eulocastra aethiops (Distant, 1898)
- Eulocastra albipunctella Hampson, 1918
- Eulocastra alfierii (Wiltshire, 1948)
- Eulocastra argentifrons (Butler, 1889)
- Eulocastra argentisparsa Hampson, 1910
- Eulocastra argyrogramma Hampson, 1914
- Eulocastra argyrostrota Hampson, 1916
- Eulocastra bryophilioides Brandt, 1938
- Eulocastra capnoessa Zerny, 1915
- Eulocastra carnibasalis Hampson, 1918
- Eulocastra chrysarginea (Schaus, 1906)
- Eulocastra diaphora (Staudinger, 1878)
- Eulocastra ecphaea Dognin, 1914
- Eulocastra eurynipha (Turner, 1902)
- Eulocastra excisa (Swinhoe, 1885)
- Eulocastra fasciata Butler, 1886
- Eulocastra hypotaenia (Wallengren, 1860)
- Eulocastra incognita Berio, 1954
- Eulocastra insignis (Butler, 1884)
- Eulocastra leucobasis Hampson, 1910
- Eulocastra melaena (Hampson, 1899)
- Eulocastra monozona Hampson, 1910
- Eulocastra neoexcisa Berio, 1954
- Eulocastra nigrata Berio, 1960
- Eulocastra nirivittata (Warren, 1888)
- Eulocastra ochrizona Hampson, 1910
- Eulocastra pallida Hampson, 1918
- Eulocastra phaeella Hampson, 1918
- Eulocastra phaeozona Hampson, 1910
- Eulocastra platizona (Lederer, 1869)
- Eulocastra poliogramma Hampson, 1918
- Eulocastra pseudozarboides Rothschild, 1921
- Eulocastra quintana (Swinhoe, 1885)
- Eulocastra rex (Wiltshire, 1948)
- Eulocastra sahariensis Rothschild, 1921
- Eulocastra seminigra Hampson, 1914
- Eulocastra sudanensis Rebel, 1917
- Eulocastra tamsi Berio, 1938
- Eulocastra tamsina Brandt, 1947
- Eulocastra tapina Hampson, 1910
- Eulocastra tarachodes Hampson, 1914
- Eulocastra thermozona Hampson, 1910
- Eulocastra tripartita (Butler, 1886)
- Eulocastra zavattarii Berio, 1944
