= PrrB/RsmZ RNA family =

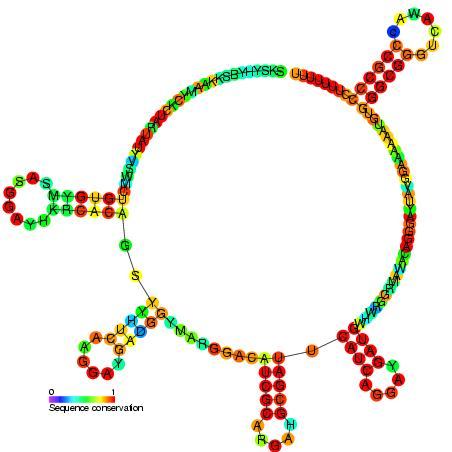
- Predicted secondary structure and sequence conservation of PrrB_RsmZ

Identifiers
- Symbol: PrrB_RsmZ
- Rfam: RF00166

Other data
- RNA type: Gene; sRNA
- Domain(s): Bacteria
- GO: GO:0006401 GO:0006109
- SO: SO:0000655
- PDB structures: PDBe

The PrrB/RsmZ RNA family are a group of related non-coding RNA molecules found in bacteria. PrrB RNA is able to phenotypically complement gacS and gacA mutants and is itself regulated by the GacS-GacA two-component signal transduction system. Inactivation of the prrB gene in Pseudomonas fluorescens F113 resulted in a significant reduction of 2, 4-diacetylphloroglucinol (Phl) and hydrogen cyanide (HCN) production, while increased metabolite production was observed when prrB was overexpressed. The prrB gene sequence contains a number of imperfect repeats of the consensus sequence 5′-AGGA-3′, and sequence analysis predicted a complex secondary structure featuring multiple putative stem-loops with the consensus sequences predominantly positioned at the single-stranded regions at the ends of the stem-loops. This structure is similar to the CsrB and RsmB regulatory RNAs (CsrB/RsmB RNA family), suggesting this RNA also interacts with a CsrA-like protein.

Studies in Legionella pneumophila have shown that the ncRNAs RsmY and RsmZ together with the proteins LetA and CsrA are involved in a regulatory cascade. Also, it appears that these ncRNAs are regulated by RpoS sigma-factor.

== See also ==
- CsrB/RsmB RNA family
- CsrC RNA family
- RsmY RNA family
- RsmX
- RsmW sRNA
- CsrA protein
