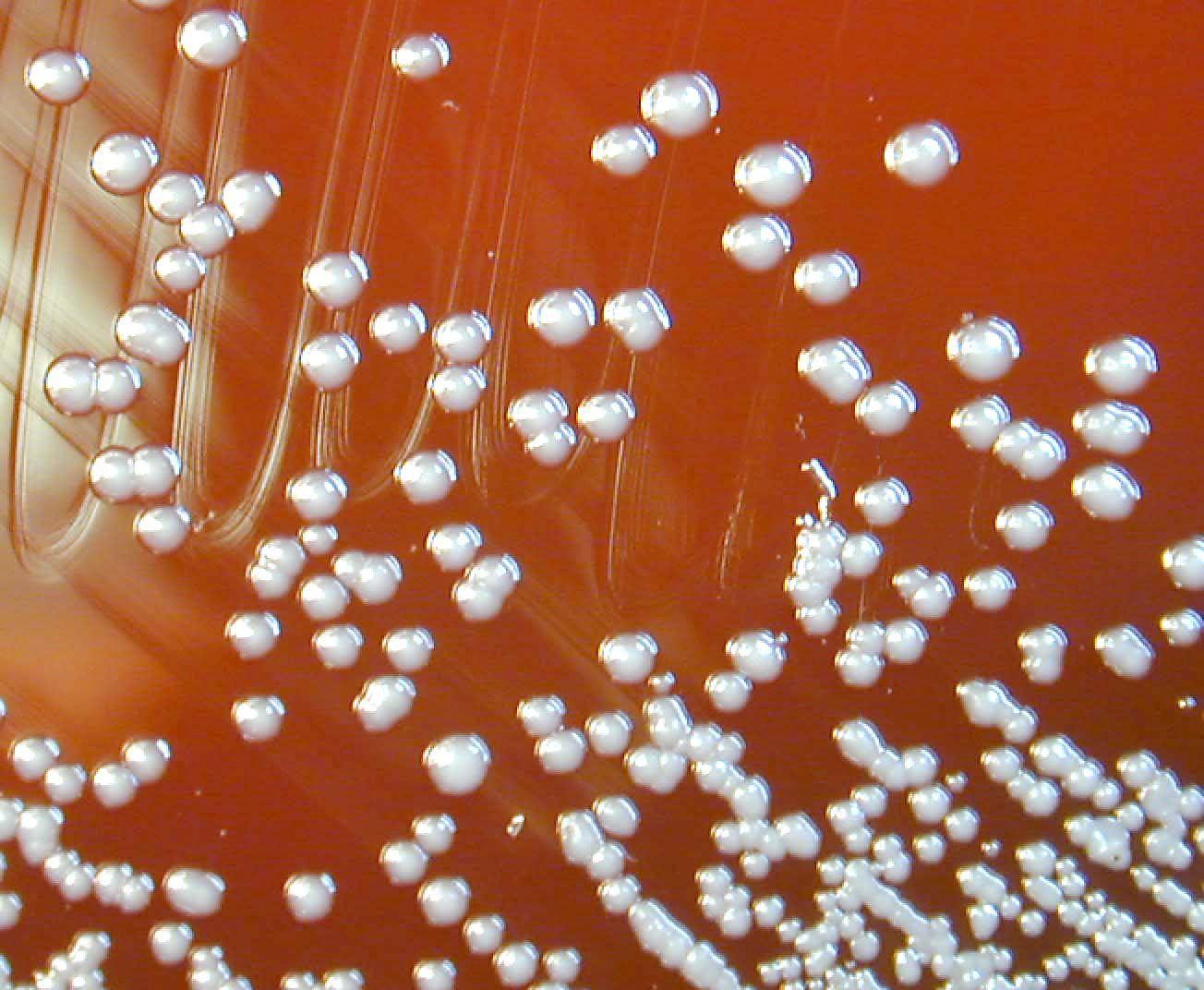
- B. pseudomallei colonies on a blood agar plate.

Scientific classification
- Domain: Bacteria
- Kingdom: Pseudomonadati
- Phylum: Pseudomonadota
- Class: Betaproteobacteria
- Order: Burkholderiales
- Family: Burkholderiaceae
- Genus: Burkholderia; Yabuuchi et al. 1993

Type species
- Burkholderia cepacia (Palleroni and Holmes 1981) Yabuuchi et al. 1993

Species
- See text

= Burkholderia =

Genus of bacteria

Burkholderia is a genus of Pseudomonadota whose pathogenic members include the Burkholderia cepacia complex, which attacks humans and plants; Burkholderia mallei, responsible for glanders, a disease that occurs mostly in horses and related animals; Burkholderia pseudomallei, causative agent of melioidosis; and Burkholderia cenocepacia, an important pathogen of pulmonary infections in people with cystic fibrosis (CF). Burkholderia species is also found in marine environments. S.I. Paul et al. isolated and characterized Burkholderia cepacia from marine sponges of the Saint Martin's Island of the Bay of Bengal, Bangladesh.

The Burkholderia (previously part of Pseudomonas) genus name refers to a group of virtually ubiquitous Gram-negative, obligately aerobic, rod-shaped bacteria that are motile by means of single or multiple polar flagella, with the exception of Burkholderia mallei, which is nonmotile. Members belonging to the genus do not produce sheaths or prosthecae and are able to use poly-beta-hydroxybutyrate (PHB) for growth. The genus includes both animal and plant pathogens, as well as some environmentally important species. In particular, B. xenovorans (previously named Pseudomonas cepacia then B. cepacia and B. fungorum) is renowned for being catalase positive (affecting patients with chronic granulomatous disease) and its ability to degrade chlororganic pesticides and polychlorinated biphenyls. The conserved RNA structure anti-hemB RNA motif is found in all known bacteria in this genus.

Due to their antibiotic resistance and the high mortality rate from their associated diseases, B. mallei and B. pseudomallei are considered to be potential biological warfare agents, targeting livestock and humans.

== History ==
The genus was named after Walter H. Burkholder, plant pathologist at Cornell University. The first species placed in the genus were transfers from Pseudomonas, on the basis of various biochemical tests.

Until recently, the genus Burkholderia was inclusive of all Paraburkholderia species. However, the genus Paraburkholderia is phylogenetically distinct, and can be distinguished from all Burkholderia species on the basis of molecular signatures that are uniquely found for each genus.

== Taxonomy ==
Burkholderia species form a monophyletic group within the Burkholderiales order of the Betaproteobacteria. Currently, the 48 validly named species can be distinguished from related genera (i.e. Paraburkholderia) and all other bacteria by conserved signature indels in a variety of proteins. These indels represent exclusive common ancestry shared among all Burkholderia species.

The genus has three distinct monophyletic clusters. One group consists of all species belonging to the Burkholderia cepacia complex, another clade comprises B. pseudomallei and closely related species, and the last clade encompasses of most of the phytogenic species within the genus, including B. glumae and B. gladioli . Conserved signature indels are specific for each of these subgroups within the genus that aid in demarcating members of this extremely large and diverse genus.

== Research ==
Recently, research in Burkholderia species has investigated a range of topics and characteristics including metabolomic response to antibiotics, contact-dependent interactions between bacterial communities, and genomic potential to yield beneficial products.

In Burkholderia species, certain antibiotics such as trimethoprim has been shown to induce and upregulate a large amount of the metabolome, inducing over 100 silent secondary metabolite gene clusters in Burkholderia thailandensis. These global activators can be used as a source of investigation into how the metabolomes of pathogenic bacterial species respond to antibiotic stress and how bacterial species can vary in response to them. It has been shown that closely related cystic fibrosis-associated Burkholderia species respond to trimethoprim with differing levels of expression of various secondary metabolites, highlighting the personalized nature of metabolomics in related bacterial strains.

Research focused on interbacterial signaling using Burkholderia has shown that contact-dependent growth inhibition plays a significant role in mediating cell to cell communication specifically in B. thailandensis. In this interaction, cells release protein toxins to the surrounding environment, and only those with a corresponding protective protein (usually bacteria of the same strain) will not have its growth inhibited or die. Furthermore, recipient cells that have the corresponding protein then undergo changes to gene expression and phenotype that promotes community formation in the form of biofilms. This occurs even if the recipient cell was not of the same bacterial strain which highlights the importance of this system. The genes that encode the protein toxins and the rest of the contact-dependent inhibition system can become mobile in the form of a transposon that can transfer between cells and is critical to communal aspect of the system. Thus, contact-dependent signaling plays a significant role in bacterial self recognition and community formation.

Burkholderia species have been shown to be a potential source of beneficial products such as antimicrobials and biosurfactants. Along with the related genus Pseudomonas, Burkholderia can synthesize a particular class of biosurfactant called rhamnolipids. Rhamnolipids synthesized by Burkholderia have differing chemical characteristics (compared to those synthesized by Pseudomonas) and thus have the potential for novel applications.

== Species ==
List of species:

- Burkholderia alpina
- Burkholderia ambifaria
- Burkholderia anthina
- Burkholderia arboris
- Burkholderia cenocepacia
- Burkholderia cepacia
- Burkholderia contaminans
- Burkholderia diffusa
- Burkholderia dolosa
- Burkholderia gladioli
- Burkholderia glumae
- Burkholderia humptydooensis
- Burkholderia lata
- Burkholderia latens
- Burkholderia mallei
- Burkholderia metallica
- Burkholderia multivorans
- Burkholderia oklahomensis
- Burkholderia plantarii
- Burkholderia pseudomallei
- Burkholderia pseudomultivorans
- Burkholderia puraquae
- Burkholderia pyrrocinia
- Burkholderia seminalis
- Burkholderia singaporensis
- Burkholderia singularis
- Burkholderia stabilis
- Burkholderia stagnalis
- Burkholderia territorii
- Burkholderia thailandensis
- Burkholderia ubonensis
- Burkholderia vietnamiensis

== See also ==
- MAEB RNA motif
