= Lingshui River =

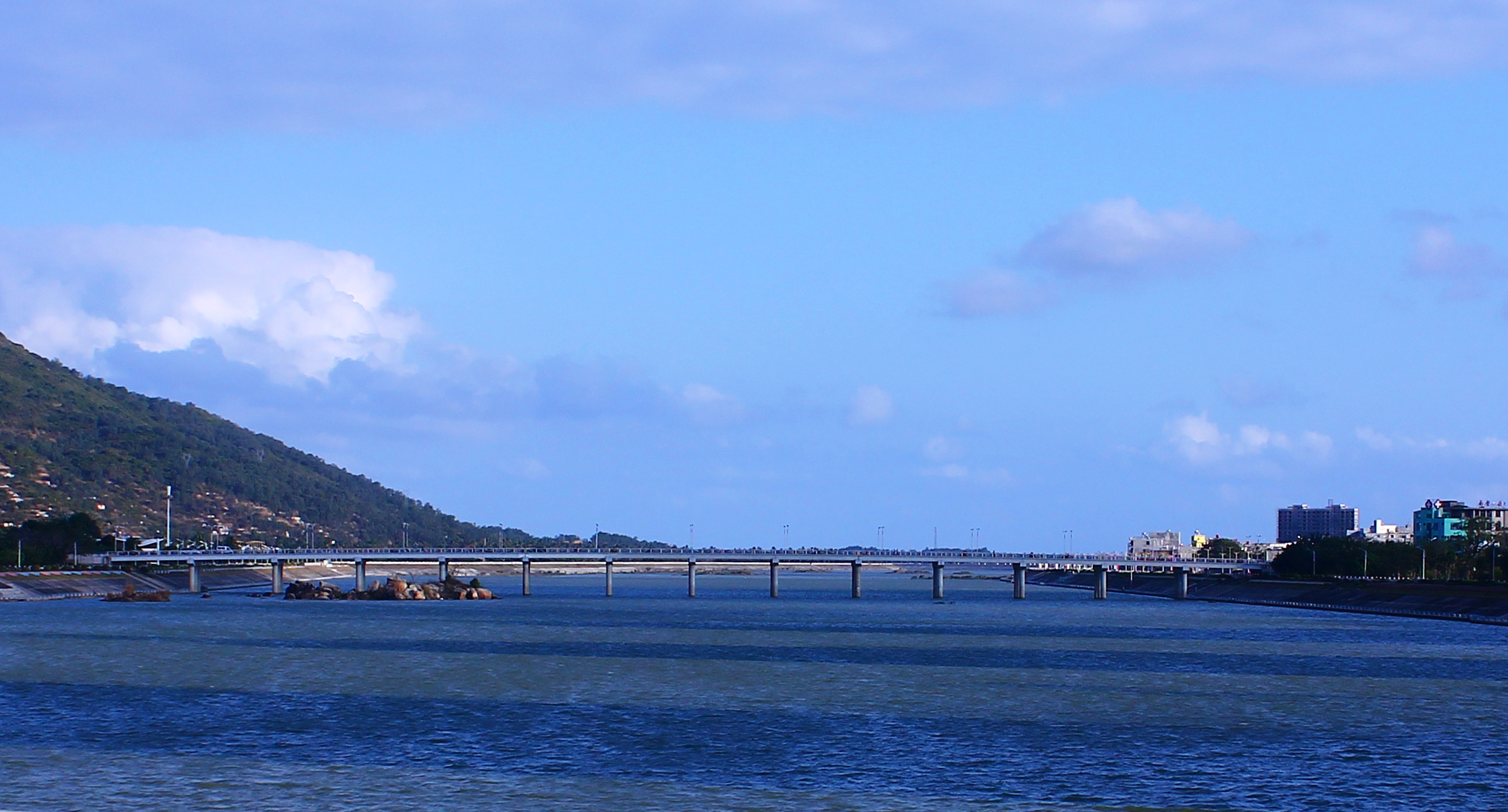
- Lingshui River in Lingshui Li Autonomous County.

Location
- Country: People's Republic of China

Physical characteristics
- Source
  - location: Xianfang Mountain, Baoting Li and Miao Autonomous County, Hainan Province
- Mouth
  - location: South China Sea
  - coordinates: 18°29′47″N 110°05′23″E
- Length: 73.5 km (45.7 mi)
- Basin size: 1,131 km^{2} (437 sq mi)

The Lingshui River (Chinese: 陵水河; pinyin: Língshuǐ Hé) is a river in Hainan Island, China. It rises in Xianfang Mountain of northeastern Baoting Li and Miao Autonomous County and flows eastward across the Lingshui Li Autonomous County to empty into the South China Sea. The river has a length of 73.5 km and drains an area of 1,131 square km.
