= Lepidogma olivalis =

Scientific classification
- Domain: Eukaryota
- Kingdom: Animalia
- Phylum: Arthropoda
- Class: Insecta
- Order: Lepidoptera
- Family: Pyralidae
- Genus: Lepidogma
- Species: L. olivalis

Binomial name
- Lepidogma olivalis (C. Swinhoe, 1895)

Synonyms
- Hypsopygia olivalis C. Swinhoe, 1895; Euryzonella olivalis; Ulotrichodes novalis Warren, 1896

Species of moth

Lepidogma olivalis is a species of snout moth in the genus Lepidogma. It was described by Charles Swinhoe in 1895, and is known from India (including Mahabaleshwar and Mumbai).
