= Virkon =

Disinfectant

Virkon is a multi-purpose disinfectant, manufactured by LANXESS AG at their site in Sudbury, England. It contains potassium peroxymonosulfate (an oxidizing agent), sodium dodecylbenzenesulfonate (a detergent), sulfamic acid (a cleaning agent), and inorganic buffers. It is typically used for cleaning up hazardous spills, disinfecting surfaces and soaking equipment. The solution is used in many areas, including hospitals, laboratories, nursing homes, funeral homes, dental and veterinary facilities, and anywhere else where control of pathogens is required.

1% Virkon has a wide spectrum of activity against pathogens. This includes at least 300 strains/clinical isolates from 76 bacteria, 47 strains/clinical isolates from 35 viruses, and 45 strains/clinical isolates from 17 fungi.

It has been proven effective against SARS-COV-2, the virus that causes coronavirus disease 2019 (COVID-19). However, it is less effective against pathogenic fungi than some alternative disinfectants.
