= Burkholderia vietnamiensis =

Scientific classification
- Domain: Bacteria
- Kingdom: Pseudomonadati
- Phylum: Pseudomonadota
- Class: Betaproteobacteria
- Order: Burkholderiales
- Family: Burkholderiaceae
- Genus: Burkholderia
- Species: B. vietnamiensis

Binomial name
- Burkholderia vietnamiensis Gillis et al. 1995

Species of bacterium

Burkholderia vietnamiensis is a species of gram-negative bacteria. It can be found as an opportunistic pathogen in patients with cystic fibrosis or other immunocompromising illnesses. It differs from most Burkholderia species in that it is often susceptible to aminoglycosides, but not polymyxin B. Many isolates have been found to be catalase positive. B. vietnamiensis is able to fix N_{2} (nitrogen fixation) and has been found to do so in symbiosis with wild poplar trees.
