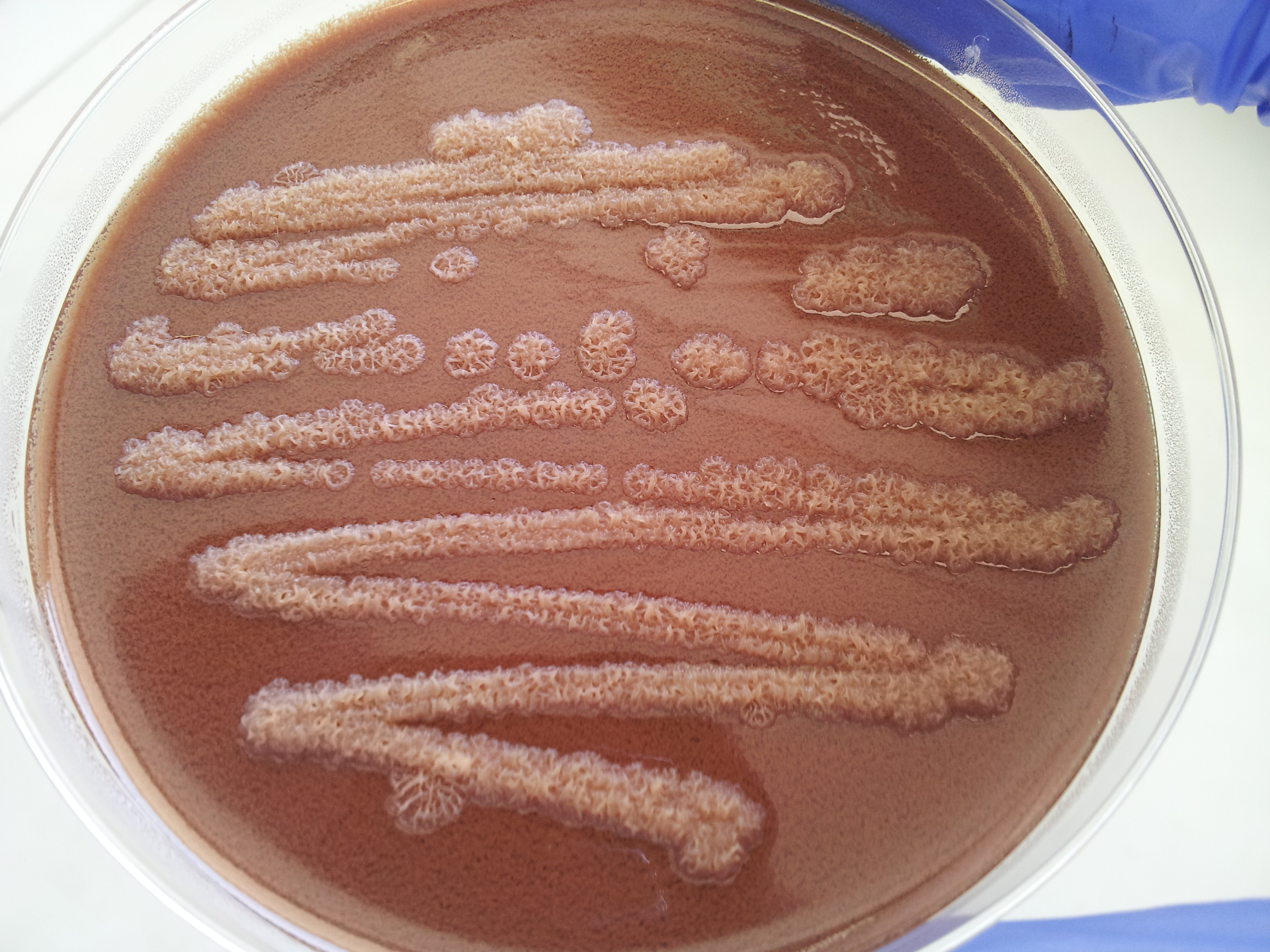

Scientific classification
- Domain: Bacteria
- Kingdom: Pseudomonadati
- Phylum: Pseudomonadota
- Class: Gammaproteobacteria
- Order: Pseudomonadales
- Family: Pseudomonadaceae
- Genus: Stutzerimonas
- Species: S. stutzeri

Binomial name
- Stutzerimonas stutzeri (Lehmann and Neumann 1896) Lalucat et al. 2022

Type strain
- ATCC 17588; CCUG 11256; CECT 930; CFBP 2443; CIP 103022; DSM 5190; JCM 5965; LMG 11199; NBRC 14165; NCTC 12262; VKM B-975

Synonyms
- Pseudomonas stutzeri (Lehmann and Neumann 1896) Sijderius 1946 (Approved Lists 1980); "Bacterium stutzeri" Lehmann and Neumann 1896

= Stutzerimonas stutzeri =

Species of bacterium

Stutzerimonas stutzeri is a Gram-negative, rod-shaped, and motile bacterium in the family Pseudomonadaceae. It is widely distributed in soil, freshwater, marine environments, wastewater, and in association with plants. Strains exhibit considerable physiological and genomic diversity and include denitrifying, nitrogen-fixing, and pollutant-degrading bacteria. The species is also a rare opportunistic pathogen of humans.

The species was formerly classified as Pseudomonas stutzeri. It was transferred to the newly established genus Stutzerimonas in 2022 and is the type species of that genus.

== Taxonomy ==
Stutzerimonas stutzeri was classified in Pseudomonas for much of the twentieth century. Genome-based analyses showed that the former P. stutzeri evolutionary group formed a lineage distinct from Pseudomonas sensu stricto, resulting in the establishment of Stutzerimonas and the new combination Stutzerimonas stutzeri in 2022. The combination was subsequently validly published under the International Code of Nomenclature of Prokaryotes.

The species historically encompassed numerous genomic groups known as genomovars. A 2022 core-genome analysis of 200 strains identified 45 phylogenomic species within Stutzerimonas, including 16 named species, and documented 22 genomovars associated with the former P. stutzeri group. That analysis treated Stutzerimonas stutzeri, Stutzerimonas perfectomarina, and Stutzerimonas chloritidismutans as distinct species; the latter two are therefore not included as synonyms in the taxobox.

== Discovery ==
The organism was described by Burri and Stutzer in 1895 as Bacillus denitrificans II. The name "Bacterium stutzeri" was introduced in 1896, and the organism was later classified as Pseudomonas stutzeri. Van Iterson developed a selective enrichment culture for the organism in 1902; the method was later described by van Niel and Allen. The enrichment medium contained nitrate and tartrate and was incubated anaerobically.

== Characterization ==
Stutzerimonas stutzeri is a Gram-negative, rod-shaped, non-spore-forming bacterium that is typically 1–3 micrometres long and 0.5–0.8 micrometres wide. It tests positive for both the catalase and oxidase tests. S. stutzeri grows optimally at approximately 35 °C, although growth has been reported from 4 to 44 °C. Growth rates vary among strains and culture media. Strains generally prefer a neutral pH and tolerate moderate concentrations of sodium chloride. Cells possess a polar flagellum and type IV pili, which contribute to motility and natural transformation, respectively.

Nitrogen fixation has been demonstrated in some strains of S. stutzeri. The genome of strain DSM 4166 contains genes involved in nitrogen fixation and denitrification. Other strains can reduce metals or degrade hydrocarbons. The species does not produce the fluorescent pigments characteristic of some species of Pseudomonas.

=== Growth conditions ===
S. stutzeri strains can use a range of electron donors and electron acceptors. Reported organic substrates include glucose, lactate, acetate, succinate, pyruvate, sucrose, and fumarate. Oxygen is used during aerobic respiration, whereas nitrate and other nitrogen oxides can serve as electron acceptors during anaerobic respiration. Colony morphology varies with the culture medium.

=== Colony characteristics ===
On solid media, colonies are generally dry, rigid, and cohesive, with raised edges and a depressed centre that can give them a crater-like appearance. Colonies are usually brown, although pigmentation and morphology vary with the growth medium.

== Metabolism ==
S. stutzeri is a facultative anaerobe with a respiratory metabolism. It uses oxygen aerobically and can use nitrate, nitrite or nitrous oxide under anaerobic conditions. The species has been extensively used in studies of denitrification.

=== Thiosulfate oxidation ===
Some strains oxidize thiosulfate to tetrathionate. Seven strains were shown to perform this reaction anaerobically using nitrite, nitrate or nitrous oxide as electron acceptors. The reaction does not provide sufficient energy for autotrophic growth, and the strains remain obligate heterotrophs.

=== Phosphite and hypophosphite oxidation ===
Strain WM88 oxidizes reduced phosphorus compounds, including phosphite and hypophosphite, to phosphate and can use either compound as its sole phosphorus source. Under anaerobic conditions with nitrate as the electron acceptor, phosphite oxidation continues, whereas hypophosphite oxidation does not.

=== Hydrocarbon degradation ===
==== Aliphatic hydrocarbon degradation ====
A strain now assigned to S. stutzeri was among the first bacteria reported to degrade alkanes. Strain KC, isolated from an aquifer, transforms carbon tetrachloride into carbon dioxide, formate, and other products and has been studied for in situ remediation of contaminated groundwater.

==== Aromatic hydrocarbon degradation ====
Strain P16, isolated from creosote-contaminated soil, degrades several polycyclic aromatic hydrocarbons. It can use phenanthrene, fluorene, naphthalene, and methylnaphthalenes as carbon and energy sources.

== Genomics ==
Early DNA–DNA hybridization and rRNA studies demonstrated substantial genomic diversity among strains then classified as Pseudomonas stutzeri. Genomovars were used to distinguish genomic groups that were phenotypically difficult to separate. Genome-based taxonomy subsequently divided the broader lineage into multiple species of Stutzerimonas.

Reported genomes have a G+C content of approximately 60–66 mol%. Strain DSM 4166 has a 4.69-Mb circular chromosome with a G+C content of 61.74%, 59 tRNA genes, and four rRNA operons. Strain RCH2 has a 4.6-Mb chromosome and three plasmids; genome comparisons identified strain-specific genes associated with functions including chemotaxis and pilus formation.

A 2020 analysis conducted before the establishment of Stutzerimonas placed 19 genomes in the broader P. stutzeri evolutionary group. These genomes encoded 3,342–4,524 proteins, of which 2,080 were shared across the group.

== Ecology ==
Stutzerimonas stutzeri has been isolated from soil, freshwater, wastewater, marine water and sediments, contaminated sites, and plant-associated environments. Marine strains have been recovered from surface waters, coastal sediments, hydrothermal-vent environments, and deep-ocean samples. Reported activities include denitrification, nitrogen fixation, sulfur oxidation, and hydrocarbon degradation.

Nitrogen-fixing strains occur in the rhizosphere and in association with plants, including rice.

== Relevance ==
=== Health ===
Stutzerimonas stutzeri is an uncommon opportunistic human pathogen. Reported infections include bacteremia, peritonitis, endocarditis, meningitis, pneumonia, arthritis, and infections of bone, skin, the eye, and the urinary tract. Infection is frequently associated with underlying illness, surgery, or indwelling medical devices. One of the earliest documented infections involved an infected tibial fracture.

Clinical isolates vary in antimicrobial susceptibility. Reported resistance mechanisms include β-lactamases and changes in outer-membrane components; fluoroquinolone resistance associated with mutations in gyrA and parC has also been described.

=== Environmental ===
Some strains degrade organic pollutants or transform metals. Strain RCH2 reduces hexavalent chromium, whereas strain KC transforms carbon tetrachloride. Nitrogen-fixing strain A15 colonizes rice roots and has been studied for its interaction with the plant.

=== Microbiological ===
Several strains are competent for natural genetic transformation. Transformation is generally more frequent within a strain than between different strains or genomovars. The complete genome sequence of the highly transformable strain 28a24 has been reported.
