= Wayson stain =

Histologic stain method

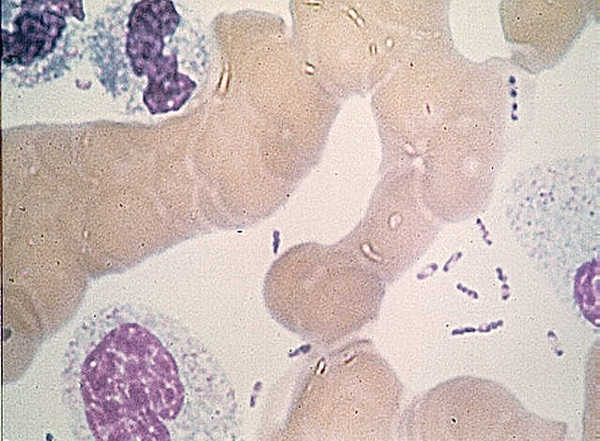
Blood smear taken from a patient with bubonic plague. Note the safety pin appearance of Yersinia pestis. Magnification ×1000. Wayson stain.

The Wayson stain is a basic fuchsin-methylene blue, ethyl alcohol-phenol microscopic staining procedure. It was originally a modified methylene blue stain used for diagnosing bubonic plague. With this stain, Yersinia pestis appears purple with a characteristic safety-pin appearance, which is due to the presence of a central vacuole.

Wayson stain is used along with the Giemsa and Wright's stains to rapidly detect potential biowarfare attacks. It has also been investigated as a possible cheaper and faster way to detect melioidosis. It is a useful alternative to the Gram or Loeffler's Methylene Blue stains, especially for detecting Yersinia enterocolitica which is often found in contaminated food.
