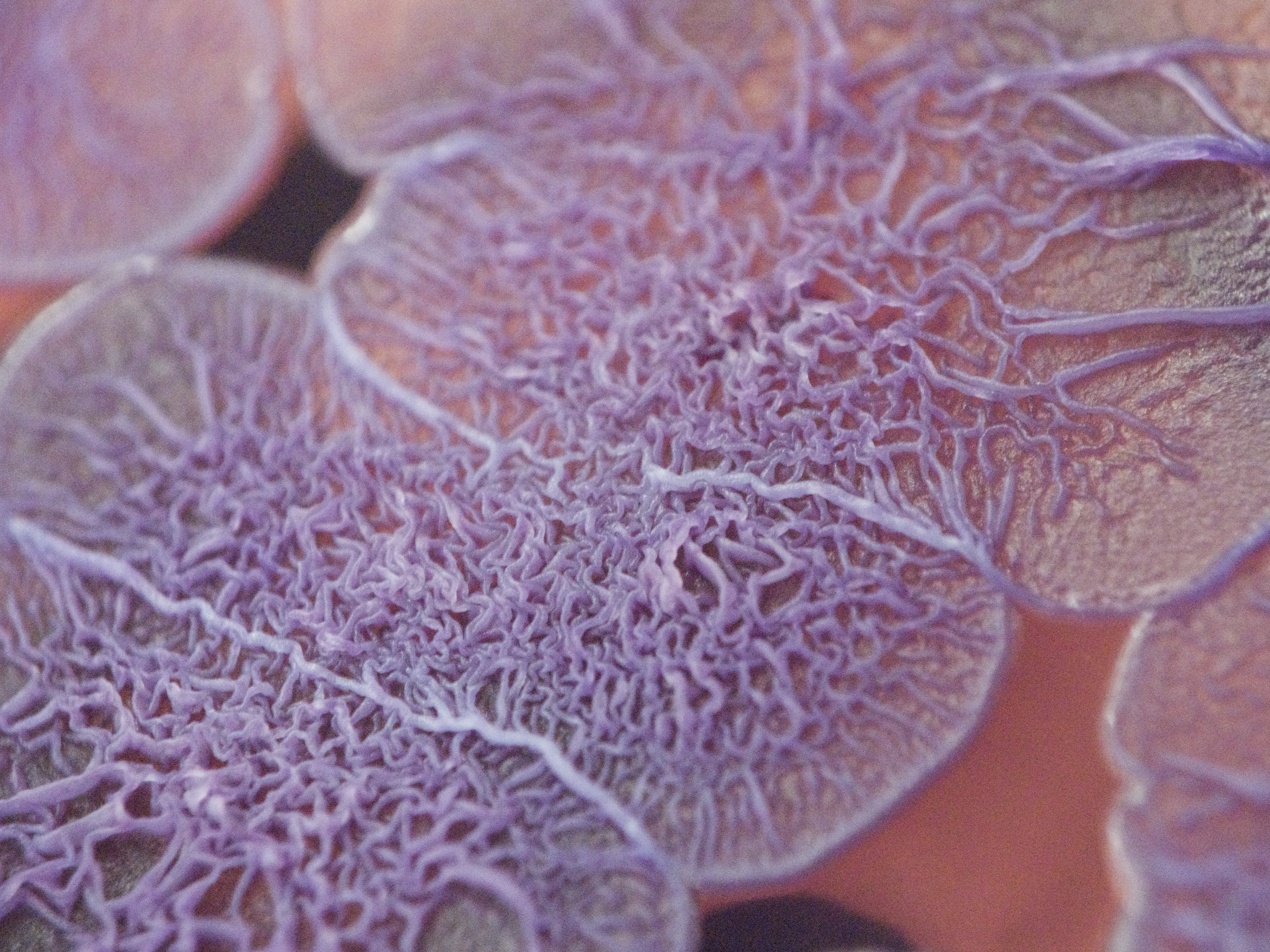
- Burkholderia thailandensis on Ashdown's media

Scientific classification
- Domain: Bacteria
- Kingdom: Pseudomonadati
- Phylum: Pseudomonadota
- Class: Betaproteobacteria
- Order: Burkholderiales
- Family: Burkholderiaceae
- Genus: Burkholderia
- Species: B. thailandensis

Binomial name
- Burkholderia thailandensis Brett et al. 1998

= Burkholderia thailandensis =

Species of bacterium

Burkholderia thailandensis is a nonfermenting motile, Gram-negative bacillus that occurs naturally in soil. It is closely related to Burkholderia pseudomallei, but unlike B. pseudomallei, it only rarely causes disease in humans or animals. The lethal inoculum is approximately 1000 times higher than for B. pseudomallei. It is usually distinguished from B. pseudomallei by its ability to assimilate arabinose. Other differences between these species include lipopolysaccharide composition, colony morphology, and differences in metabolism.

== Use in research ==
Burkholderia thailandensis is sometimes used to model B. pseudomallei infection in mice because of similarities in the immune response. B. thailandensis does not require biosafety category 3 facilities and is not considered a biosecurity threat, which makes it easier to study and to work with. Burkholderia thailandensis has secondary products that play an essential role in the ecology of soil bacteria. Co-culture studies showed that B. thailandensis strain E264 produces an antimicrobial substance that prevents the growth of other soil bacteria called Bacillus subtilis strain 168.

== Small RNA ==
Research suggests that as in other bacteria, small non coding RNAs play a role in response to the environmental and stress conditions like antibiotic exposure and survival in a host-specific environment. Several small RNA have been discovered in B. thailandenisis: BHT_s1 and BHT_s39 exhibit differential expression profiles dependent on growth phase and cell stimuli, such as antibiotics and serum. BHT_s39 could function in bacterial metabolism and adaptation to host. BTH_s13 and BTH_s19 may regulate expression of their downstream gene.
