= Burkholderia ambifaria =

Scientific classification
- Domain: Bacteria
- Kingdom: Pseudomonadati
- Phylum: Pseudomonadota
- Class: Betaproteobacteria
- Order: Burkholderiales
- Family: Burkholderiaceae
- Genus: Burkholderia
- Species: B. ambifaria

Binomial name
- Burkholderia ambifaria (Palleroni and Holmes 1981); Coenye et al. 2001

Species of bacterium

Burkholderia ambifaria is a species of Pseudomonadota.
