= Genomovar =

Burkholderian term for differentiation

Genomovar is a term commonly used within the genera Burkholderia and Agrobacterium to denote strains which are phylogenetically differentiable, but are phenotypically indistinguishable. A genomovar cannot be identified by standard biochemical tests, but it is classified as a species when a biochemical test allows it to be identified.
