= CsrB/RsmB RNA family =

Non-coding RNA molecule

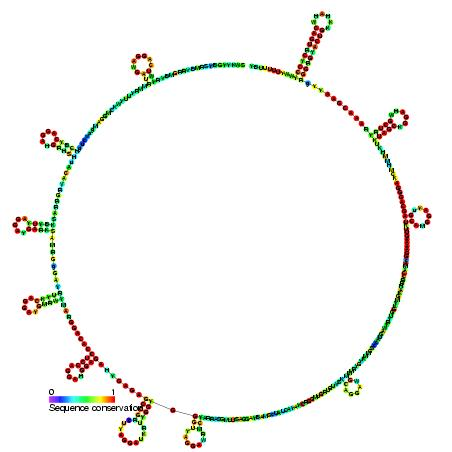
- Predicted secondary structure and sequence conservation of CsrB

Identifiers
- Symbol: CsrB
- Rfam: RF00018

Other data
- RNA type: Gene; sRNA
- Domain: Bacteria
- SO: SO:0000377
- PDB structures: PDBe

The CsrB RNA is a non-coding RNA that binds to approximately 9 to 10 dimers of the CsrA protein. The CsrB RNAs contain a conserved motif CAGGXXG that is found in up to 18 copies and has been suggested to bind CsrA.

CsrA regulates gene expression directly and indirectly by controlling the transcription elongation, translation, and RNA stability of its target RNAs. CsrB regulates the activity of CsrA by sequestering it from its regulatory targets and acting as a molecular sponge. For this reason, CsrA and its inhibitory small RNAs, including CsrB and CsrC, are referred to as the Csr system.

The Csr system has a strong negative regulatory effect on glycogen biosynthesis, gluconeogenesis and glycogen catabolism and a positive regulatory effect on glycolysis. In other bacteria such as Erwinia carotovora the RsmA protein has been shown to regulate the production of virulence determinants, such extracellular enzymes. RsmA binds to RsmB regulatory RNA which is also a member of this family.

RsmB RNA was shown to be upregulated by GacS/A system, and increase downstream T3SS gene expression. FlhDC, the master regulator of flagellar genes, also activates rsmB RNA production. A regulatory network have been revealed connecting rsmB, FlhDC and T3SS.

It has been shown to play role in the biocontrol activity of Rahnella aquatilis HX2 (a biocontrol agent producing antibacterial substance).

== See also ==
- CsrC RNA family
- PrrB/RsmZ RNA family
- RsmY RNA family
- RsmX
- RsmW sRNA
- CsrA protein
