= RsmX =

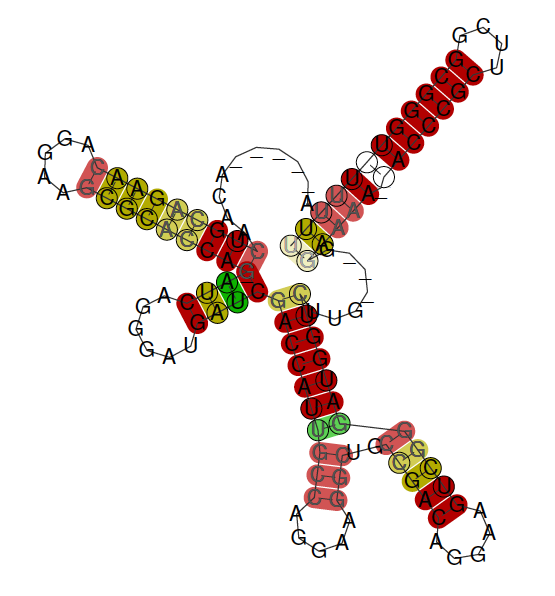
Secondary structure of the Pseudomonas RsmX ncRNA

The rsmX gene is part of the Rsm/Csr family of non-coding RNAs (ncRNAs). Members of the Rsm/Csr family are present in a diverse range of bacteria, including Escherichia coli, Erwinia, Salmonella, Vibrio and Pseudomonas. These ncRNAs act by sequestering translational repressor proteins, called RsmA, activating expression of downstream genes that would normally be blocked by the repressors. Sequestering of target proteins is dependent upon exposed GGA motifs in the stem loops of the ncRNAs. Typically, the activated genes are involved in secondary metabolism, biofilm formation and motility.

In Pseudomonas spp., three rsm ncRNAs have been identified. These are RsmX (approximately 115 nt), RsmY (approximately 120 nt) and RsmZ (approximately 145 nt). Expression of all three ncRNAs is population density dependent, with maximal expression occurring at the end of exponential phase. Further, expression of all three ncRNAs is dependent upon the response regulator, GacA, which activates transcription of the ncRNAs by binding a conserved upstream activating sequence (UAS) in the promoter region. Typically, pseudomonads contain a single copy of each of RsmY and RsmZ, however the copy number of RsmX is more variable. For example, P. aeruginosa contains no copies of RsmX and P. syringae pathovars contain five copies.

== See also ==
- CsrB/RsmB RNA family
- CsrC RNA family
- PrrB/RsmZ RNA family
- RsmY RNA family
- CsrA protein
