= CsrC RNA family =

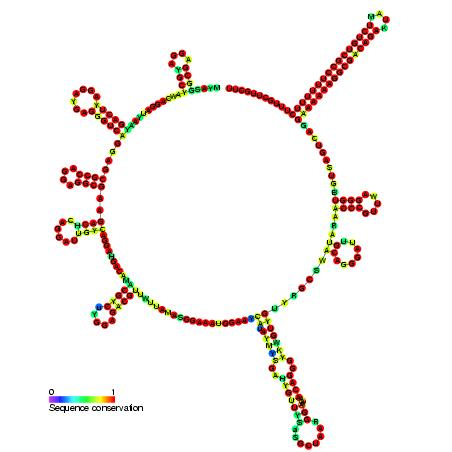
- Predicted secondary structure and sequence conservation of CsrC

Identifiers
- Symbol: CsrC
- Alt. Symbols: SraK
- Rfam: RF00084

Other data
- RNA type: Gene; sRNA
- Domain: Bacteria
- SO: SO:0000655
- PDB structures: PDBe

The 245 nucleotide Escherichia coli sRNA CsrC was discovered using a genetic screen for factors that regulate glycogen biosynthesis. CsrC RNA binds multiple copies of CsrA, a protein that post-transcriptionally regulates central carbon flux, biofilm formation and motility in E. coli. CsrC antagonises the regulatory effects of CsrA by sequestering this protein from its other RNA targets.

The discovery of CsrC is intriguing, in that a similar sRNA, CsrB, performs essentially the same function. Both sRNAs possess similar CsrA binding motifs (18 in CsrB and nine in CsrC), primarily localised in the loops of predicted hairpins. Transcription of csrC increases as the culture approaches the stationary phase of growth and is indirectly activated by CsrA via the response regulator UvrY (part of the BarA-UvrY two-component system). This RNA was also discovered in E. coli during a large scale genetic screen.

The levels of CsrB/C are controlled by its transcription by BarA-UvrY and its turnover by CsrD and RNase E. CsrD is a catalytically inactive GGDEF and EAL domain protein whose exact mechanism in CsrB/C turnover remains unknown.

== See also ==
- CsrB/RsmB RNA family
- PrrB/RsmZ RNA family
- RsmY RNA family
- RsmX
- CsrA protein
