= CsrA protein =

CsrA
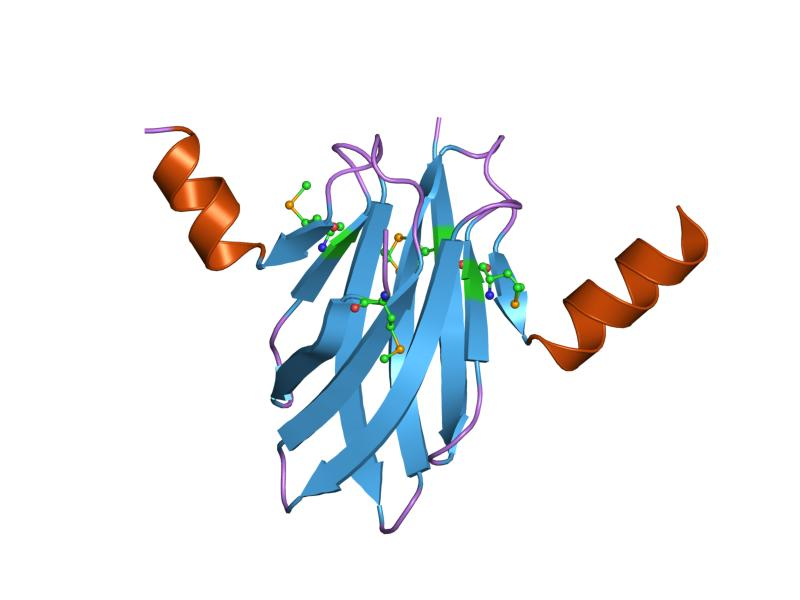
- CsrA dimer from Escherichia coli.

Identifiers
- Symbol: CsrA
- Pfam: PF02599
- InterPro: IPR003751
Available protein structures:
- PDB: IPR003751 PF02599 (ECOD; PDBsum)
- AlphaFold: IPR003751; PF02599

Carbon storage regulator A (CsrA) is an RNA-binding protein first identified in Escherichia coli, and its homologs are found in many bacterial species and pathogens. In pseudomonads, CsrA homologs are called repressor of secondary metabolites (i.e., RsmA, RsmE, and RsmF). CsrA proteins are post-transcriptional regulators of gene expression that bind to RNA targets, impacting their transcription, translation, and/or RNA stability. In the most commonly studied mechanism of regulation, CsrA binds to the Shine–Dalgarno sequence of a messenger RNA and inhibits translation initiation and facilitates mRNA decay.

Across different species, CsrA regulates glycogen biosynthesis and catabolism, glycolysis, biofilm formation, bacterial motility, quorum sensing, and virulence.

== RNA Interactions ==
A consensus secondary structure and primary sequence for the targets of the CsrA RNA binding protein.

Using SELEX, the high-affinity CsrA binding motif was identified as a "GGA" sequence located in the single-stranded region of a stem-loop. This binding motif was confirmed in E. coli and Salmonella using CLIP-seq. These studies identified hundreds of target RNAs, including mRNAs, sRNAs, and tRNAs.

CsrA activity is controlled by the expression of sRNAs such as CsrB, CsrC, RsmZ, RsmY, and RsmX that contain many copies of the CsrA binding motif. These RNAs sequester CsrA, which allows the translation (or other activity) of the previously inhibited bound mRNAs.
