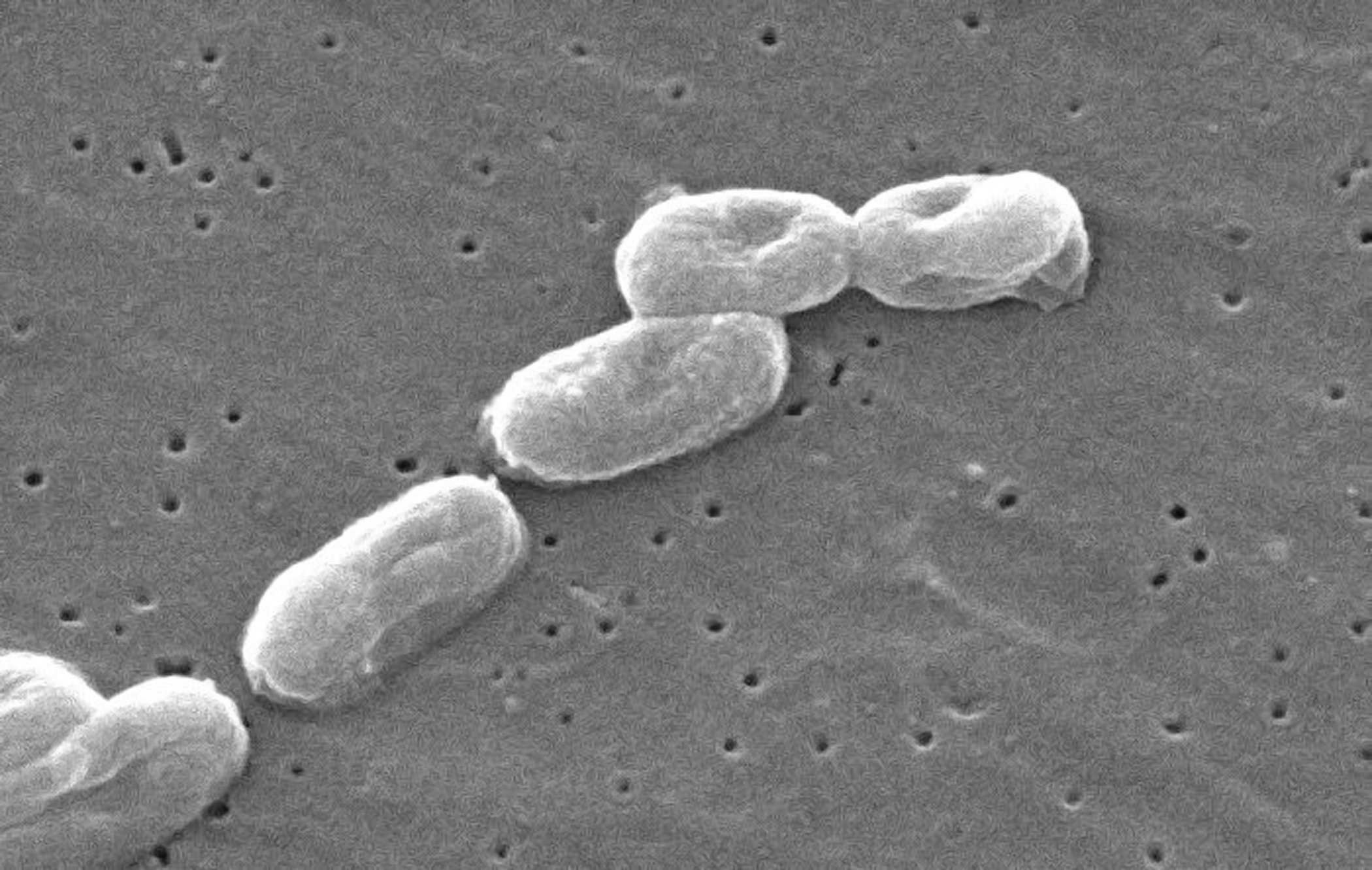

Scientific classification
- Domain: Bacteria
- Phylum: Pseudomonadota
- Class: Betaproteobacteria
- Order: Burkholderiales
- Family: Burkholderiaceae
- Genus: Burkholderia
- Species complex: B. cepacia complex

= Burkholderia cepacia complex =

Species of bacterium

Burkholderia cepacia complex (BCC) is a species complex consisting of Burkholderia cepacia and at least 20 different biochemically similar species of Gram-negative bacteria. They are catalase-producing and lactose-nonfermenting. Members of BCC are opportunistic human pathogens that most often cause pneumonia in immunocompromised individuals with underlying lung disease (such as cystic fibrosis or chronic granulomatous disease). Patients with sickle-cell haemoglobinopathies are also at risk. The species complex also attacks young onion and tobacco plants, and displays a remarkable ability to digest oil.

== Taxonomy ==
Burkholderia cepacia

Scientific classification
- Domain: Bacteria
- Kingdom: Pseudomonadati
- Phylum: Pseudomonadota
- Class: Betaproteobacteria
- Order: Burkholderiales
- Family: Burkholderiaceae
- Genus: Burkholderia
- Species: B. cepacia

Binomial name
- Burkholderia cepacia (Palleroni and Holmes 1981); Yabuuchi et al. 1993

Type strain
- * ATCC 25416 (Note: Also: CCUG 12691 and 13226; CFBP 2227; CIP 80.24; DSM 7288; HAMBI 1976; ICMP 5796; JCM 5964; LMG 1222; NBRC 14074; NCCB 76047; NCPPB 2993; NCTC 10743; NRRL B-14810)

Synonyms
- Pseudomonas cepacia Burkholder 1950; Pseudomonas multivorans Stanier et al. 1966; Pseudomonas cepacia (ex Burkholder 1950) Palleroni and Holmes 1981; Pseudomonas kingii Jonsson 1970

The group includes B. cepacia, B. multivorans, B. cenocepacia, B. vietnamiensis, B. stabilis, B. ambifaria, B. dolosa, B. anthina, B. pyrrocinia and B. ubonensis, among other species.

== Occurrence ==
BCC is resistant to a number of common disinfectants, specifically povidone-iodine, triclosan, chlorohexidine, cetylpyridinium chloride, and quaternary ammoniums such as benzalkonium chloride. Concentrations used as preservatives in water-based pharmaceutical products are often not enough to kill BCC or even stop it from proliferating. Even higher-concentration versions of these biocides intended for disinfection, such as povidone-iodine solution for wound dressing and benzonium chloride wipes, may harbor live BCC if not sterilized using another method.

Burkholderia cepacia is also found in marine environments (marine sponges) and some strains of Burkholderia cepacia can tolerate high salinity. S.I. Paul et al. (2021) isolated and biochemically characterized salt tolerant strains of Burkholderia cepacia from marine sponges of Saint Martin's Island of the Bay of Bengal, Bangladesh.

== Human infection ==
=== Pathogenesis ===
BCC organisms are typically found in water and soil and can survive for prolonged periods in moist environments. They show a relatively poor virulence. Virulence factors include adherence to plastic surfaces (including those of medical devices) and production of several enzymes such as elastase and gelatinase. Also relevant might be their ability to survive attacks from neutrophils.

Person-to-person spread has been documented; as a result, many hospitals, clinics, and camps have enacted strict isolation precautions for those infected with BCC. Infected individuals are often treated in a separate area from uninfected patients to limit spread, since BCC infection can lead to a rapid decline in lung function and result in death.

BCC infection is a contraindication for lung transplantation and cystic fibrosis patients infected with BCC may be excluded from transplantation due to the increased mortality. Additionally, lung transplant recipients infected with B. cenocepacia are six times more likely to die within a year of transplantation than those infected with other BCC organisms.

=== Diagnosis ===
Diagnosis of BCC involves culturing the bacteria from clinical specimens, such as sputum or blood. BCC organisms are naturally resistant to many common antibiotics, including aminoglycosides and polymyxin B. and this fact is exploited in the identification of the organism. The organism is usually cultured in Burkholderia cepacia agar (BC agar), which contains crystal violet and bile salts to inhibit the growth of Gram-positive cocci, and ticarcillin and polymyxin B to inhibit the growth of other Gram-negative bacilli. It also contains phenol red pH indicator which turns pink when it reacts with alkaline byproducts generated by the bacteria when it grows.

Alternatively, oxidation-fermentation polymyxin-bacitracin-lactose (OFPBL) agar can be used. OFPBL contains polymyxin (which kills most Gram-negative bacteria, including Pseudomonas aeruginosa) and bacitracin (which kills most Gram-positive bacteria and Neisseria species). It also contains lactose, and organisms such as BCC that do not ferment lactose turn the pH indicator yellow, which helps to distinguish it from other organisms that may grow on OFPBL agar, such as Candida species, Pseudomonas fluorescens, and Stenotrophomonas species.

=== Treatment ===
Treatment typically includes multiple antibiotics and may include ceftazidime, minocycline, piperacillin, meropenem, chloramphenicol, and trimethoprim/sulfamethoxazole (co-trimoxazole). Although co-trimoxazole has been generally considered the drug of choice for B. cepacia infections, ceftazidime, minocycline, piperacillin, and meropenem are considered to be viable alternative options in cases where co-trimoxazole cannot be administered because of hypersensitivity reactions, intolerance, or resistance. Newer beta-lactam / beta-lactamase combinations like ceftazidime-avibactam or ceftolozane-tazobactam can also be effective. BCC is intrinsically resistant to colistin and usually resistant to aminoglycosides.

In people with cystic fibrosis, evidence is insufficient regarding the effectiveness of long-term antibiotic treatment with continuous inhaled aztreonam lysine (AZLI) in terms of lung function or chest infections.

== History ==
B. cepacia was discovered by Walter Burkholder in 1949 as the cause of onion skin rot, and first described as a human pathogen in the 1950s. It was first isolated in patients with cystic fibrosis (CF) in 1977, when it was known as Pseudomonas cepacia. In the 1980s, outbreaks of B. cepacia in individuals with CF were associated with a 35% death rate. B. cepacia has a large genome, containing twice the amount of genetic material as E. coli.

On 8 August 2025 a voluntary recall was issued by DermaRite Industries for certain of its hand soap products contaminated with the bacteria complex (exact species not specified); risk of sepsis in the immunocompromised was particularly noted.

== See also ==
- Contamination control
- Povidone-iodine (contamination by BCC)
