= Environmental impact of paper =

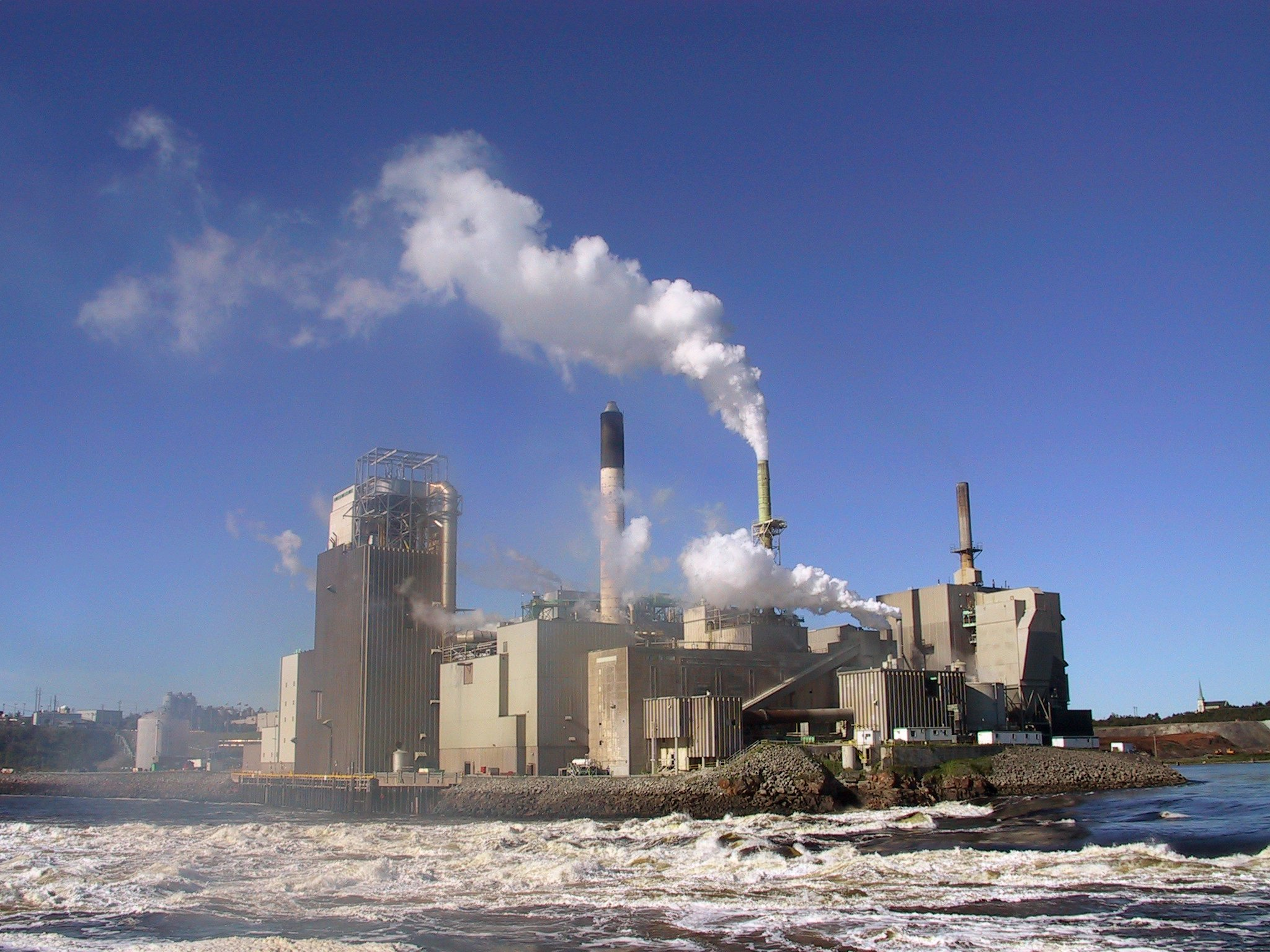
A pulp and paper mill in New Brunswick, Canada. Although pulp and paper manufacturing requires large amounts of energy, a portion of it comes from burning wood residue.

The environmental impact of paper is significant. This has led to changes in industry and behaviour at both business and personal levels. With the use of modern technology such as the printing press and the highly mechanized harvesting of wood, disposable paper became a relatively cheap commodity, which led to a high level of consumption and waste. The rise in global environmental issues such as air and water pollution, climate change, overflowing landfills and clearcutting have all led to increased government regulations. There is now a trend towards sustainability in the pulp and paper industry as it moves to reduce clearcutting, water use, greenhouse gas emissions, and fossil fuel consumption and to clean up its influence on local water supplies and air pollution.

Environmental product declarations or product scorecards are available to collect and evaluate the environmental and social performance of paper products, such as the Paper Calculator, Environmental Paper Assessment Tool (EPAT), or Paper Profile.

Both the U.S. and Canada generate interactive maps of environmental indicators which show pollution emissions of individual facilities.

== Issues ==
Pulp and paper mills contribute to air, water and land pollution. Discarded paper and paperboard make up roughly 26% of solid municipal waste in landfill sites.

Pulp and paper generate the third largest amount of industrial air, water, and land emissions in Canada and the sixth largest in the United States. In 2015, the industry released 174,000 tonnes of emissions to air, water and land, or 5.3% out of a total of 3.3 million tonnes of emissions released by all industries in Canada. In the United States the pulp and paper industry released about 79,000 tonnes or about 5% of all industrial pollutant releases in 2015

Worldwide, the pulp and paper industry is the fifth largest consumer of energy, accounting for four percent of all the world's energy use. However, the entire paper and printing sector contributes less than 1% to the global greenhouse gas inventory due to the very high use of renewable energy, mostly biomass.

The pulp and paper industry uses more water to produce a ton of product than any other industry.

The de-inking process during paper recycling is also a source of emissions due to chemicals released in the effluent. The European Recovered Paper Council has developed a "deinkability scorecard" which identifies the printed paper products which have the best recyclability when they are deinked.

Much of the wood harvested in North America goes into lumber and other non-paper products. In the U.S., 36% of the timber harvest is used for paper and paperboard and in Canada 21% comes directly from harvested trees. The rest comes from sawmill residues (55%) and recycled paper (24%).

Deforestation is often seen as a problem in developing countries, but also occurs in the developed world. Woodchipping to produce paper pulp is a contentious environmental issue in Australia. In the 1990s, the New Zealand government stopped the export of woodchips from native forests after campaigning by environmentalists.

Over 6.5 million trees were cut down to make 16 billion paper cups used by US consumers for coffee alone in 2006, using 4 billion US gallons (15,000,000 m^{3}) of water and resulting in 253 million pounds (115,000 tonnes) of waste. Overall, North Americans use 58% of all paper cups, amounting to 130 billion cups.

=== Air pollution ===
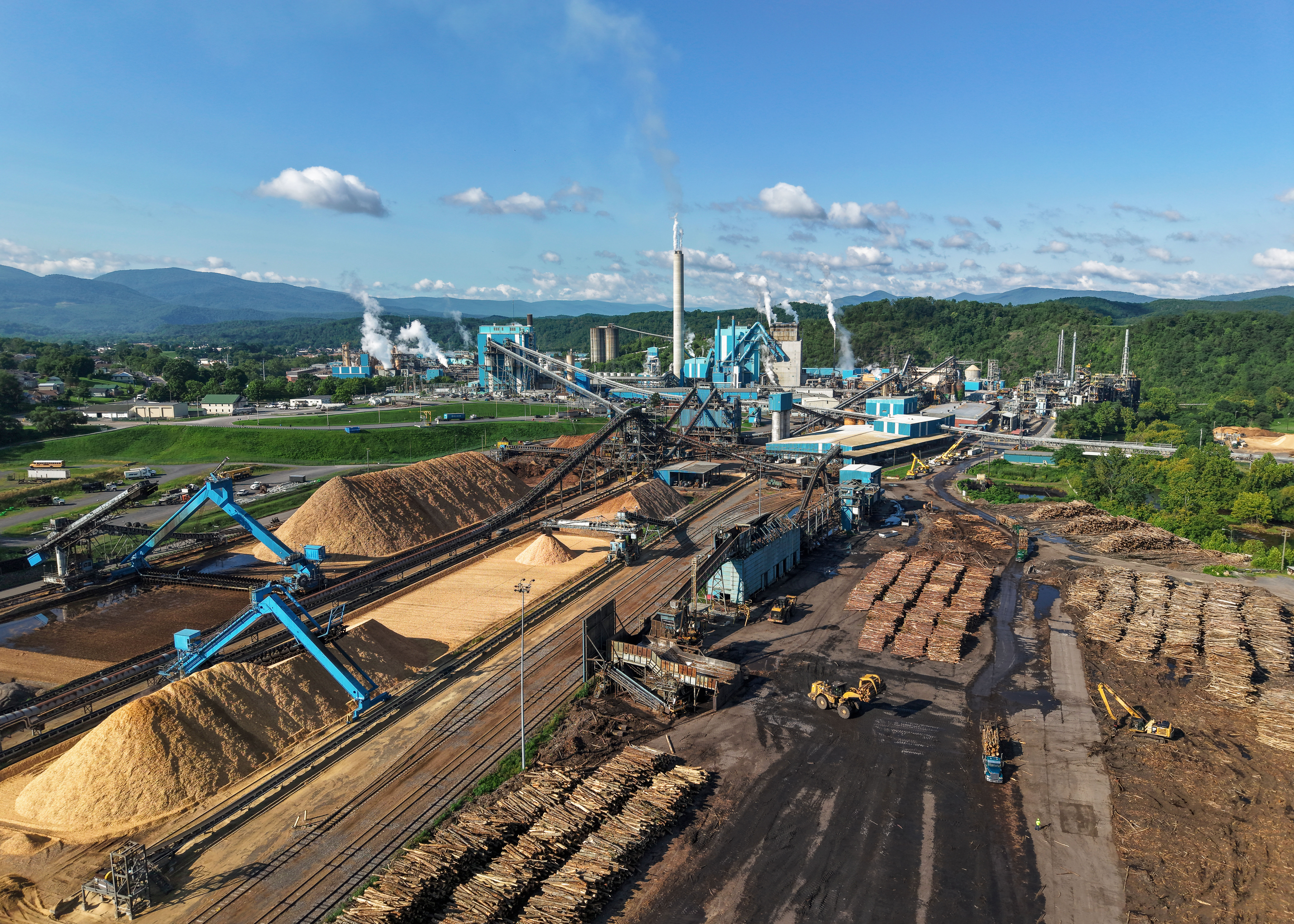
The Smurfit Westrock kraft paper mill in Covington, Virginia is the largest climate polluter in the U.S. paper industry

The National Emissions Inventory in the U.S. and the Air Pollutant Emission Inventory (APEI) in Canada compile annual statistics on emissions of air pollutants that contribute to smog, acid rain, greenhouse gases and diminished air quality including particulate matter (PM), sulphur oxides (SO_{x}), nitrogen oxides (NO_{x}), cadmium, lead, mercury, and persistent organic pollutants (POPs) such as dioxins and furan, hexachlorobenzene (HCB), and polycyclic aromatic hydrocarbons (PAH). In addition, the Toxics Release Inventory (TRI) is a publicly available database maintained by the EPA's TRI Program that tracks the management in the U.S. of certain toxic chemicals that may pose a threat to human health and the environment.

In the U.S., total industrial releases of toxic waste into the air were 690 million pounds (313,000 tonnes) in 2015 and pulp and paper accounted for 20%. Of the releases to air by the pulp and paper industry, 60% were methanol, which is not a persistent, bioaccumulative, and toxic (PBT) chemical and is not a carcinogen. Several PBTs are emitted by the pulp and paper industry at measurable levels, including lead, hexachlorobenzene (HCB), dioxins, furans and polycyclic aromatic hydrocarbons. In Canada emissions of these chemicals by the industry were less than 2% of total emissions in 2015. In the U.S., the pulp and paper industry accounted for 22% of total HCB emissions but other PBT emissions were under 2% of national totals.

There are other important releases to air by the pulp and paper industry. Fine particulate matter (PM_{2.5}) consists of particles 2.5 microns in diameter or less, which can penetrate the respiratory system and have a serious effect on health. The pulp and paper industry in the U.S. and Canada is responsible for roughly 10% of the industrial releases of PM_{2.5}. However, the majority of PM_{2.5} in the air comes from non-industrial sources such as residential wood combustion, construction, and dust from unpaved roads; when these sources are taken into account, the pulp and paper industry in North America produced only about 0.5% of the total in 2014.

Nitrogen oxides (NO_{x}) sulfur oxides (SO_{x}) and carbon dioxide (CO_{2}) are all emitted during pulp and paper manufacturing. NOx and SOx are major contributors to acid rain, and CO_{2} is a greenhouse gas responsible for climate change. In 2014, the pulp and paper industry in North America was responsible for about 0.5% of the total SO_{x} and NO_{x} releases from industrial and non-industrial sources.

=== Water pollution ===
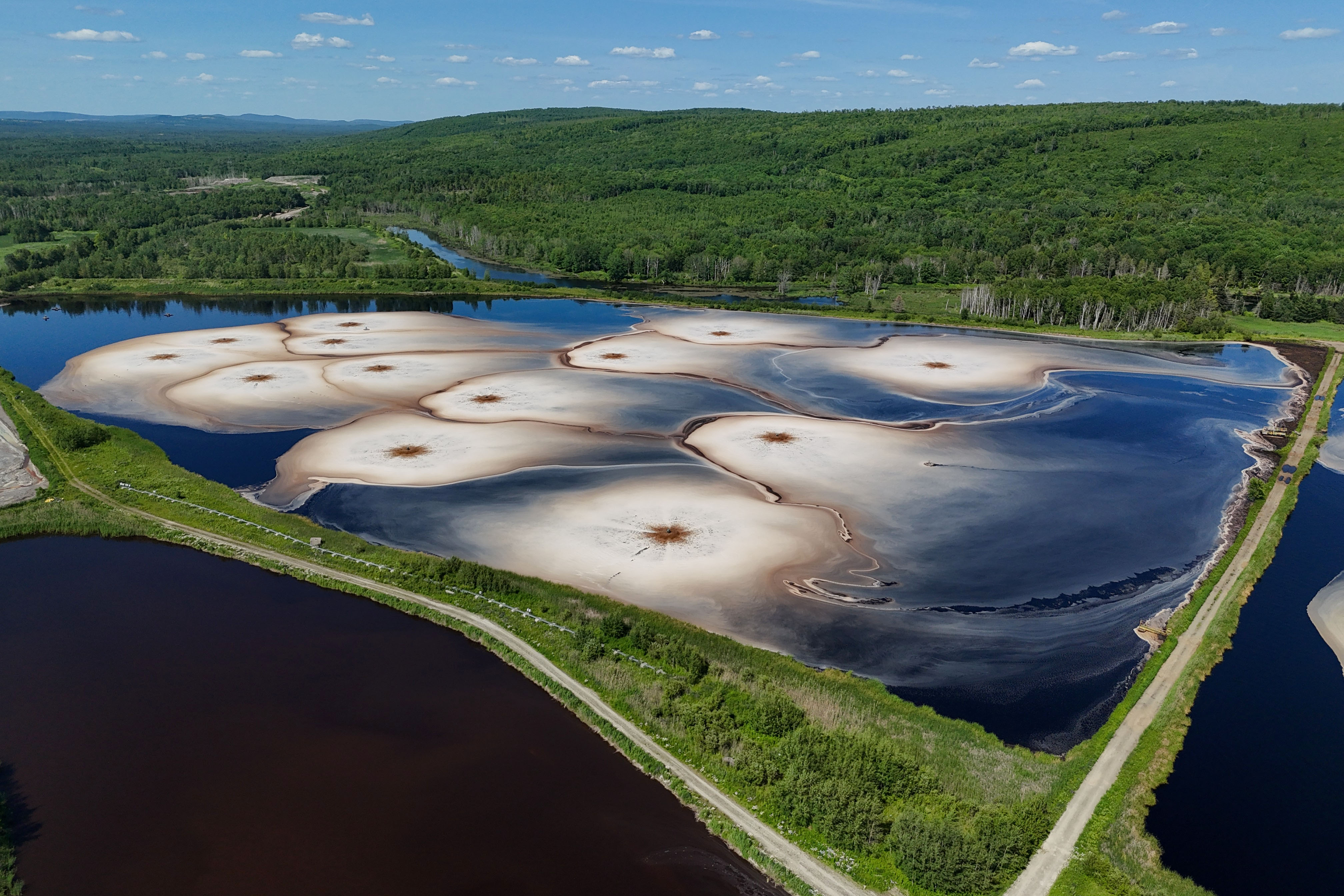
Aerated treatment lagoon with surface aerators

Wastewater discharges from a pulp and paper mill contain solids, nutrients and dissolved organic matter such as lignin. They also contain alcohols, chelating agents and inorganic materials like chlorates and transition metal compounds. Nutrients such as nitrogen and phosphorus can cause or exacerbate eutrophication of fresh water bodies such as lakes and rivers. Organic matter dissolved in fresh water, measured by biological oxygen demand (BOD), changes ecological characteristics. Wastewater may also be polluted with organochlorine compounds. Some of these occur naturally in the wood, but chlorine bleaching of the pulp produces far larger amounts. Recent studies underline appropriate pre-treatment of the wastewater (e.g. coagulation) as a cost-effective solution for the removal of Chemical Oxygen Demand (COD) and the reduction of the pressure on the aquatic environment.

In Canada, the pulp and paper industry released 5% of the total industrial waste disposed of to water in 2015. In 2014, 97.5%, 99.9% and 99.8% of effluent samples from pulp and paper mills met regulatory requirements for toxicity tests on fish, biochemical oxygen demand, and total suspended solids, respectively.

The pulp and paper industry also produces important emissions of heavy metals. In Canada, for example, this industry is the third source of lead (Pb) emissions to water In the U.S., the pulp and paper industry is responsible for 9% of industrial releases to water. In 2015, the pulp and paper sector was ranked first in the amount of toxic weighted pound equivalents (TWPE) discharged to water by industry. Over 92% of this TWPE came from hydrogen sulphide, dioxin and dioxin-like compounds and manganese (Mn) and manganese compounds. Seven pulp and paper facilities accounted for 80% of the hydrogen sulphide discharged, and five facilities accounted for 93% of the dioxin discharged out of a total of 226 facilities. The last time the EPA reviewed Mn and Mn compounds (2006) it concluded that discharges were below treatable levels. Levels of discharge have not changed significantly since that time.

Discharges can also discolour the water, making it ugly. This has happened in the Tarawera River in New Zealand, which became known as the "black drain".

=== Paper waste ===
In the United States, discarded paper and paperboard make up roughly 26% (or 67 million tons) of the 258 million tons of solid municipal waste generated in 2014 and over 14% of the 136 million tons solid municipal waste that ended up in landfills in 2014. Paper waste, like other wastes, produces the additional hazard of toxic inks, dyes and polymers that might be carcinogenic when incinerated, or commingled with groundwater by traditional burial methods such as modern landfills. Paper recycling mitigates this impact, but not the environmental and economic impact of the energy consumed by manufacturing, transporting and burying and/or reprocessing paper products.

=== Chlorine and chlorine-based materials ===
Chlorine and compounds of chlorine are used in the bleaching of wood pulp, especially chemical pulps produced by the kraft process or sulfite process. In the past, plants using elemental chlorine produced significant quantities of dioxins, persistent and very toxic organic pollutants. From the 1990s onward, the use of elemental chlorine in the delignification process was substantially reduced and replaced with ECF (Elemental Chlorine Free) and TCF (Totally Chlorine Free) bleaching processes. As a result, dioxin production was also significantly reduced.

In 2005, elemental chlorine was used in 19–20% of kraft pulp production globally, down from over 90% in 1990. 75% of kraft pulp used ECF, with the remaining 5–6% using TCF. A study based on U.S. Environmental Protection Agency (EPA) data concluded that "Studies of effluents from mills that use oxygen delignification and extended delignification to produce ECF (elemental chlorine free) and TCF pulps suggest that the environmental effects of these processes are low and similar." Most TCF pulp is produced in Sweden and Finland for sale in Germany, all markets with a high level of environmental awareness. In 1999, TCF pulp represented 25% of the European market.

TCF bleaching, by removing chlorine from the process, reduces chlorinated organic compounds to background levels in pulp mill effluent. ECF bleaching can substantially reduce but not fully eliminate chlorinated organic compounds, including dioxins, from effluent. While modern ECF plants can achieve chlorinated organic compounds (AOX) emissions of less than 0.05 kg per tonne of pulp produced, most do not achieve this level of emissions. Within the EU, the average chlorinated organic compound emissions for ECF plants is 0.15 kg per tonne.

However, there has been disagreement about the comparative environmental effects of ECF and TCF bleaching. On the one hand, paper and chemical industry-funded studies have generally found that there is no environmental difference between ECF and TCF effluents. On the other hand, an independent peer-reviewed study has found that, comparing conventional, ECF and TCF effluents before and after secondary treatment, "TCF effluents are the least toxic."

=== Sulfur, hydrogen sulfide and sulfur dioxide ===
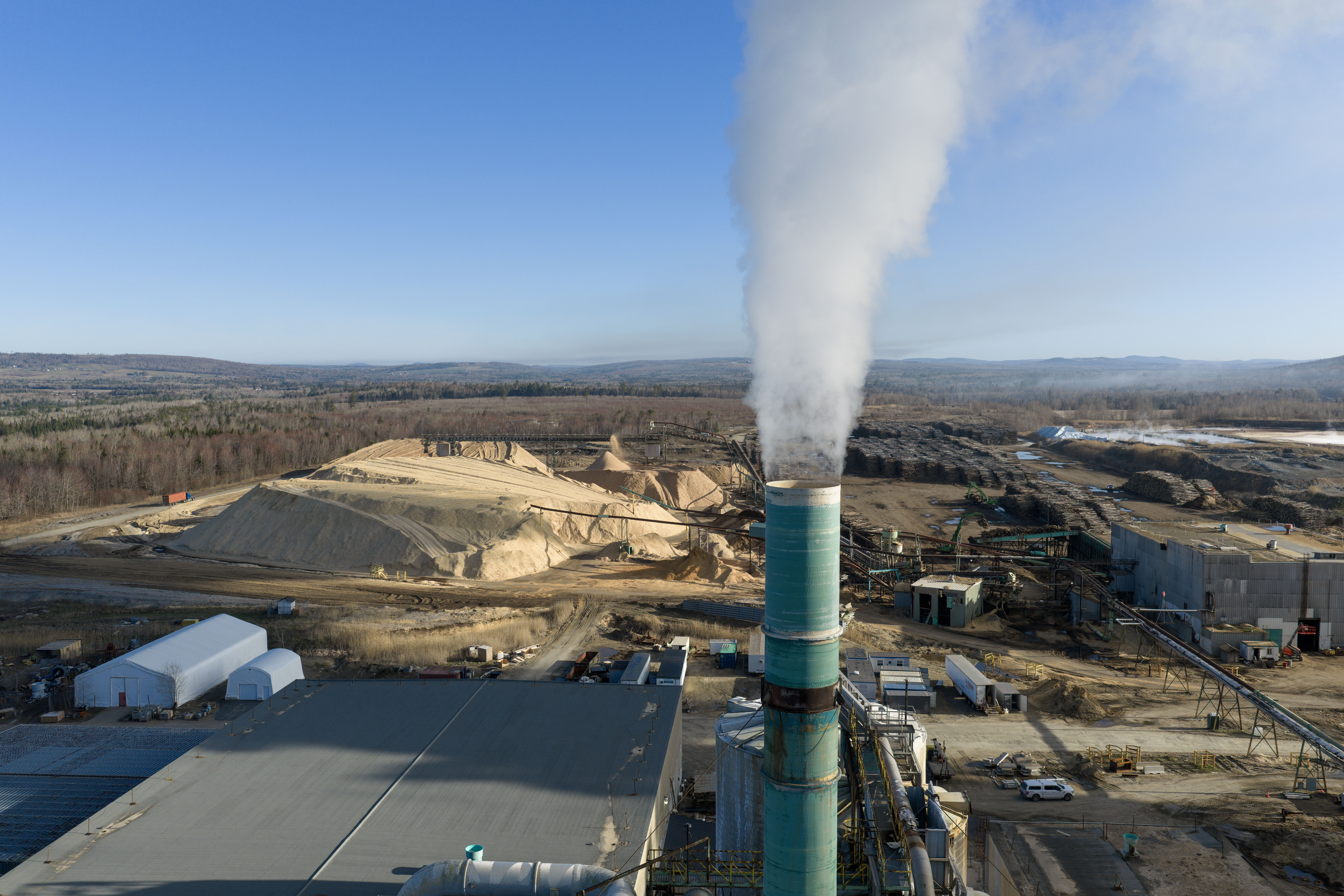
Steam plume from a boiler stack

Sulfur-based compounds are used in both the kraft process and the sulfite process for making wood pulp. Sulfur is generally recovered, with the exception of ammonia-based sulfite processes, but some is released as sulfur dioxide during combustion of black liquor, a byproduct of the kraft process, or "red liquor" from the sulfite process. Sulfur dioxide is of particular concern because it is water-soluble and is a major cause of acid rain. In 2006 the pulp and paper industry in Canada released about 60,000 tonnes of sulfur oxides (SOx) into the atmosphere, accounting for just over 4% of the total SOx emission from all Canadian industries.

A modern kraft pulp mill is more than self-sufficient in its electrical generation and normally will provide a net flow of energy to the local electrical grid. Additionally, bark and wood residues are often burned in a separate power boiler to generate steam.

Air emissions of hydrogen sulfide, methyl mercaptan, dimethyl sulfide, dimethyl disulfide, and other volatile sulfur compounds are the cause of the odor characteristic of pulp mills utilizing the kraft process. Other chemicals that are released into the air and water from most paper mills include the following:

- carbon monoxide
- ammonia
- nitrogen oxide
- mercury
- nitrates
- methanol
- benzene
- volatile organic compounds, chloroform.

Bleaching mechanical pulp is not a major cause for environmental concern since most of the organic material is retained in the pulp, and the chemicals used (hydrogen peroxide and sodium dithionite) produce benign byproducts (water and, eventually, sodium sulfate, respectively).

However, the bleaching of chemical pulps has the potential to cause significant environmental damage, primarily through the release of organic materials into waterways. Pulp mills are almost always located near large bodies of water because they require substantial quantities of water for their processes. An increased public awareness of environmental issues from the 1970s and 1980s, as evidenced by the formation of organizations like Greenpeace, influenced the pulping industry and governments to address the release of these materials into the environment. Environmental NGO pressure was especially intense on Swedish and Finnish pulp and paper companies.

Conventional bleaching using elemental chlorine produces and releases into the environment large amounts of chlorinated organic compounds, including chlorinated dioxins. Dioxins are recognized as a persistent environmental pollutant, regulated internationally by the Stockholm Convention on Persistent Organic Pollutants.

Dioxins are highly toxic, and health effects on humans include reproductive, developmental, immune and hormonal problems. They are known to be carcinogenic. Over 90% of human exposure is through food, primarily meat, dairy, fish and shellfish, as dioxins accumulate in the food chain in the fatty tissue of animals.

=== Greenhouse gas emissions ===
Globally, 69% of greenhouse gas emissions come from the energy and transportation industries. The global print and paper industry accounts for about 1% of global carbon dioxide emissions. Recent bottom-up analysis across 30 major countries estimated that domestic paper-related sectors accounted for about 3.2% of global anthropogenic greenhouse-gas emissions over 1961–2019, and outlined net-zero pathways to 2050 centered on energy-efficiency improvements and energy-system decarbonization.

Greenhouse gas emissions from the pulp and paper industry are generated from the combustion of fossil fuels required for raw material production and transportation, wastewater treatment facilities, purchased power, paper transportation, printed product transportation, disposal and recycling.

Disposing of paper in landfill sites, and subsequent breakdown and production of methane (a potent greenhouse gas) also adds to the carbon footprint of paper products. This is another reason why paper recycling is beneficial for the environment. Paper recovery, instead of landfilling can reduce the global warming potential of paper products by 15 to 25%.

At pulp and paper mills in the U.S., the GHG emission rate expressed in tons of carbon dioxide equivalents per ton of production has been reduced by 55.8% since 1972, 23.1% since 2000, and 3.9% compared to 2010. Between 2005 and 2012, U.S. pulp and paper mill purchased energy (from fossil fuels) use per ton of production has been reduced by 8.8%.

In Canada, between 2000 and 2012, direct GHG emissions declined by 56% and total energy use by 30%. Some of this decline is due to the contraction of the forest industry but a large part is due to reduced use of fossil fuels and increased self-generation of power from renewable biomass. Bioenergy accounted for 56% of forest industry energy use in 2012, up from 49% in 2000.

=== Non-renewable resources ===
Clay or calcium carbonate are used as fillers for some papers. Kaolin is the most commonly used clay for coated papers.

=== Tree invasive species ===
Trees particularly suited for pulp production have been introduced in various regions worldwide. Some of those have now come to be recognized as aggressive invasive species. In Malaysia, the Acacia auriculaeformis and Acacia mangium are counted as invasive trees. The fast-growing and highly profitable eucalyptus must be regarded an invasive species in various part of the world.

== Mitigation ==
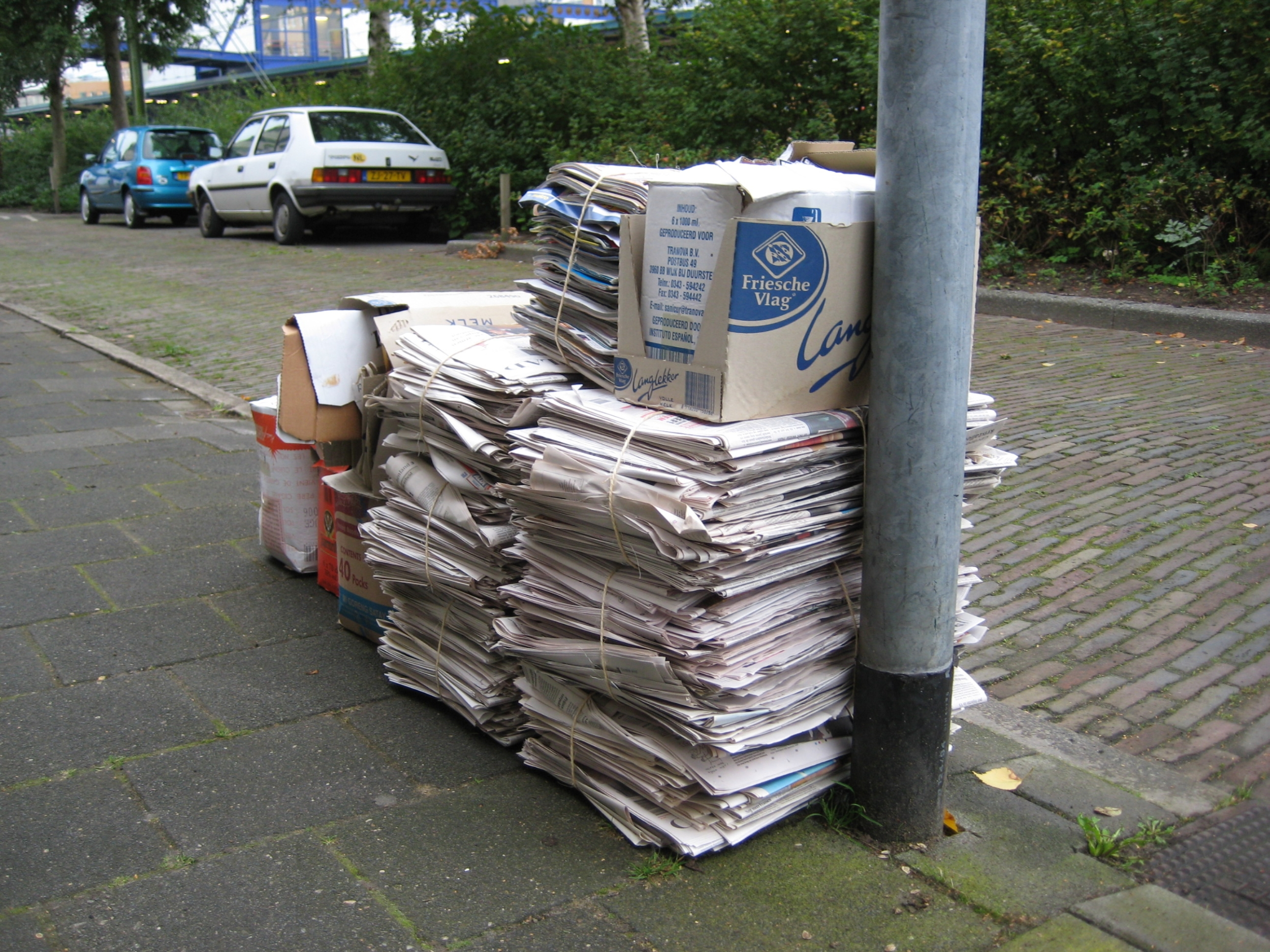
Waste paper awaiting recycling in the Netherlands.

Some of the environmental impacts of the pulp and paper industry have been addressed and there is movement towards sustainable practices. Using wood from plantation forests addresses concerns about loss of old growth forests.

=== Sustainable forest management ===
Cutting down trees to make forest products such as pulp and paper creates temporary or long-term environmental disturbances in forest habitats depending on how carefully the harvest is carried out. There might be impacts on plant and animal biodiversity, soil fertility and water quality. However, sustainable forest management practices are a way of using and caring for forests so as to maintain their environmental, social and economic values and benefits over time.

In the U.S., increasing demand for responsibly produced paper provides a financial incentive for landowners to keep their land forested and manage it in a sustainable way - rather than selling it for industrial or housing developments, a primary cause of deforestation in the U.S., according to the U.S. Forest Service. This managed land, in turn, provides a host of continuing eco-system services, from clean water, healthy soil and climate change mitigation to recreational opportunities and aesthetic beauty.

In Canada, sustainable forest management is supported by a forest management planning process; a science-based approach to decision-making, assessment and planning as well as by regulations and policies.

==== Forest certification ====
Promoting and supporting forest certification and the ability to trace the origin of wood fiber helps ensure sustainable forest management and legal logging. The forest certification systems that are currently the most used are:

- The Program for the Endorsement of Forest Certification (PEFC), in most European countries as well as growing in other regions of the world.
- The Sustainable Forestry Initiative (SFI),
- The American Tree Farm System (ATFS)
- Canadian Standards Association (CSA).
- The Forest Stewardship Council (FSC).

=== Pulp bleaching ===
The move to non-elemental chlorine for the bleaching process reduced the emission of the carcinogenic organochlorines. Peracetic acid, ozone and hydrogen peroxide and oxygen are used in bleaching sequences in the pulp industry to produce totally chlorine free (TCF) paper.

=== Recycling ===
There are three categories of paper that can be used as feedstocks for making recycled paper: mill broke, pre-consumer waste, and post-consumer waste. Mill broke is paper trimmings and other paper scrap from the manufacture of paper, and is recycled internally in a paper mill. Pre-consumer waste is material that was discarded before it was ready for consumer use. Post-consumer waste is material discarded after consumer use such as old magazines, old telephone directories, and residential mixed paper.

One concern about recycling wood pulp paper is that the fibers are degraded with each and after being recycled four or five times the fibers become too short and weak to be useful in making paper.

EPA has found that recycling causes 35% less water pollution and 74% less air pollution than making virgin paper. Pulp mills can be sources of both air and water pollution, especially if they are producing bleached pulp. Recycling paper decreases the demand for virgin pulp and thus reduces the overall amount of air and water pollution associated with paper manufacture. Recycled pulp can be bleached with the same chemicals used to bleach virgin pulp, but hydrogen peroxide and sodium hydrosulfite are the most common bleaching agents. Recycled pulp, or paper made from it, is known as PCF (process chlorine free) if no chlorine-containing compounds were used in the recycling process.

=== Recycled paper and paper mills ===
Recycling as an alternative to the use of landfills and recycled paper is one of the less complicated procedures in the recycling industry. Although there is not a landfill crisis at this point in time, it is commonly believed that measures should be taken in order to lower the negative impacts of landfills, for many hazardous elements are produced and spread because of this enclosure of trash. Most recycled paper is priced higher than freshly made paper, and this tends to play a deciding factor for the consumer. Because most of the recycled pulp is purchased in an open market, virgin paper is produced cheaper with the pulp that was made by the specific paper mill. Virgin paper contains no recycled content and is made directly from the pulp of trees or cotton. Materials recovered after the initial paper manufacturing process are considered recycled paper. Because that original standard was so vague, some "recycled papers" contained only mill scraps that would have been included in virgin paper anyway. Standards have recently been set to prevent companies from making it seem like they were selling recycled paper. The collection and recycling industries have fixated on the scraps of paper that is thrown away by customers daily in order to increase the amount of recycled paper. Different paper mills are structured for different types of paper, and most "recovered office paper can be sent to a deinking mill". A deinking mill serves as a step in the recycling paper process. This type of mill detaches the ink from the paper fibers, along with any other excess materials which are also removed from the remaining paper. In the deinking mill, after all of the unwanted coatings of paper are stripped, the refurbished paper is sent to the paper machine. The old scraps are now constructed into new paper at the paper machine. Many papers mills have recycled business papers by transforming the old business papers into beneficial letters and envelopes. The production process for recycled paper is more costly than the well-developed paper mills that create paper with the use of trees. This process in making recycled paper is also much more time-consuming. However, recycled paper has a multitude of benefits from an environmental perspective.

=== Regulations ===
Pulp and paper is a heavily regulated industry in North America. U.S. and Canadian regulations are summarized below.

==== United States ====
===== Air and water pollution =====
EPA first issued national wastewater standards, known as effluent guidelines, for pulp and paper mills in 1974, pursuant to the Clean Water Act. The agency established numeric limitations for several conventional pollutants. In 1982, EPA amended the regulations with numeric limitations for pentachlorophenol, trichlorophenol and zinc. Effluent limitations are implemented in National Pollutant Discharge Elimination System (NPDES) permits, which are renewed every five years. (See United States regulation of point source water pollution.)

EPA's 1998 "Cluster Rule" (CR) addressed additional toxic wastewater pollutants, and regulated hazardous air pollutant emissions as well. Because both air and water regulations were addressed in the same rulemaking action, EPA made it possible for pulp and paper mills to select the best combination of air and water pollution prevention technologies rather than addressing one at a time. Some of the requirements and technologies were designed to reduce toxic air pollutants also reduced toxic wastewater pollutants and vice versa. EPA's intent in promulgating the CR was to provide a coordinated set of regulatory requirements, thereby improving clarity for industry as it worked to achieve compliance, and achieving a greater level of pollution prevention.

The air emission regulations in the CR, a component of the National Emissions Standards for Hazardous Air Pollutants (NESHAP) under the Clean Air Act, became effective in 2001. The regulations, also known as "Maximum Achievable Control Technology" (MACT) regulations, apply to mills that use chemical pulping and call for hazardous air pollutants to be reduced by 59% and for volatile organic carbon and particulate matter to be reduced by 49% and 37%, respectively. The wastewater regulations in the CR apply to mills that combine chlorine bleaching with kraft chemical pulping and aim to reduce dioxins, furans, and chloroform discharges by 96%, 96%, and 99%, respectively. EPA added numeric effluent limitations for 12 chlorinated phenolic pollutants and adsorbable organic halides (AOX). The regulation also requires the industry to implement best management practices, such as process control monitoring.

All air emissions in the U.S. are regulated at the federal level. The Clean Air Act establishes National Ambient Air Quality Standards (NAAQS) for pollutants harmful to public health and the environment. Standards have been set for six principal pollutants: lead, carbon monoxide, nitrogen dioxide (NO_{2}), ozone (O_{3}), particulate matter (PM) and sulfur dioxide (SO_{2}). EPA revised the NESHAP regulations for the pulp and paper industry in 2012.

===== Forest management =====
Laws, regulations, and policies directing forest management on U.S. federal lands are well-documented. The Lacey Act of 1900 provides sanctions for illegal logging.

==== Canada ====
In Canada, federal and provincial environmental law is the primary source of regulations for pulp and paper mills. The following three listed Federal regulations are related to emissions to water:

1. Pulp and Paper Effluent Regulations: sets standards for the level of acute lethality to fish, biochemical oxygen demand and total suspended solids. Mills are also required to conduct environmental effects monitoring to determine the impact of their effluents on receiving waters and investigate the causes of, and solutions for, environmental effects associated with mill effluent.
2. Pulp and Paper Mill Effluent Chlorinated Dioxins and Furans Regulations: issued under the Canadian Environmental Protection Act and applies to polychlorinated dibenzo-para-dioxins and polychlorinated dibenzofurans in mill effluents.
3. Pulp and Paper Mill Defoamer and Wood Chip Regulation: regulates use of defoamers containing dibenzofuran or dibenzo-para-dioxin at pulp and paper mills using a chlorine bleaching process.

There are also regulations in place to control the releases of contaminants into the air, including particulate matter and ground-level ozone and these include the Canadian Ambient Air Quality Standards Regulations. At the federal level, Environment and Climate Change Canada (ECCC) has a legislated, publicly accessible inventory of pollutant releases to air, water and land, as well as disposals and recycling, namely the National Pollutant Release Inventory, which companies are required to report each year. Operators of facilities that meet the reporting criteria are required to report facility greenhouse gas (GHG) emissions to ECCC each year.

Some provinces have their own regulatory frameworks to manage air quality such as the Ontario provincial standards, as well as to control GHG emissions including the British Columbia Carbon Tax, Alberta Climate Leadership Plan, and the Ontario and Quebec Cap and Trade Systems.

In Canada, where 94% of the country's forests are on public land, a framework of federal, provincial and territorial laws, regulations and policies enforces and guides sustainable forest management practices.

==== International ====
"The Environmental, Health, and Safety (EHS) Guidelines are technical reference documents with general and industry specific examples of Good International Industry Practice (GIIP)." In simpler terms, the EHS is what helps develop the federal regulations on industries and companies that require factories that have the potential to cause a great amount of harm to society and the environment. These Guidelines for the environment, health and safety list out the specific rules for the paper mill industries that explains what they need to follow in order to limit the pollution that is consequently distributed and by the mills.

=== Mechanical pulp mills ===
Wood pulp produced primarily by grinding wood is known as "mechanical pulp" and is used mainly for newsprint.These mechanical processes use fewer chemicals than either kraft or sulfite mills. The primary source of pollution from these mills is organic material such as resin acids released from the wood when it is processed. Mechanical wood pulp is "brightened," as opposed to bleached, using less toxic chemicals than are needed for chemical pulps.

=== Alternative fibers ===
Use of alternative natural fibers can offer environmental benefits:

1. Decreased Deforestation: The use of alternative fibers reduces the stress on forests, minimizing the need for large-scale deforestation; protects fragile and ecologically valuable regions.
2. Decreased Carbon Footprint: Alternative fiber paper generally has a decreased environmental effect as compared to standard pulpwood paper. The manufacturing system emits fewer greenhouse gases, consumes less strength, and requires less water. Additionally, it frequently includes fewer chemical treatments.
3. Usage of Agricultural Residues: Alternative fibers include agricultural residues like wheat straw, rice straw, and bagasse. Making use of those by-products of agriculture reduces waste and presents an extra source of revenue for farmers.

== Inks ==
Three main issues with the environmental impact of printing inks is the use of volatile organic compounds, heavy metals and non-renewable oils. Standards for the amount of heavy metals in ink have been set by some regulatory bodies. There is a trend toward using vegetable oils rather than petroleum oils in recent years due to a demand for better sustainability.

Deinking recycled paper pulp results in a waste slurry which may go to landfill. De-inking at Cross Pointe's Miami, Ohio mill in the United States results in sludge weighing 22% of the weight of wastepaper recycled.

In the 1970s federal regulations for inks in the United States governed the use of toxic metals such as lead, arsenic, selenium, mercury, cadmium and hexavalent chromium.

== See also ==
- Totally chlorine free paper
- Elemental chlorine free paper
- List of environmental issues
- Life cycle assessment
- Pollution of the Tarawera River
- Pollution of the Fox River
- Stone paper
- Tissue paper § Sustainability
- Toilet paper § Environmental considerations
