= Bell Bay Pulp Mill =

Proposed industrial project in Tasmania, Australia

Coordinates: 41°9′18″S 146°55′37″E

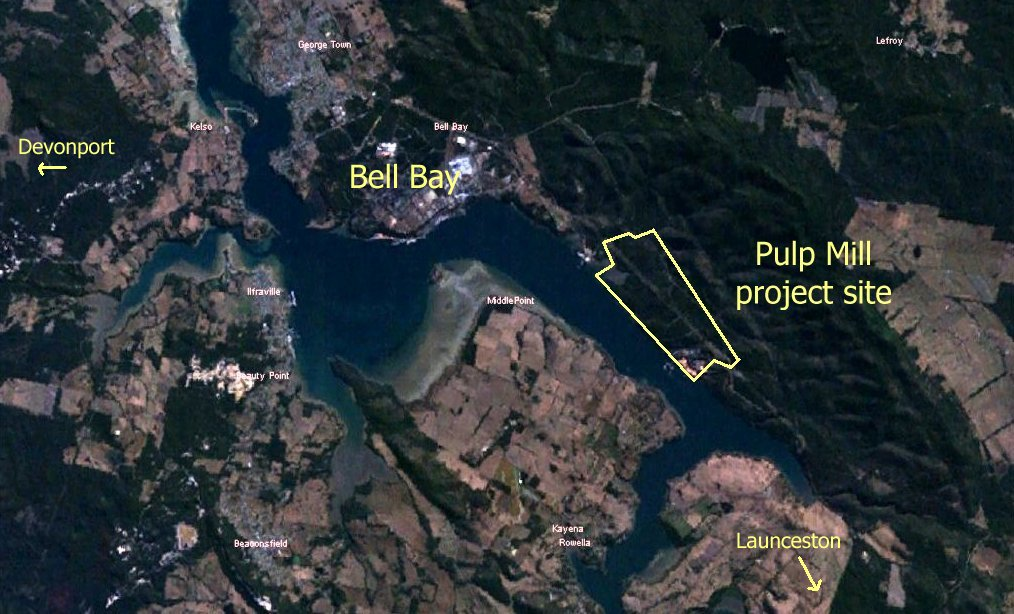
Proposed project site

Dossier (11 10)

The Bell Bay Pulp Mill, also known as the Tamar Valley Pulp Mill or Gunns Pulp Mill, was a proposed $2.3 billion pulp mill in which the former Gunns Limited was planning to build in the Tamar Valley, near Launceston, Tasmania.

Gunns Limited went into voluntary administration in 2012, and on 30 August 2017, the permits for the proposed building lapsed, signalling the end of the project. A Gunns spokesperson said they will not contest the lapsing of the permits.

== Proposed mill ==
The proposed mill is to use the Kraft process, with Elemental Chlorine Free bleaching, and it is claimed it is to be fed with 100 per cent plantation grown eucalyptus feed stock, having a production capacity of 1.1 million tonnes per annum of Air Dried pulp. Construction of the mill is supported by the State Government and the Federal Government and opposed by a number of environmentally focused and other local community groups.

== Historical and local context ==
It is not the first pulp mill proposed for Tasmania. In 1989 Wesley Vale pulp mill was proposed but did not go ahead. The Wesley Vale project was to be a kraft mill and was also subject to local opposition due to its use of elemental chlorine as the main bleaching chemical, which was a convention of that time. As a result of the failure of the Wesley Vale project, a major series of scientific studies termed the National Pulp Mills Research Program was commissioned by the Commonwealth Government to support an update and strengthening of the Australian guidelines for this industry sector. At about the same time, significant changes in bleaching technology and waste water treatment in relation to kraft pulp mills were also being made throughout the world.

On completion of the scientific studies, the Tasmanian guidelines for any new Tasmanian mill were then developed and published in 2004, which included provisions that meant that any future project must implement either Elemental Chlorine Free or Totally Chlorine Free bleaching technology.

Tasmania was an innovator in pulp and paper in the 1930s and 40s, with one pulp mill established in the Derwent Valley and one at Burnie. The Burnie pulp mill no longer exists and the mill in the Derwent Valley (Boyer) is vastly different from that proposed for the Tamar Valley, being a smaller scale (295,000 tpa), a thermo-mechanical process and includes paper making machines (producing news print on site), in comparison to the more sophisticated kraft process producing higher value pulp for further processing into copying paper, tissues etc. by off-site customers.

== Economics ==
The State commissioned research that reported the project will generate $6.7 billion in spending over 25 years and create up to 1600 temporary jobs during the construction phase. After construction, it has been estimated by consultants engaged by Gunns that approximately 3100 extra long term jobs will be created in Tasmania and that approximately one twelfth of these will be employed by the operator at the pulp mill.

A report by Naomi Edwards, Economics Adviser to Australian Greens Leader Bob Brown has questioned the financial viability of the proposed Tamar Valley pulp mill. Greens Senator Christine Milne was criticised for describing the report as "independent" when it was written by a Greens adviser and paid for by Senator Milne using her taxpayer-funded allowance.

A January 2008 report commissioned by The Wilderness Society estimated the Bell Bay Pulp Mill may run at a $300 million loss to Tasmania.

However the company told the Australian Securities Exchange (ASX) in February 2011 that the mill would generate between A$475 million and A$500 million in pre-tax earnings.

The company has released statements (on numerous occasions – 2008, 2009 and 2010) that it was in negotiations with several partners to secure financial backing for the proposed pulp mill. A new company called Southern Star Corporation has been set up to build and operate the pulp mill. It is a private company with Gunns intending to retain a 51% equity share with the remaining 49% being made available for potential investors.

== Location ==
The proposed site had been classified as a Private Conservation Area (Sanctuary) since 1958 but this was revoked by the Tasmanian State Government in 2007 (under section 21 of the Nature Conservation Act 2002). The proposed site is at Long Reach and is adjacent to the industrial area known as Bell Bay which is currently zoned 'Heavy Industrial'. Industry already located at Bell Bay includes an aluminum smelter, a metallurgical plant, a gas-fired thermal power station (decommissioned), a recently commissioned combined cycle gas turbine power station and a saw-milling and wood chipping facility. Included in the proposed development is construction of a large warehouse and wharf north of and not within the Tamar River Conservation Area as well as the installation of a water supply pipe to be drilled under or 'jet trenched' into the bed of the Tamar River in order to cross it. The proposed Pulp Mill will also include on site production of chlorine dioxide and other chemicals and a steam turbine power station fed by a large Recovery boiler and a smaller Biomass boiler.

== Project assessment and approval ==
The Tasmanian Government employed the Finnish consultants, Sweco Pic, to conduct an environmental impact assessment of the proposed mill. Community groups opposed to the mill criticised the choice of this company.

Gunns withdrew from Tasmania's independent planning and development assessment process (the RPDC) in March 2007 after senior RPDC panel members cited the mill design as 'critically non-compliant'. The next day then premier Paul Lennon recalled parliament and by the end of the month new fast-track pulp mill assessment legislation was passed by both Houses of Parliament.

On 4 October 2007 the then federal Minister for Environment and Water Resources, Malcolm Turnbull, gave Commonwealth approval for the mill which had previously been given approval at a state level by the Tasmanian Government. Turnbull stated that an extra 24 conditions, beyond a series of draft departmental conditions previously published, would be imposed on the project giving a total of 48 conditions. He said the decision was based on science and recommendations made by the Australian Governments chief scientist Dr Jim Peacock. Tasmanian Premier, Paul Lennon, said the federal conditions duplicate permit conditions already mandated by the Tasmanian parliament. He has also noted that one benchmark had been relaxed from draft conditions, being the monthly average concentration limit of chlorate in the effluent.

In 2009, (then) Federal Environment Minister, Peter Garrett, would not grant the proposed mill the final necessary operational approval before then planned studies were completed on its potential impact on the marine environment and allowed Gunns a further twenty six months to complete the studies. A new condition was also placed on the mill, meaning Gunns could be liable for criminal and civil penalties if the mill breached defined "environmental limits" during operations.

In early March 2011, following a one-week delay after Gunns contacted his department the day prior to the deadline requesting tougher environment standards, the Federal Environment Minister, Tony Burke, gave the final approval for the Gunns' proposed pulp mill, on the basis of tougher environmental conditions requested by the company itself. Burke stated that demands made by environmental groups opposed to the development, particularly with regards to the chemical process to be used in the plant, had been addressed.

One of those conditions concerned the bleaching process, described by the minister as "elemental chlorine free" or ECF. Dr Karen Stack, a part-time lecturer and researcher in the School of Chemistry at the University of Tasmania, states an ECF system uses chlorine dioxide instead of chlorine to bleach the pulp, which greatly reduces the levels of organochlorines that make it out into the environment through effluent released from a pulp mill. She describes this system a more environmentally friendly process.

== Opposition ==
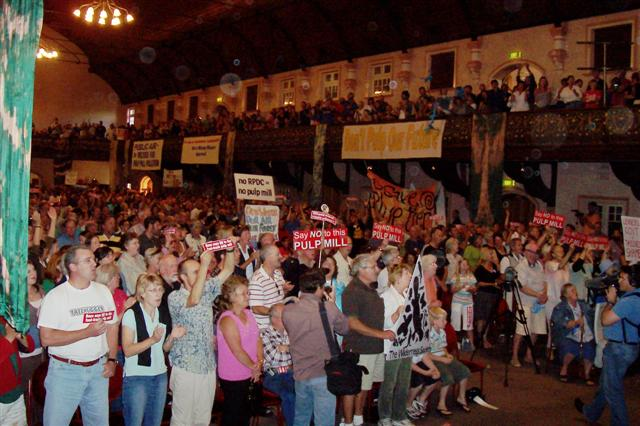
Anti-pulpmill rally (April 2007)

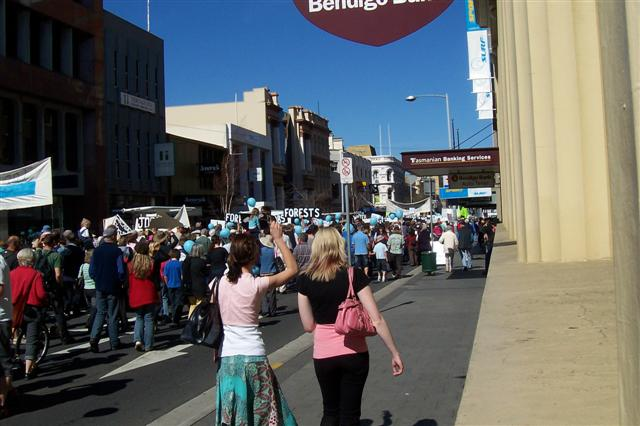
2006 Launceston rally.

Opponents of the mill include a number of environmental, social activist and political groups including The Wilderness Society, and TAP into a better Tasmania (formerly Tasmanians Against the Pulpmill).

There have been numerous rallies, public meetings, actions and protests around the entire state and especially in the north since the pulp mill was proposed. In September 2006, a protest rally against the proposed pulp mill was held in Launceston with speakers, included Greens politician Christine Milne and TV gardener Peter Cundall. In June 2007, an opposition rally to the mill attracted a crowd estimated at 10 000 and Richard Flanagan made a speech at a rally in the state's capital, Hobart, in November 2007. In August 2008, approximately 5 000 people attended a protest rally in Launceston and in March 2011, a "No Pulp Mill" rally was held at the iconic Batman Bridge in the Tamar Valley. In May 2011, another rally was held in Launceston opposing the pulp mill where Greens MP Kim Booth stated he would move a no confidence motion in the government if any more money was spent to support the pulp mill project. Protesters listened and watched outside parliament as the Tasmanian Greens attempted a last-ditch bid to revoke a law allowing Gunns to build the $2.3 billion pulp mill in the Tamar Valley. It failed when Labor and the Liberals joined to vote down the bill to repeal the Pulp Mill Assessment Act, which was fast-tracked through Parliament in 2007.

In addition to these, there have been numerous community meetings in Launceston including one regarding concerns surrounding the pipe line in 2008 a pulp mill information night in 2009 and No Pulp Mill public meetings in December 2010 and March 2011. There have also been protests outside the ANZ bank, at Gunns' AGMs at their headquarters in Launceston and at the offices of state and federal politicians.

In April 2007, allegations were made that a Gunns lawyer was involved in preparing new legislation introduced by then Premier Paul Lennon which bypasses the Resource Planning and Development Commission and replaces it with a government-appointed consultant which raised questions about Gunns influence over the current State Labor government. There are other allegations of collusion and co-operation between the company and Tasmania's political leaders. Professor Quentin Beresford from Perth WA has written an academic paper citing the Lennon government's approval of the Gunns pulp mill in Tasmania as a case study to illustrate the notion of institutional corruption.

Gunns sued 20 environmental organisations and individuals for some $6 million in the days preceding the announcement of its plans to build a pulp mill in the Tamar Valley.

The proposal had been criticised for not using accepted technology for the bleaching process and instead involved the presence of elemental chlorine at an intermediate stage (rather than hydrogen peroxide or methanol) in the production of the main bleaching chemical chlorine dioxide. This particular criticism could only refer to Gunns' original preferred chemical plant design termed and 'integrated' chemical plant, which was one of three chemical plant designs presented for assessment. The integrated process as then described by Gunns had not been approved by the United Nations Environment Programme as Accepted Modern Technology (AMT) for this purpose and therefore was inconsistent with Tasmanian guidelines. By comparison, the two alternative chemical plant designs, presented by Gunns as "merchant chemical plant alternative 1" and "2" were AMT. According to Dr Warwick Raverty, a chemist with over 20 years experience in the Kraft pulping and paper, a hiccup with a waterspray within an "integrated" process could cause the bleaching chemical chlorine dioxide to be contaminated with elemental chlorine. Elemental chlorine contamination of the chlorine dioxide bleaching chemical could in turn lead to the release of persistent organic pollutants (dioxins), potentially causing environmental harm and a subsequent breach of the Stockholm Convention. The "integrated" design for chlorine dioxide generation was not selected by Gunns to proceed as it was effectively prevented from implementation by the State Permit (Condition 3GN9.1). Gunns has subsequently indicated it will move from "ECF" to "ECF-Light" bleaching, which is facilitated by moving from "Merchant alternative 1" to "Merchant alternative 2" within the final design of the chemical plant described above. Raverty resigned from the now defunct Resource Planning and Development Commission (RPDC) panel on the mill, citing undue political interference.

In July 2007, The Wilderness Society launched a legal case against the federal government, claiming the Federal Minister for the Environment and Water Resources, Malcolm Turnbull, acted illegally by allowing the pulp mill to escape proper assessment by the independent RPDC. Turnbull agreed to withhold a decision on the approval of the mill until after 6 August conclusion of the case. The case was dismissed in August 2007.

Former Gunns director, John Gay, had previously put pressure on the state government to approve the mill quickly by threatening to take the project interstate or overseas: the company has already invested an estimated $100 million (5% of expenditure) on plans and consultants for the $2.3 billion project. Geoffrey Cousins, former adviser to John Howard, has also been a vocal opponent of the mill, comparing it to the Franklin River Dam.

Paul Lennon has claimed that the wood supply agreement "will not provide for any old growth timber to be used in the pulp mill.", while Peter Garrett has said that the tracts of old growth forest that will supply the mill were already earmarked for logging under the Regional Forest Agreement.

In January 2010, the company told the Australian Securities Exchange that the mill would not use any old growth or other native timber, and would be 100 per cent plantation timber fed from start-up.

A second legal challenge against the Federal approval process for the Pulp Mill was undertaken by a group known as Lawyers For Forests (LFF). The case questioned the legality of the decision making process taken by former Environment Minister, Malcolm Turnbull. The LFF claimed in court that Mr Turnbull did not adequately assess the proposed mill as he was required to by law. The case was dismissed in April 2009 and costs awarded against Lawyers For Forests.

The Wilderness Society, Environment Tasmania and the Australian Conservation Foundation have welcomed the Gunns pledge to improve effluent standards and promised to support them if the details released by Gunns matched the commitment, but agree that the community would never give a "Social Approval" for the mill. The Wilderness Society spokesman Vica Bayley has stated that The Wilderness Society would never approve the contentious pulp mill, regardless of any future changes to its design or operations, citing the "corrupted" approval process making it forever unacceptable. This new tough stance coincided with further splits emerging between Tasmanian environmental groups over the failure to halt logging in all high-conservation-value forests in an immediate moratorium. Dr Phill Pullinger of Environment Tasmania stated in March 2011 that "It's not a proposal that we'll ever be in a position that we'll endorse or support".

Gunns shares were trading at A$4.50 in December 2004 (announcement of Bell Bay Pulp Mill). Gunns have been in a trading halt since March 2012 with the share price at A$0.16 and have yet to relist (as of 17 September 2012).
