= Streptomyces mexicanus =

Scientific classification
- Domain: Bacteria
- Kingdom: Bacillati
- Phylum: Actinomycetota
- Class: Actinomycetes
- Order: Streptomycetales
- Family: Streptomycetaceae
- Genus: Streptomyces
- Species: S. mexicanus

Binomial name
- Streptomyces mexicanus Petrosyan et al. 2003

Type strain
- BM-B-384, CH-M-1035, CIP 108132, DSM 41796, JCM 12681, NBRC 100915, NNRL B-24196, NRRL B-24196

Species of bacterium

Streptomyces mexicanus is a xylanolytic and thermophilic bacterium species from the genus of Streptomyces which has been isolated from soil from a sugar cane field in Mexico. Streptomyces mexicanus produces xylanase and B-xylosidase.

== See also ==
- List of Streptomyces species
