= Streptomyces rameus =

Scientific classification
- Domain: Bacteria
- Kingdom: Bacillati
- Phylum: Actinomycetota
- Class: Actinomycetia
- Order: Streptomycetales
- Family: Streptomycetaceae
- Genus: Streptomyces
- Species: S. rameus

Binomial name
- Streptomyces rameus Shibata 1959

Type strain
- ATCC 21273, BCRC 12045, CCRC 12045, CGMCC 4.1763, DSM 41685, HUT-6618, IFO 15453, IFO 16196, JCM 5064, KCC S-1064, KCCM 12270, KCTC 9767, Kyowa Hakko 154, LMG 20326, NBRC 15453, NBRC 16196, NRRL B-16924

Species of bacterium

Streptomyces rameus is a bacterium species from the genus of Streptomyces which has been isolated from soil in Tokyo in Japan. Streptomyces rameus produces streptomycin and endo-xylanase.

== See also ==
- List of Streptomyces species
