= 1996 in the environment =

This is a list of notable events relating to the environment in 1996. They relate to environmental law, conservation, environmentalism and environmental issues.

== Events ==
- The IPCC Second Assessment Report is published.
- The woodchipping of indigenous forests in New Zealand is stopped.
- The Western Shield wildlife conservation programme commences in Western Australia.
- Construction of the Bakun Dam begins in the Malaysian state of Sarawak. When completed it will flood 700 square kilometres (270 sq mi) of rainforest and displace more than 9,000 indigenous people.
- A number of protected areas were established in 1996, including Agusan Marsh Wildlife Sanctuary in the Philippines, Boston Harbor Islands National and State Park in Massachusetts, Cornwall Hills Provincial Park in British Columbia, and Illinizas Ecological Reserve in Ecuador.

=== January ===
- The North Cape oil spill occurred when the tank barge North Cape and the tug Scandia grounded on Moonstone Beach in South Kingstown, Rhode Island in the United States.

=== February ===
- The Sea Empress oil spill occurred at the entrance to the Milford Haven Waterway in Pembrokeshire, Wales.

=== May ===
- The Convention of the Protection, Management and Development of the Marine and Coastal Environment of the Eastern African Region or Nairobi Convention of 1985, a regional framework agreement for marine environmental management, comes into effect.
- US president Bill Clinton signed the Mercury-Containing and Rechargeable Battery Management Act.

=== June ===
- The Hazardous Substances and New Organisms Act is passed in New Zealand.

=== August ===
- US president Bill Clinton signed the Safe Drinking Water Act Amendments of 1996.
- US president Bill Clinton signed the Sustainable Fisheries Act of 1996.

=== November ===
- World-renowned bird expert Tony Silva is sentenced to seven years in prison without parole for leading an illegal parrot smuggling ring.

=== December ===
- The United Nations Convention to Combat Desertification entered into force.

== See also ==
- Human impact on the environment
- List of environmental issues
- List of years in the environment
