= AOX =

AOX or Aox can refer to:

- Adsorbable organic halides, a group of halogenated organic substances that are able to adsorb onto activated carbon
- Aox Inc., a defunct American manufacturer of computer expansion cards
- Antioxidant
- Alternative oxidase, an enzyme that forms part of the electron transport chain in mitochondria of different organisms
- short name for Xanthi F.C., a Greek football club based in Xanthi
