= EOX =

EOX may refer to:

- Eox, a brand name for the drug Naproxen
- EOX, scientific abbreviation for extractable organic halides, measured alongside adsorbable organic halides
- EOX, abbreviation of the Greek name for the Hellenic Winter Sports Federation, Ελληνική Ομοσπονδία Χειμερινών (eox.gr)
- EOx, abbreviation of Electro-oxidation
- EOX IT Services GmbH, an implementing product of Web Coverage Service
- Eox, clipping of signaling compond eoxin
- EOX, band of Taylor Deupree
- EOX, a chemotherapy regimen of epirubicin, oxaliplatin, and capecitabine
- Abbreviation for Polytechnician officer candidate, a French army designation achieved by Arnaud Prost
