= Streptomyces galbus =

Scientific classification
- Domain: Bacteria
- Kingdom: Bacillati
- Phylum: Actinomycetota
- Class: Actinomycetes
- Order: Streptomycetales
- Family: Streptomycetaceae
- Genus: Streptomyces
- Species: S. galbus

Binomial name
- Streptomyces galbus Frommer 1959

Type strain
- 1354, 1364, ATCC 23910, BCRC 12166, CBS 831.68, CCRC 12166, CGMCC 4.1958, DSM 40089, ETH 24322, IFO 12864, IMET 42937, IMET 42937, ISP 5089, JCM 4222, JCM 4639, KCC S-0222, KCCS-0222, KCTC 19063, NBIMCC 3644, NBRC 12864, NCIMB 13005, NRRL B-2283, NRRL-ISP 5089, RIA 1121, VKM Ac-165, Wind 731

Species of bacterium

Streptomyces galbus is a bacterium species from the genus of Streptomyces which has been isolated from soil from West Bengal. Streptomyces galbus produces xylanase, galbonolides A, galbonolides B and the actinomycin X complex.

== See also ==
- List of Streptomyces species
