= Johan Richter =

Johan Richter may refer to:

- Johan Richter (architect) (1925-1998), Danish architect
- Johan Richter (inventor) (1901–1997), Norwegian-Swedish inventor
- Johan Richter (painter) (1665–1745), Swedish painter active in Italy
