= Streptomyces olivaceoviridis =

Scientific classification
- Domain: Bacteria
- Kingdom: Bacillati
- Phylum: Actinomycetota
- Class: Actinomycetes
- Order: Streptomycetales
- Family: Streptomycetaceae
- Genus: Streptomyces
- Species: S. olivaceoviridis

Binomial name
- Streptomyces olivaceoviridis Pridham et al. 1958

Type strain
- AS 4.1430, ATCC 23630, ATCC 25478, BCRC 15145, CBS 888.29, CBS 888.69, CCRC 15145, CGMCC 4.1430, DSM 40334, ETH 31575, Gause11584, IFO 13066, IMET 43128, INA 11584, ISP 5334, JCM 4499, KCC S-0499, KCCS-0499, KCTC 9132, Lanoot R-8686, LMG 19324, NBRC 13066, NCIB 9982, NCIMB 9982, NRRL B-12280, NRRL-ISP 5334, R-8686, RIA 1258, VKM Ac-1852

Synonyms
- Actinomyces olivaceoviridis

Species of bacterium

Streptomyces olivaceoviridis is a bacterium species from the genus of Streptomyces which has been isolated from soil. Streptomyces olivaceoviridis produces chitinase and xylanase.

== See also ==
- List of Streptomyces species
