= Chlorine bleaching =

Chlorine bleaching may refer to chlorine-based bleaching in

- the pulp and paper industry: Chlorine and hypochlorite bleaching of wood pulp
- household cleaning: Chlorine-based bleaches
