= Tamar River Conservation Area =

Protected area near Launceston, Tasmania

Coordinates: 41°20′23.39″S 147°2′3.06″E

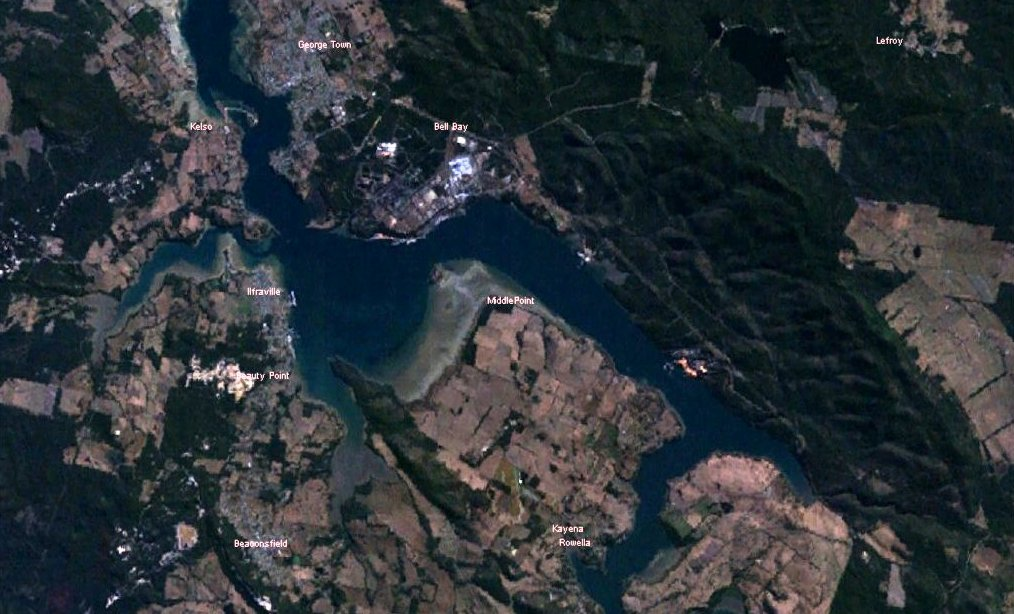
Tamar River wetlands area

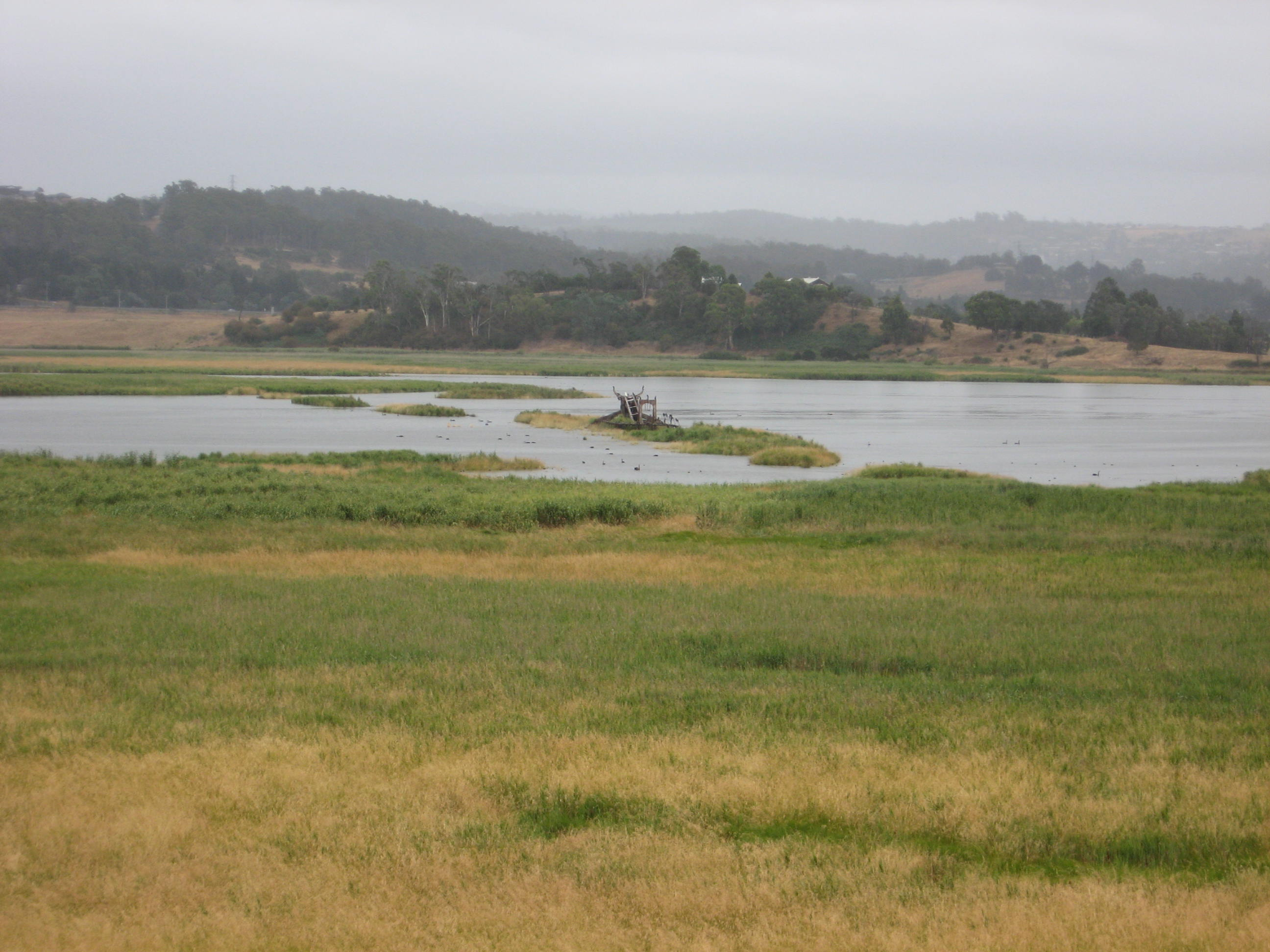
Tamar Island Wetlands

The Tamar Conservation Area covers approximately 4,633 ha on the Tamar River estuary in Tasmania. It includes the Tamar Island Wetlands Reserve and a stretches through the upper part of the Tamar Estuary from St Leonards to the Batman Bridge. It is a popular area for birdwatching and is about 15 minutes drive from Launceston. There are approximately 3.2 km of walking tracks at the wetlands including a boardwalk for easy access to the island.

The site lies within the Tamar Wetlands Important Bird Area, identified as such by BirdLife International because of its importance in supporting over 1% of the world populations of pied oystercatchers and chestnut teals. The Tasmanian State of the Environment report in 2003 described the Tamar estuary as one of the five catchments statewide with the highest percentage area under urban and suburban land use.

== Proposed pulp mill ==
In May 2007 both major political parties in Tasmania attempted to push through the development of a 1.5 billion dollar Bell Bay Pulp Mill on the eastern bank of the Tamar River by Gunns. Within the Tamar River Conservation area is proposed the construction of a large and associated warehouse and wharf as well as the insertion of a supply pipe to be 'jet trenched' into the bed of the River.
