= Tamar Wetlands Important Bird Area =

Wetland in Tasmania, Australia

Coordinates: 41°18′22″S 147°00′49″E

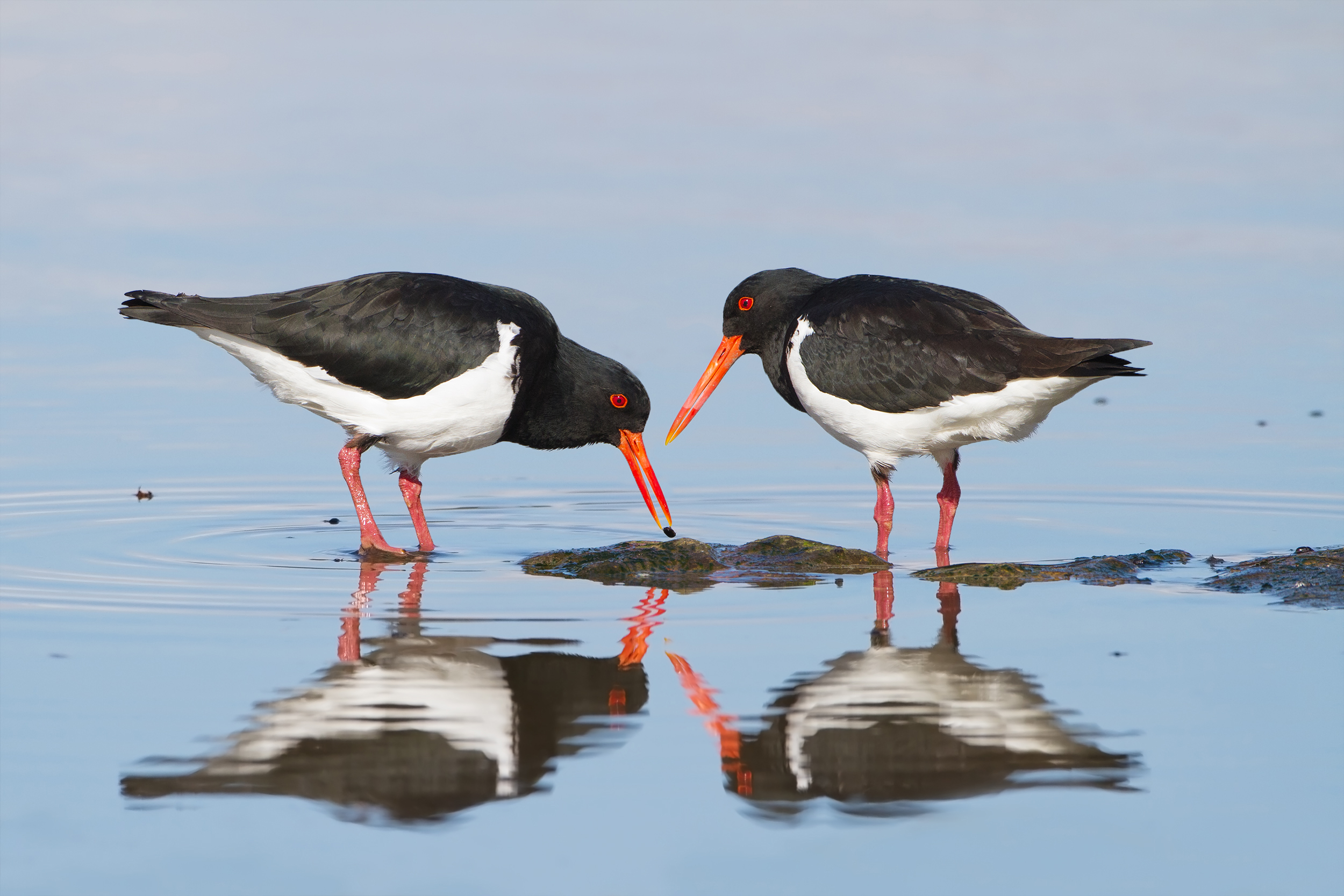
The IBA is an important area for pied oystercatchers.

The Tamar Wetlands Important Bird Area is a linear stretch of wetland habitat, with an area of 51 km^{2}, extending along the upper half of the estuarine Tamar River in northern Tasmania, Australia.

== Description ==
The Important Bird Area (IBA) comprises the open water of the Tamar, with its intertidal mudflats and associated wetland vegetation, from Launceston downstream to Batman Bridge, halfway to the sea. The mudflats are fringed by saltmarsh and extensive reed beds, and the IBA is bordered by a landscape mosaic of farmland and production forests. It includes the 46 km^{2} Tamar River Conservation Area and overlaps the Native Point Conservation Reserve. The average maximum temperatures in the region are 13 °C in winter and 24 °C in summer.

== Birds ==
The site has been identified as an IBA by BirdLife International because it supports over 1% of the world populations of chestnut teals and pied oystercatchers. Australasian bitterns have occasionally been recorded there.
