= Illinizas Ecological Reserve =

Ecological reserve in Ecuador

Coordinates: 0.7023°S 79.0645°W

The double peak of The Illinizas

Illinizas Ecological Reserve (sometimes referred to as Illinizas National Park) is a protected area in Ecuador, located in the provinces of Cotopaxi and Pichincha. The reserve consists of 149,900 hectares and lies 55 kilometers south of Quito.

The Reserve was established in 1996 and contains the twin peaks of the Illinizas as well as the Quilotoa crater lake.

== See also ==
- 1996 in the environment
