= Pulp and paper industry in the United States =

The United States is one of the biggest paper consumers in the world. Between 1990 and 2002, paper consumption in the United States increased from 84.9 million tons to 97.3 million tons. In 2006, there were approximately 450 paper mills in the United States, accounting for $68 billion.

== Leading companies ==
The top 10 forest and paper products companies in net sales in the United States in 2012 were:

Rank	Company	2012 Net Sales (US$M)	2012 Net Income (Loss) (US$M)
1	International Paper	21,833	799
2	Kimberly-Clark	21,063	1,750
3	RockTenn	9,208	249
4	Weyerhaeuser	6,221	385
5	MeadWestvaco	5,459	205
6	Sonoco	4786	196
7	Graphic Packaging	4,337	123
8	NewPage	3,131	1258
9	Packaging Corporation of America	2,844	164
10	Boise Cascade	2,779	41

== Manufacturing statistics ==
U.S. Pulp and Paper Manufacturing Statistics, 2001
	Number of employees	Total payroll ($1,000)	Total cost of materials ($1,000)	Total cost of shipments ($1,000)
Pulp mills	7,218	414,452	1,847,086	3,238,832
Paper mills	114,670	6,162,914	22,108,471	46,852,538
Paperboard mills	48,773	2,601,324	10,915,434	21,895,908

== Exports ==
U.S. Total Pulp and Paper Exports (US$ million)
Product	1997	1998	1999	2000	2001	2002
Pulp, Paper & Paperboard Mill Products	9,752	8,947	8,850	10,276	8,849	7,809
Converted Paper Products	4,842	4,873	5,281	5,702	5,647	6,299

== See also ==
- Environmental issues with paper
- Toilet paper in the United States
- Wood industry
