= Elemental chlorine free =

Bleaching wood pulp with chlorine dioxide

Elemental chlorine free (ECF) is a technique that uses chlorine dioxide for the bleaching of wood pulp. It does not use elemental chlorine gas during the bleaching process and prevents the formation of dioxins and dioxin-like compounds, carcinogens. The traditional ECF sequence is DEopDEpD using the common letter symbols for bleaching stages, though many improved sequences are available.

Totally chlorine free (TCF) is paper that does not use any chlorine compounds for wood pulp bleaching.

== See also ==
- Environmental issues with paper
