= Johan Richter (inventor) =

Norwegian-Swedish engineer, industrialist and inventor (1901-1997)

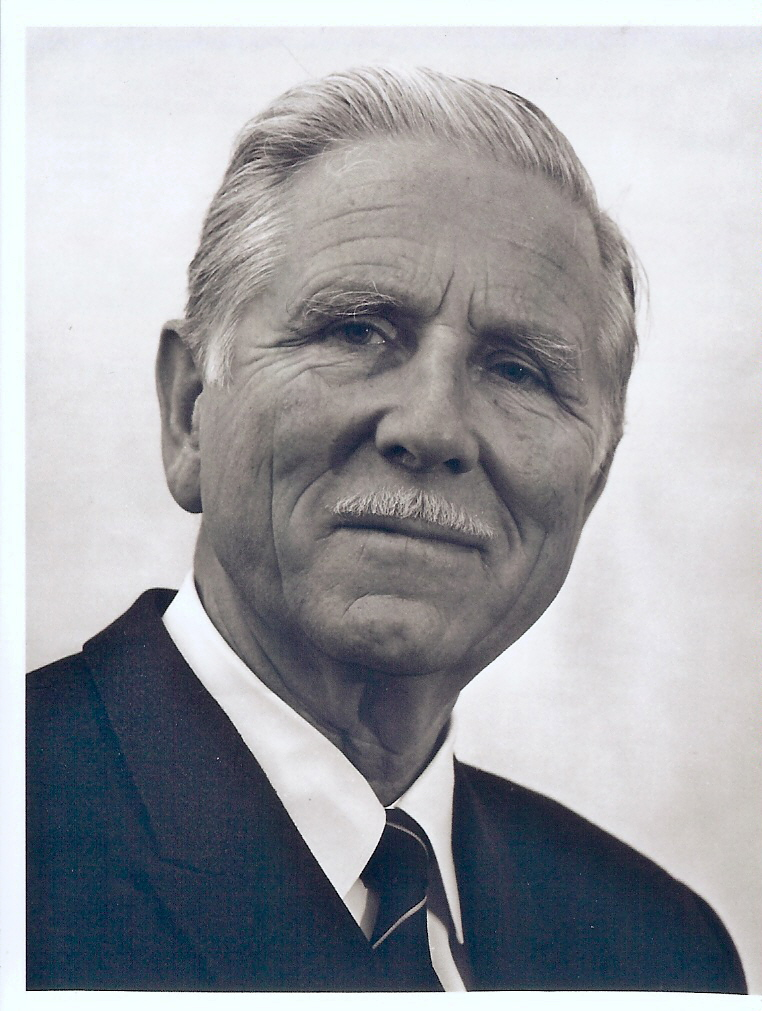
- Richter in 1965
- Born: Johan Christopher Fredrik Carl Richter; 12 November 1901; Lier, Buskerud
- Died: 13 June 1997 (aged 95)
- Occupations: Engineer, industrialist, inventor

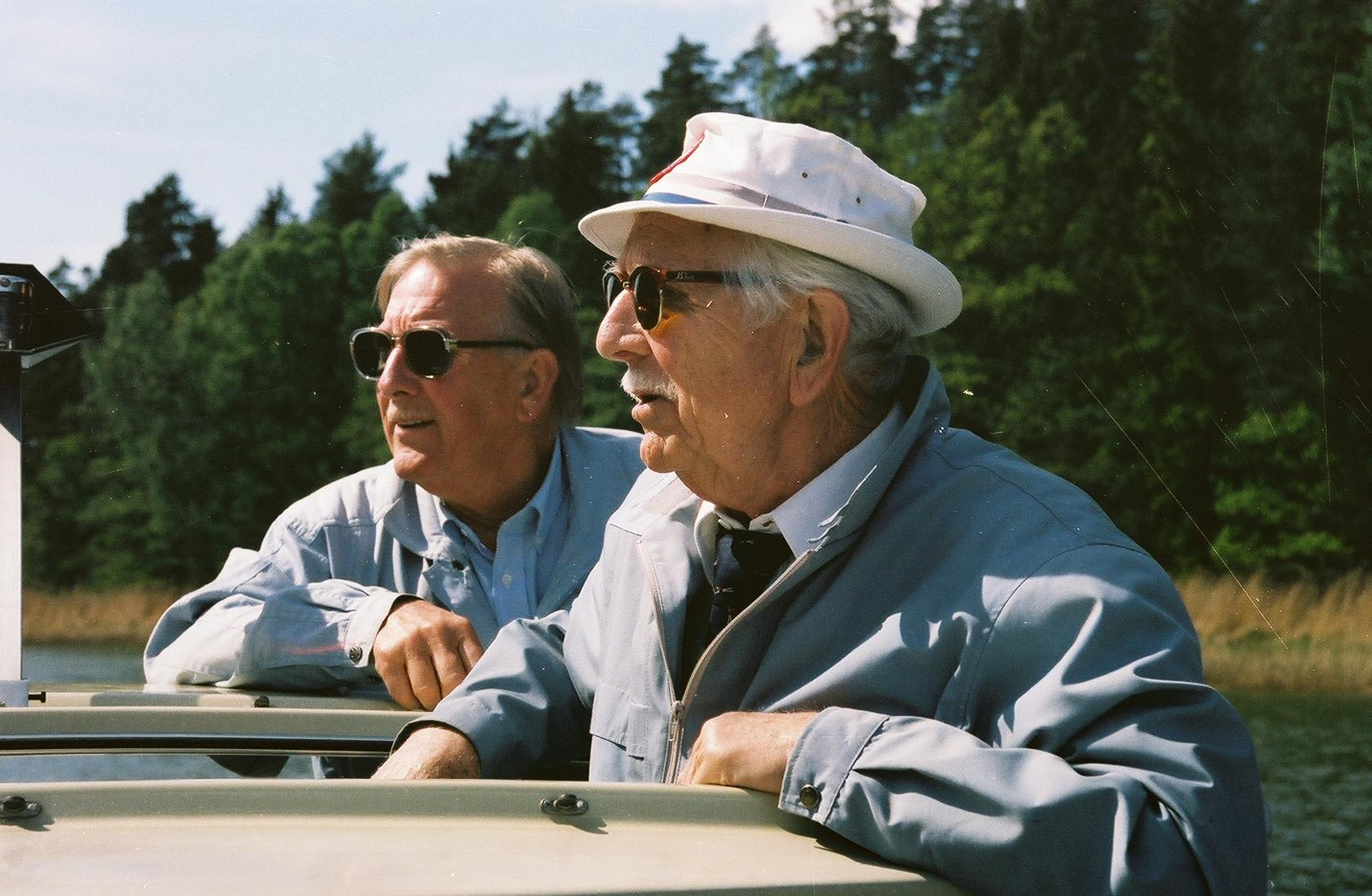
Johan Richter with son Ole Johan. 1989

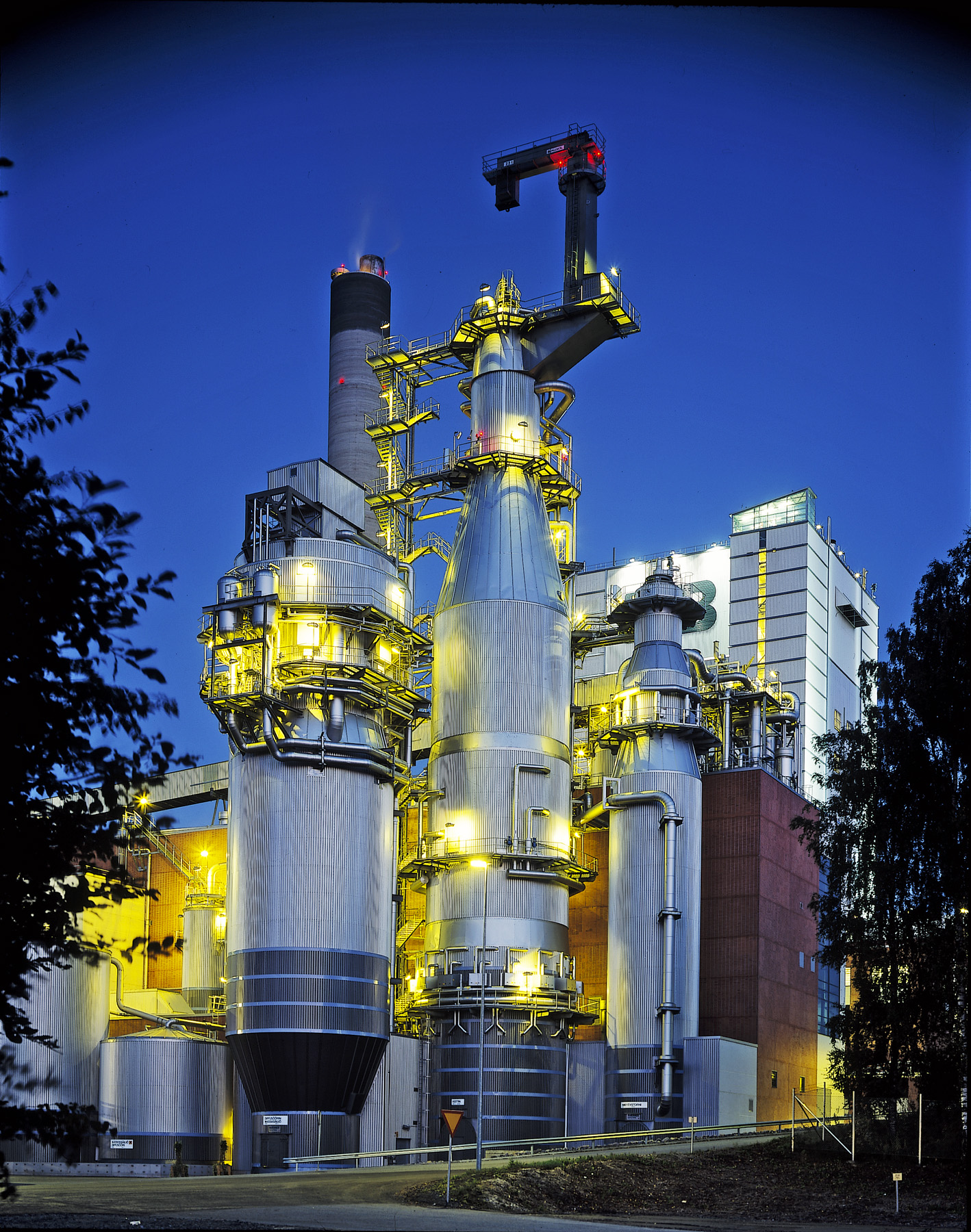
The middle tower is a typical Richter designed digester for pulp. The right cylinder is for preparation of the chips and the left silo is for intermediate storage.

Johan Christopher Fredrik Carl Richter (12 November 1901 – 13 June 1997) was a Norwegian-Swedish engineer, industrialist and inventor in the area of pulp and paper production. He developed the continuous processes for the digesting and bleaching of wood pulp used by his paper company Kamyr (now part of Andritz AG and Valmet).

== Background ==
Richter was born in Lier, Buskerud and grew up at Narvik in Nordland, Norway. His father had a management position at LKAB, which shipped its ore through Narvik. Beginning in 1919, he went to school in Trondheim. He graduated as a mechanical engineer at the Norwegian University of Science and Technology in 1924. He took on a position in France where he worked on turbines and advanced pumping equipment. In France, he met and married Astri Rören (1908–1992), who bore him two children: Ole Johan (1929) and Einar Christian (1932–1997).

Later, Richter returned to Norway and settled in Oslo, where he joined Thunes Mechanical Workshop to continue his work on turbines. Due to the Great Depression, he was let go in 1932.

== Inventor and executive ==
Myrens Verkstäder hired Richter to head up the organisation with the specific task to develop and market new technologies for bleaching and other innovations within pulp and paper. Myrens Verkstäder and Karlstads Mekaniska Verkstad in Sweden already had a small joint venture within pulp and paper technology named Kamyr that was located in Karlstad, Sweden.

In the middle of the 1930s, Kamyr launched their new process for continuous bleaching that was developed and patented by Richter. The company had an immediate success in Europe and later, worldwide. Kamyr grew quickly and obtained the necessary resources and credibility for innovations to come.

Richter already had the vision to introduce a process for the continuous cooking of pulp. So far this had been done in batches, with its drawback in quality variance and being a barrier to rational nonstop production of paper. It took more than ten years to develop the Richter digester from its first prototype in 1940 to the final unit. The first installation was able to produce 30 tons per day, and a modern Richter digester produces more than 2500 tons per day.

Richter became the CEO of Kamyr in 1950 while still directly responsible for Research and Development. In the following years, Kamyr obtained more or less a monopoly position, as no other supplier was capable of presenting something similar. Paper mills all over the world switched to continuous uninterrupted production, which resulted in considerable savings and stable product quality.

== Post-CEO activity ==
In 1959, Richter decided to step down as CEO of the company in order to refocus on the technology. He assumed the title Chief Technical Advisor to the Kamyr Group. He stayed in that role until 1993, by which time he had signed over 750 patents worldwide. During this period Richter had relocated to France and collaborated with his son, Ole Johan, who was building and testing equipment and eventually also adding to the patented solutions.

== Honours and awards ==
- Honorary degree at the Swedish Royal Institute of Technology (1977)
- Honorary member of the Paper Industry Technical Association (Papirindustriens Tekniske Forening)
- Member of the Norwegian Academy of Technological Sciences
- Knight of the Italian Order of Merit (Ordine al Merito della Repubblica Italiana)
- Knight 1st class in the Order of St. Olav (1966)
- Royal Academy of Technical Sciences (Kungliga Ingenjörsvetenskapsakademien) Gold Medal (1963)
- Inducted in the Paper Industry International Hall of Fame (2009)
