= Woodchipping in New Zealand =

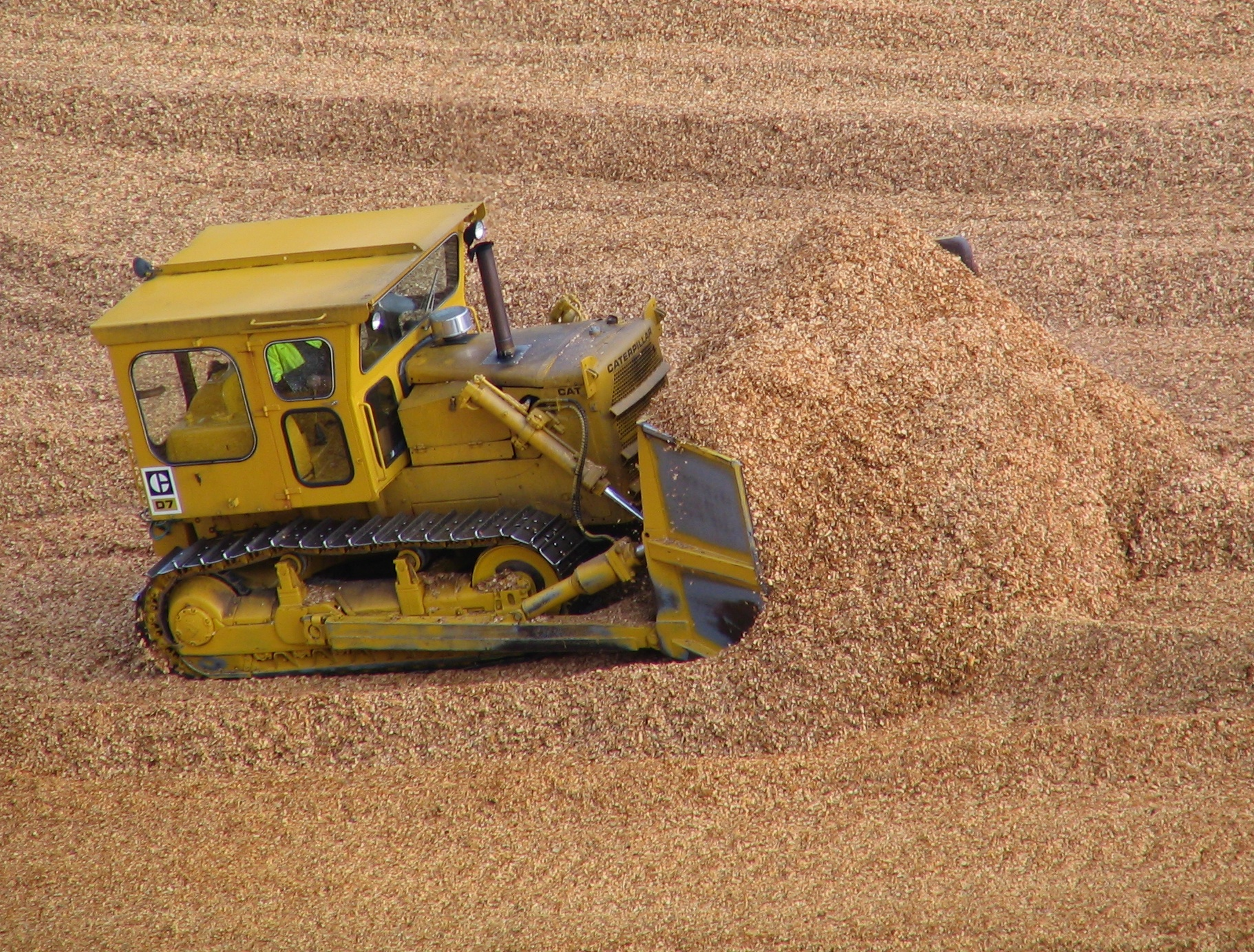
A bulldozer working the woodchip pile at Port Chalmers

Woodchipping in New Zealand is one of the sectors of the forestry industry and it attracted controversy in the 1990s when native trees were used as a source for the chipping.

== Wood chip exports ==
The Ministry of Agriculture and Forestry collates figures on quantities of wood chip exports.

Wood chip exports
Year	Hardwood		Softwood	
	Quantity (BDU)	Value ($)	Quantity (BDU)	Value ($)
1999	31,979	6,672		
2000	46,069	10,198		
2001	46,317	9,838		
2002	6,721	1,278		
2003	14,828	2,130	309,351	44,912
2004	18,636	1,869	206,345	29,868
2005	21,076	4,125	239,729	33,772
2006	47,438	9,606	186,436	29,832
2007	59,220	8,888	307,121	51,493
2008	67,525	17,670	307,881	65,844
2009	39,009	9,668	171,357	35,971

One BDU (bone dry unit) of hardwood chips in roundwood equivalent is 2.25 cubic metres and weighs 1090 kilograms.

== Controversy ==
Since the settlement of New Zealand by Māori and then by Europeans has seen a loss of 75% of the indigenous forest cover. With European settlement in the 19th century, large areas were cleared for pastoral farming and for logging. The export wood chip industry was the main cause of forest clearance on private land after 1970. By the 1980s, 95% of forest loss was due to wood chipping. The native forests were replanted with faster growing species such as the Pinus radiata.

After protests from environmentalists the exporting of wood chips from indigenous forests was stopped by the government in 1996.

== See also ==
- Forestry in New Zealand
