= Adsorbable organic halides =

Soil or water measurement

Adsorbable organic halides (AOX) is a measure of the organic halogen load at a sampling site such as soil from a land fill, water, or sewage waste. The procedure measures chlorine, bromine, and iodine as equivalent halogens, but does not measure fluorine levels in the sample.

== Background ==
Utilization of halogen containing materials in processes such as water treatment, bleaching, or even general synthesis to create the final product, generates a number of organic halides. These organic halides are released in wastewater from the oil, chemical, and paper industries, and find their way to the consumer and eventually to a landfill or oceanic dumps. Within the soil, the halo compounds resist degradation and often react with metal ions, resulting in non-degradable metal complexes, increasing soil toxicity and accumulating in the food chain of aquatic organisms. Up to 2000 ppm of these bio-accumulative organic chlorides were detected in fat of fish from the waters where bleaching effluents were disposed by paper mills, where a 2% water concentration is considered toxic for the fish. While strict regulations from the government have reduced the high level of past emissions, these compounds find their way to water sources through improper consumer disposal of items that contain chlorinated compounds. The presence of any organic halides in natural water has been considered an indication of contamination with xenobiotics. Once in water, the naturally occurring fulvic acids and humic acids can lead to formation of mutagenic compounds such as halogenated furanone MX (Z-3-chloro-4-(dichloromethyl)-5-hydroxy-2(5H)-furanone). Consumption of these mutagenic compounds could cause several abnormalities in development and reproduction in humans through long half-lives and mimicking hormone receptors. For example, compounds like dioxins can inhibit the actions of sex hormones by binding to steroid receptors along with causing long lasting cell disruption in several tissues.

== Determination ==
Persistent organic pollutants such as dichlorodiphenyltrichloroethane (DDT), polychlorinated biphenols, dioxins, are all assessed in AOX analysis. Generally, the higher the amount of chlorine in an organic compound, the more toxic it is considered. While there are several biochemical or electrochemical methods to remove organic halides, AOX has been preferred due to its low cost of operation and simplicity of design.

In a lab, the determination of AOX parameter consists of adsorption of organic halides from the sample on to an activated carbon. The activated carbon can be powdered or granular and adsorbed using microcolumns or a batch process, if the samples are rich in humic acids. Vigorous shaking is often employed in the event of a batch process to favor the adsorption of organic halide on to the activated carbon due to its electronegativity and presence of lone pairs. The inorganic halides that are also adsorbed are washed away using a strong acid such as nitric acid. The carbon with adsorbed organic halide is obtained by filtration, after which the filter containing the carbon is burnt in the presence of oxygen. While combustion of hydrocarbon part of the compounds form CO_{2} and H_{2}O, halo acids are formed from the halogens. These haloacids are absorbed into acetic acid. Subsequent use of microcolumetric titration, an electrochemical quantification method, provides the AOX content in the sample. Using the dilution ratio, the total AOX content at the location can be estimated. Alternatively, the chlorinated compounds in the sample can be determined by using pentane extraction followed by capillary gas chromatography and electron capture (GC-ECD). The organic carbon that was remaining after the nitric acid purge can be analyzed using UV-persulfate wet oxidation followed by Infrared-detection (IR). Several other analytical techniques such as high performance liquid chromatography (HPLC) could also be implemented to quantify AOX levels. The general adsorption procedure is given below:

${C^*}_(s_) + R-X (a.q)\longrightarrow {C^*}-X-R_(s_) + H_2O$

Where ${C^*}_(s_)$ is the activated carbon and $R-X$ is any organic halide.

${C^*}-X-R_(s_)$is the organic halide - activated carbon complex that can be filtered out.

== Treatment ==
=== Physical separation ===
In water treatment plants, organic halides are adsorbed using GAC or PAC in agitated tanks. The loaded carbon is separated using a membrane made out of materials like polypropylene or cellulose nitrate. Measuring the AOX levels into and out of the treatment zone shows a drop in organic halide concentrations. Some processes use a two-step GAC filtration to remove AOX precursors, and thus reduce the amount of AOX in treated waters. A two step filtration process consists of two GAC filters in series. The first filter is loaded with exhausted GAC, while the second filter is loaded with fresh GAC. This set up is preferred for its increased efficiency and higher throughput capacity. The GAC is replaced cyclically and the extracted organic halide-carbon mixture is then sent for subsequent biological or chemical treatment such as ozonation to regenerate the GAC. Often, these chemical treatments, while effective, pose economical challenges to the treatment plants.

=== Biological treatment ===
A more economically attractive option for treatment of the organic halides is through utilization of biological agents. Recently, bacteria (Ancylobacter aquaticus), fungi (Phanerochaete chrysosporium and Coiriolus versicolor), or synthetic enzymes have been used in the degradation of chlorinated organic compounds. The microorganisms degrade halocompounds using either aerobic or anaerobic processes. The mechanisms of degradation include utilization of the compound as carbon source for energy, cometabolite, or as an electron acceptor. Note that enzymatic or microbial action could be regulated through feedback inhibition-the final product in the series inhibits a reaction in the process. An example of a microbe that can degrade AOX is shown below in Figures 1 and 2.

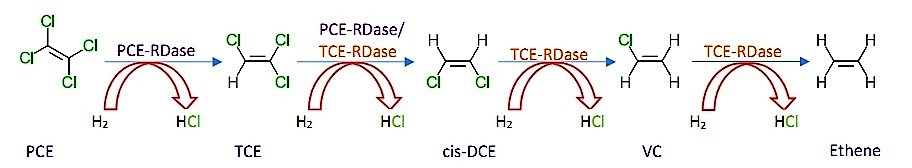
Figure 1: Step wise degradation of PCE

A sample dechlorination of chlorinated aliphatic hydrocarbons (CAHs) such as perchloroethylene (PCE) by Dehalococcoides ethenogenes has been illustrated above. PCE is one of the highly chlorinated CAHs with no known microorganisms capable of aerobic degradation. The high electronegative character of PCE renders oxidizing agent capabilities through accepting electrons by co-metabolism or dehalorespiration. In a co-metabolism, the reduction of PCE is made feasible by the utilization of a primary metabolite for carbon and energy source. In dehalorespiration, the electron transfer from oxidation of small molecules (H_{2} is the major source; but, glucose, acetate, formate, and methanol can also be used) to PCE generates energy required for the bacterial growth. The hydrogen involved in this mechanism is often a product of another process such as fermentation of simple molecules like sugars or other complex molecules like fatty acids. Moreover, due to competition from methanogens for H_{2}, low H_{2} concentrations are favored by dechlorinating bacteria, and is often established through slow-release fermentation compounds such as fatty acids and decaying bacterial biomass. While several enzymes and electron carriers are involved in process, two enzymes perform the dechlorination reactions–PCE reductive dehydrogenase (PCE-RDase) and TCE reductive dehydrogenase (TCE-RDase). The PCE-RDase is normally found freely in cytoplasm while the TCE-RDase is found attached to the exterior cytoplasmic membrane. These enzymes normally utilize a metal ion cluster like Fe-S cluster to complete electron transfer cycle. Hydrogen is oxidized to generate two protons and two electrons. The removal of first chloride, which is performed by PCE-RDase, reduces PCE into TCE by reductive dehalogenation, where a hydride replaces the chlorine. The chloride lost from PCE gains the two electrons and the proton that accompanies them to form HCl. TCE can be reduced to cis-dichloroethene (cis-DCE) by either PCE-RDase or TCE-RDase. Subsequent reductions to vinyl chloride (VC) and ethylene are performed by TCE-RDase. The dechlorination of PCE to cis-DCE is faster and thermodynamically more favorable than dechlorination of cis-DCE to VC. The transformation of VC to ethylene is the slowest step of the process and hence limits the overall rate of the reaction. The rate of reductive dechlorination is also directly correlated with the number of chlorine atoms, and as such, it decreases with a decreasing number of chlorine atoms. In addition, while several groups of bacteria such as Desulfomonile, Dehalobacter, Desulfuromonas...etc. can perform the dehalogenation of PCE to TCE, only the Dehalococcoides group can perform the complete reductive dechlorination from PCE to ethene.

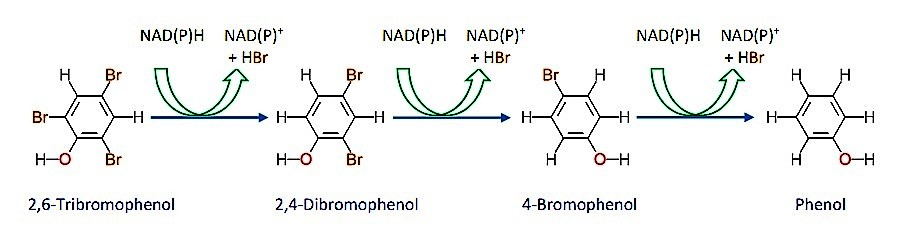
Figure 2: 2,4,6-TBP degradation by Ochrobactrum sp. based on the work of Yamada et al., 2008.

In addition to dechlorination of CAHs, microbes have also been reported to act on chlorinated aromatic hydrocarbons. An example of a reaction where aromatic AOX content has been reduced is demonstrated in figure 2 above. While little is known about the dehalogenation mechanisms of polyhalogenated phenols (PHPs) and polyhalogenated benzenes (PHBs), regioselectivity for halide location on the aromatic ring was observed. This regioselectivity is however dominated by both redox potentials for the reaction and the microbe's familiarity to the reaction. Moreover, due to the specificity of most microbes along with complex aromatic structures, in order to achieve a complete dehalogenation, a mixture of more than one species of bacteria and/or fungi (often known as a consortium) is utilized. The reaction in figure 2 shows the reductive debromination of 2,4,6-tribromophenol (2,4,6-TBP) by Ochrabactrum. Based on the relative degradation of the molecule along with analytical results, it has been postulated that degradation of 2,4,6-TBP proceeds through debromination of ortho-bromine in the first step by a dehalogenase to yield 2,4-dibromophenol (2,4-DBP). Since there are two ortho bromines, debromination of either ortho carbons would yield the same product . Other species such as Pseudomonas galthei or Azotobacter sp. showed preference for para-halide over the meta- or ortho -halides. For example, the Azotobacter sp. degrades 2,4,6-trichlorophenol (2,4,6-TCP) into 2,6-dichlorohydroquinone due to TCP-4-monooxygenase selectivity differences between ortho- and para-halide. These differences in regioselectivity between the species can be attributed to the specificity of the 3-dimensional enzyme structure and its hindrance from steric interactions. It has been postulated that a proton lost by the phenol group of 2,4,6-TBP resulting in the formation of a negatively charged halo-phenolate ion. Subsequent attack of the para-carbon with a hydride anion from NAD(P)H in a nucleophilic attack manner and resonance rearrangement results in substitution of bromine with hydride and formation of 2,4-DBP. Subsequent steps in a similar pattern yield 2-bromophenol, and phenol in the final step. Phenol can be metabolized by microorganisms to make methane and carbon dioxide or can be extracted easier than AOXs.

== Related terms ==
Organic halides, extractable organic halides (EOX), and total organic halides (TOX) are related content for this topic. EOX provides information on how halides can be extracted using a solvent while TOX provides information about the total organic halide content in the sample. This value can be used to estimate biochemical oxygen demand (BOD) or chemical oxygen demand (COD), a key factor in estimating the required oxygen to burn the organic compounds to estimate the percentage of AOX’s and Extractable organic halides.
