= Bleaching of wood pulp =

Chemical process in paper making

Bleaching of wood pulp is the chemical processing of wood pulp to lighten its color and whiten the pulp. The primary product of wood pulp is paper, for which whiteness (similar to, but distinct from brightness) is an important characteristic. These processes and chemistry are also applicable to the bleaching of non-wood pulps, such as those made from bamboo or kenaf.

== Paper brightness ==
Brightness is the amount of incident light reflected from paper under specified conditions, usually reported as the percentage of light reflected, so a higher number means a brighter or whiter paper. In the US, the TAPPI T 452 or T 525 standards are used. The international community uses ISO standards.

Comparison of the US and ISO systems rating high-brightness papers
TAPPI brightness	ISO brightness
84	88
92	104
96	108
97	≥109

The table shows how the two systems rate high-brightness papers, but there is no simple way to convert between the two systems because the test methods are so different. The ISO rating is higher and can be over 100. This is because contemporary white paper incorporates fluorescent whitening agents (FWA). Because the ISO standard only measures a narrow range of blue light, it is not directly comparable to human vision of whiteness or brightness.

Newsprint ranges from 55 to 75 ISO brightness. Writing and printer paper would typically be as bright as 104 ISO.

While the results are the same, the processes and fundamental chemistry involved in bleaching chemical pulps (like kraft or sulfite) are very different from those involved in bleaching mechanical pulps (like stoneground, thermomechanical or chemo-thermomechanical). Chemical pulps contain very little lignin, while mechanical pulps contain most of the lignin that was present in the wood used to make the pulp. Lignin is the main source of color in pulp due to the presence of a variety of chromophores naturally present in the wood or created in the pulp mill.

== Bleaching mechanical pulps ==
Mechanical pulp retains most of the lignin present in the wood used to make the pulp and thus contain almost as much lignin as they do cellulose and hemicellulose. It would be impractical to remove this much lignin by bleaching, and undesirable since one of the big advantages of mechanical pulp is the high yield of pulp based on wood used. Therefore, the objective of bleaching mechanical pulp (also referred to as brightening) is to remove only the chromophores (color-causing groups). This is possible because the structures responsible for color are also more susceptible to oxidation or reduction.

Alkaline hydrogen peroxide is the most commonly used bleaching agent for mechanical pulp. The amount of base such as sodium hydroxide is less than that used in bleaching chemical pulps and the temperatures are lower. These conditions allow alkaline peroxide to selectively oxidize non-aromatic conjugated groups responsible for absorbing visible light. The decomposition of hydrogen peroxide is catalyzed by transition metals, and iron, manganese and copper are of particular importance in pulp bleaching. The use of chelating agents like EDTA to remove some of these metal ions from the pulp prior to adding peroxide allows the peroxide to be used more efficiently. Magnesium salts and sodium silicate are also added to improve bleaching with alkaline peroxide.

Sodium dithionite (Na_{2}S_{2}O_{4}), also known as sodium hydrosulfite, is the other main reagent used to brighten mechanical pulps. In contrast to hydrogen peroxide, which oxidizes the chromophores, dithionite reduces these color-causing groups. Dithionite reacts with oxygen, so efficient use of dithionite requires that oxygen exposure be minimized during its use.

Chelating agents can contribute to brightness gain by sequestering iron ions, for example, as EDTA complexes, which are less colored than the complexes formed between iron and lignin.

The brightness gains achieved in bleaching mechanical pulps are temporary, since almost all of the lignin present in the wood is still present in the pulp. Exposure to air and light can produce new chromophores from this residual lignin. This is why newspaper yellows as it ages. Yellowing also occurs due to the acidic sizing.

== Bleaching of recycled pulp ==
Hydrogen peroxide and sodium dithionite are used to increase the brightness of deinked pulp. The bleaching methods are similar for mechanical pulp, in which the goal is to make the fibers brighter.

== Bleaching chemical pulps ==
Chemical pulps, such as those from the kraft process or sulfite pulping, contain much less lignin than mechanical pulps, (<5% compared to approximately 40%). The goal in bleaching chemical pulps is to remove essentially all of the residual lignin, hence the process is often referred to as delignification. Sodium hypochlorite (household bleach) was initially used to bleach chemical pulps, but was largely replaced in the 1930s by chlorine. Concerns about the release of organochlorine compounds into the environment prompted the development of elemental chlorine free (ECF) and totally chlorine free (TCF) bleaching processes.

Delignification of chemical pulps is frequently composed of four or more discrete steps, with each step designated by a letter:

Delignification steps of chemical pulps
Chemical or process used	Letter designation
Chlorine	C
Sodium hypochlorite	H
Chlorine dioxide	D
Extraction with sodium hydroxide	E
Oxygen	O
Alkaline hydrogen peroxide	P
Ozone	Z
Chelation to remove metals	Q
Enzymes (especially xylanase)	X
Peracids (peroxy acids)	Paa
Sodium dithionite (sodium hydrosulfite)	Y

A bleaching sequence from the 1950s could look like CEHEH – the pulp would have been exposed to chlorine, extracted (washed) with a sodium hydroxide solution to remove lignin fragmented by the chlorination, treated with sodium hypochlorite, washed with sodium hydroxide again and given a final treatment with hypochlorite. An example of a modern totally chlorine-free (TCF) sequence is OZEPY, where the pulp would be treated with oxygen, then ozone, washed with sodium hydroxide, then treated in sequence with alkaline peroxide and sodium dithionite.

=== Chlorine and hypochlorite ===
Chlorine replaces hydrogen on the aromatic rings of lignin via aromatic substitution, oxidizes pendant groups to carboxylic acids and adds across carbon carbon double bonds in the lignin sidechains. Chlorine also attacks cellulose, but this reaction occurs predominantly at pH = 7, where un-ionized hypochlorous acid, HClO, is the main chlorine species in solution. To avoid excessive cellulose degradation, chlorination is carried out at pH < 1.5.

Cl_{2} + H_{2}O ⇌ H^{+} + Cl^{−} + HClO

At pH > 8 the dominant species is hypochlorite, ClO^{−}, which is also useful for lignin removal. Sodium hypochlorite can be purchased or generated in situ by reacting chlorine with sodium hydroxide:

2 NaOH + Cl_{2} ⇌ NaOCl + NaCl + H_{2}O

The main objection to the use of chlorine for bleaching pulp is the large amounts of soluble organochlorine compounds produced and released into the environment.

=== Chlorine dioxide ===
Chlorine dioxide, ClO_{2} is an unstable gas with moderate solubility in water. It is usually generated in an aqueous solution and used immediately because it decomposes and is explosive in higher concentrations. It is produced by reacting sodium chlorate with a reducing agent like sulfur dioxide:

2 NaClO_{3} + H_{2}SO_{4} + SO_{2} → 2 ClO_{2} + 2 NaHSO_{4}

Chlorine dioxide is sometimes used in combination with chlorine, but it is used alone in ECF (elemental-chlorine-free) bleaching sequences. It is used at moderately acidic pH (3.5 to 6). The use of chlorine dioxide minimizes the amount of organochlorine compounds produced. Chlorine dioxide (ECF technology) currently is the most important bleaching method worldwide. About 95% of all bleached kraft pulp is made using chlorine dioxide in ECF bleaching sequences.

=== Extraction or washing ===
All bleaching agents used to delignify chemical pulp, with the exception of sodium dithionite, break lignin down into smaller, oxygen-containing molecules. These breakdown products are generally soluble in water, especially if the pH is greater than 7 (many of the products are carboxylic acids). These materials must be removed between bleaching stages to avoid excessive use of bleaching chemicals, since many of these smaller molecules are still susceptible to oxidation. The need to minimize water use in modern pulp mills has driven the development of equipment and techniques for the efficient use of available water.

=== Oxygen ===
Oxygen exists as a ground-state triplet, which is relatively unreactive and needs free radicals or very electron-rich substrates such as deprotonated lignin phenolic groups. The production of these phenoxide groups requires that delignification with oxygen be carried out under very basic conditions (pH > 12). The reactions involved are primarily single-electron (radical) reactions. Oxygen opens rings and cleaves sidechains, giving a complex mixture of small oxygenated molecules. Transition-metal compounds, particularly those of iron, manganese and copper, which have multiple oxidation states, facilitate many radical reactions and impact oxygen delignification. While the radical reactions are largely responsible for delignification, they are detrimental to cellulose. Oxygen-based radicals, especially hydroxyl radicals, HO•, can oxidize hydroxyl groups in the cellulose chains to ketones, and under the strongly basic conditions used in oxygen delignification, these compounds undergo reverse aldol reactions, leading to cleavage of cellulose chains. Magnesium salts are added to oxygen delignification to help preserve the cellulose chains, but mechanism of this protection has not been confirmed.

=== Hydrogen peroxide ===
Using hydrogen peroxide to delignify chemical pulp requires more vigorous conditions than for brightening mechanical pulp. Both pH and temperature are higher when treating chemical pulp. The chemistry is very similar to that involved in oxygen delignification, in terms of the radical species involved and the products produced. Hydrogen peroxide is sometimes used with oxygen in the same bleaching stage, and this give the letter designation Op in bleaching sequences. Redox-active metal ions, particularly manganese, Mn(II/IV), catalyze the decomposition of hydrogen peroxide, so some improvement in the efficiency of peroxide bleaching can be achieved if the metal levels are controlled.

=== Ozone ===
Ozone is a very powerful oxidizing agent, and the biggest challenge in using it to bleach wood pulp is to get sufficient selectivity so that the desirable cellulose is not degraded. Ozone reacts with the carbon–carbon double bonds in lignin, including those within aromatic rings. In the 1990s ozone was touted as good reagent to allow pulp to be bleached without any chlorine-containing chemicals (totally chlorine-free, TCF). The emphasis has changed, and ozone is seen as an adjunct to chlorine dioxide in bleaching sequences not using any elemental chlorine (elemental-chlorine-free, ECF). Over 25 pulp mills worldwide have installed equipment to generate and use ozone.

=== Chelant wash ===
The effect of transition metals such as Mn on some of the bleaching stages has already been mentioned. Sometimes it is beneficial to remove some of these redox-active metal ions from the pulp by washing the pulp with a chelating agent such as EDTA or DTPA. This is more common in TCF bleaching sequences for two reasons: the acidic chlorine or chlorine dioxide stages tend to remove metal ions (metal ions usually being more soluble at lower pH), and TCF stages rely more heavily on oxygen-based bleaching agents, which are more susceptible to the detrimental effects of these metal ions. Chelant washes are usually carried out at or near pH = 7. Lower-pH solutions are more effective at removing redox-active transition metals (Mn, Fe, Cu), but also remove most of the beneficial metal ions, especially magnesium. A negative impact of chelating agents, as DTPA, is their toxicity for the activated sludges in the treatment of kraft pulping effluent.

=== Other bleaching agents ===
A variety of less common bleaching agents have been used on chemical pulps. They include peroxyacetic acid, peroxyformic acid, potassium peroxymonosulfate (oxone), dimethyldioxirane, which is generated in situ from acetone and potassium peroxymonosulfate, and peroxymonophosphoric acid.

Enzymes like xylanase have been used in pulp bleaching to increase the efficiency of other bleaching chemicals. It is believed that xylanase does this by cleaving lignin–xylan bonds to make lignin more accessible to other reagents. It is possible that other enzymes such as those used by fungi to degrade lignin may be useful in pulp bleaching.

== Environmental considerations ==
The bleaching of chemical pulps has the potential to cause significant environmental damage, primarily through the release of organic materials into waterways. Pulp mills are almost always located near large bodies of water because they require substantial quantities of water for their processes. An increased public awareness of environmental issues from the 1970s and 1980s, as evidenced by the formation of organizations like Greenpeace, influenced the pulping industry and governments to address the release of these materials into the environment.

Worldwide pulp production by type of bleaching used: chlorine (Cl_{2}), elemental chlorine free (ECF) and total chlorine free (TCF)

Conventional bleaching using elemental chlorine produces and releases into the environment large amounts of chlorinated organic compounds, including chlorinated dioxins. Dioxins are recognized as a persistent environmental pollutant, regulated internationally by the Stockholm Convention on Persistent Organic Pollutants.

Dioxins are highly toxic, and health effects on humans include reproductive, developmental, immune and hormonal problems. They are known to be carcinogenic. Over 90% of human exposure is through food, primarily meat, dairy, fish and shellfish, as dioxins accumulate in the food chain in the fatty tissue of animals.

As a result, from the 1990s onwards, the use of elemental chlorine in the delignification process was substantially reduced and replaced with ECF (elemental chlorine free) and TCF (totally chlorine free) bleaching processes. In 2005, elemental chlorine was used in 19–20% of kraft pulp production globally, down from over 90% in 1990. 75% of kraft pulp used ECF, with the remaining 5–6% using TCF. Most TCF pulp is produced in Sweden and Finland for sale in Germany, all markets with a high level of environmental awareness. In 1999, TCF pulp represented 25% of the European market.

TCF bleaching, by removing chlorine from the process, reduces chlorinated organic compounds to background levels in pulp-mill effluent. ECF bleaching can substantially reduce but not eliminate chlorinated organic compounds, including dioxins, from effluent. While modern ECF plants can achieve chlorinated organic compounds (AOX) emissions of less than 0.05 kg per tonne of pulp produced, most do not achieve this level of emissions. Within the EU, the average chlorinated organic compound emissions for ECF plants is 0.15 kg per tonne.

However, there has been disagreement about the comparative environmental effects of ECF and TCF bleaching. Some researchers found that there is no environmental difference between ECF and TCF, while others concluded that among ECF and TCF effluents before and after secondary treatment, TCF effluents are the least toxic.

== See also ==
- Johan Richter – inventor of the continuous process for bleaching wood pulp
- Paper chemicals
