= Xylanase =

Any of a class of enzymes that degrade the polysaccharide xylan into xylose

Endo-1,4-β-xylanase

Identifiers
- EC no.: 3.2.1.8
- CAS no.: 9025-57-4

Databases
- BRENDA: enzyme data
- ExPASy: NiceZyme view
- KEGG: enzyme entry
- MetaCyc: metabolic pathway
- Rhea: reactions
- PDB structures: RCSB PDB PDBe PDBsum
- Gene Ontology: AmiGO / QuickGO
Search
- PMC: articles
- PubMed: articles
- NCBI: proteins

Endo-1,4-β-xylanase (EC 3.2.1.8, systematic name 4-β-D-xylan xylanohydrolase) is any of a class of enzymes that degrade the linear polysaccharide xylan into xylose, thus breaking down hemicellulose, one of the major components of plant cell walls:

Endohydrolysis of (1→4)-β-D-xylosidic linkages in xylans

Xylanase plays a major role in micro-organisms thriving on plant sources for the degradation of plant matter into usable nutrients. Xylanases are produced by fungi, bacteria, yeast, marine algae, protozoans, snails, crustaceans, insect, seeds, etc.; mammals do not produce xylanases. However, the principal commercial source of xylanases is filamentous fungi.

Commercial applications for xylanase include the chlorine-free bleaching of wood pulp prior to the papermaking process, and the increased digestibility of silage (in this aspect, it is also used for fermentative composting).

Apart from its use in the pulp and paper industry, xylanases are also used as food additives to poultry; in wheat flour for improving dough handling and quality of baked products; for the extraction of coffee, plant oils, and starch; in the improvement of nutritional properties of agricultural silage and grain feed; and in combination with pectinase and cellulase for clarification of fruit juices and degumming of plant fiber sources such as flax, hemp, jute, and ramie. A good quantity of scientific literature is available on key features of xylanase enzymes in biotechnology ranging from their screening in microbial sources to production methods, characterization, purification and applications in commercial sector. High resilience to heating is required for some applications of xylanase, which can be achieved through selection of suitable microbial enzymes or by cyclization of the termini by SpyTag/SpyCatcher reaction.

Additionally, xylanase is the key ingredient in the dough conditioners s500 and us500 manufactured by Puratos. These enzymes are used to improve the dough's workability and absorption of water.

In the future, xylanase may be used for the production of biofuel from unusable plant material.

== Synonyms ==
Endo-(1→4)-β-xylan 4-xylanohydrolase, endo-1,4-xylanase, endo-1,4-β-xylanase, β-1,4-xylanase, endo-1,4-β-D-xylanase, 1,4-β-xylan xylanohydrolase, β-xylanase, β-1,4-xylan xylanohydrolase, β-D-xylanase
